= Basilica of the Sacred Heart of Jesus, Bogotá =

Minor basilica in Bogotá, Colombia

Basilica of the Sacred Heart of Jesus
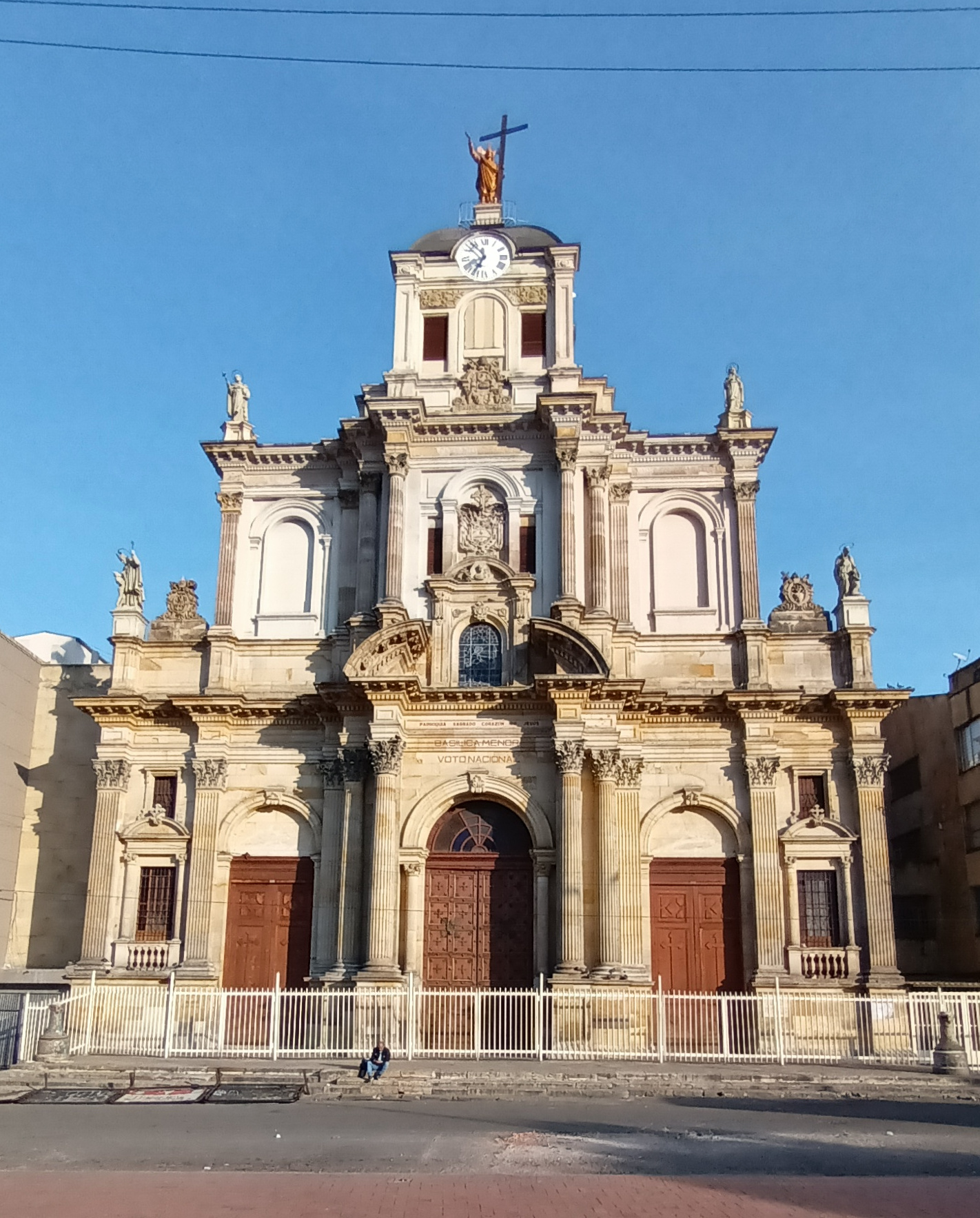
- Overview of the main façade

Religion
- Affiliation: Roman Catholic
- Ecclesiastical or organizational status: Basilica, Parish
- Year consecrated: 24 September 1916
- Status: Active

Location
- Location: Plaza de Los Mártires, Bogotá
- Country: Colombia
- Interactive map of Basilica of the Sacred Heart of Jesus
- Coordinates: 4°36′9″N 74°4′57″W

Architecture
- Architects: Francisco Olaya (initial chapel); Julián Lombana Herrera (reworking); Antonio María Pueyo de Val (conceptual redesign); Antonio Stoute (transept and dome)
- Type: Church
- Style: Neo-baroque
- Groundbreaking: 22 June 1902 (124 years ago) (laying of the first stone)
- Completed: 24 September 1916 (109 years ago) (inauguration); 21 August 1938 (87 years ago) (transept and dome inauguration)

Specifications
- Direction of façade: East
- Length: 68.4 m (224 ft)
- Width: 20 m (66 ft) (nave); 27.4 m (90 ft) (façade); 30 m (98 ft) (transept)
- Height (max): 53.8 m (177 ft) (to custodia on dome)
- Materials: Stone, brick, wood, metal frame (dome)
- UNESCO World Heritage Site

The minor Basilica of the Sacred Heart of Jesus (Spanish: Basílica del Sagrado Corazón de Jesús), commonly known as the Basilica of the Voto Nacional, is an important Colombian Roman Catholic church dedicated to Jesus Christ under the title of the Sacred Heart of Jesus. It is the seat of the parish of the same name and belongs to the Archdiocese of Bogotá. The basilica is located in the Voto Nacional neighborhood, on the western side of Plaza de Los Mártires, in the Los Mártires locality of Bogotá.

The church was built by the Claretian community, which has administered it since its foundation. The project involved several architects, including Francisco Olaya, Julián Lombana Herrera, and the Dutch architect Antonio Stoute, who designed the transept and dome. (Note: Antonio Stoute, was a Dutch architect who practiced his profession in Colombia from before 1912 and possibly until 1939, he was renowned for his knowledge of religious architecture. He was hired on several occasions by religious communities in Bogotá and other cities mainly to build churches. For the Claretians he also made the plans for the construction of the El Cerro de Zipaquirá School, around 1930. Among his most outstanding works are the Cathedral of Nuestra Señora de los Remedios, in Riohacha, for which he was called by the Capuchin Order, where he reformed the façade, giving it a more artistic and marked style, preventing it from collapsing, in addition to composing the walls, placing the four marble altars and a dome was erected over the main altar. In the San Roque Church in Barranquilla he drew up "new plans" in Gothic style, as the previous building collapsed after an unfortunate construction attempt in 1917. Also on the Colombian Caribbean Coast in 1916 he made the San Juan de Dios Hospital in Santa Marta, which consists of "two neoclassical style pavilions adjacent to the current chapel". In association with the architect Constantino de Castro, he adjusted the designs of the Divino Salvador de Ubaté Minor Basilica, in French neo-Gothic style. Today it is classified as a National Property of Cultural Interest. He also built the obelisk in homage to the Liberator in Cajicá square, inaugurated in 1930. In Bogotá he built the Cristo Rey chapel in 1927, commissioned by the Sisters of the Visitation. The temple was consecrated in 1934 and is classified as a Property of Cultural Interest of Bogotá. Furthermore, he was responsible for the repair work on the dome of the Tunja Cathedral after damage caused by the 1928 earthquake. The works took place between June 1929 and March 1931.: Reina Mendoza, Sandra (2016). Paz y el Sagrado Corazón: Iglesia del Voto Nacional [Peace and the Sacred Heart: Church of the National Vow] (in Spanish). Bogotá: Instituto Distrital de Patrimonio Cultural. pp. 122–123.)

The painter Ricardo Acevedo Bernal created the ceiling paintings and designed the stained glass windows and main retablo, while the Italian sculptor Pedro Julio D'Achiard worked on the façade ornamentation.

Construction began in 1881 as a private initiative promoted by devotees of the Sacred Heart of Jesus, led by Rosa Calvo, who donated much of the land. Following the Thousand Days' War, Archbishop Bernardo Herrera Restrepo proposed dedicating the church to the Sacred Heart of Jesus as a national vow for peace in Colombia. The government accepted the proposal, and the cornerstone was laid on 22 June 1902. The church subsequently became the site of the consecration of Colombia to the Sacred Heart of Jesus.

The basilica is built in the Neo-baroque style, with a longitudinal nave, 16 side chapels, and a transept. At the crossing rises a double dome system, including an exterior glass dome in the colors of the Colombian flag and an interior stained-glass dome depicting a radiant sun.

In 1964, Pope Paul VI granted the church the title of Minor Basilica. The building was later designated a Property of Cultural Interest of Bogotá in 2001 and a National Property of Cultural Interest by the Ministry of Culture of Colombia in 2012.

During the late 20th century, the surrounding Los Mártires area experienced economic and social decline, and the basilica fell into severe disrepair. Restoration work led by Bogotá's District Institute of Cultural Heritage has been carried out in phases, including the restoration of the façade, transept, presbytery, and dome. A final phase covering the nave and side chapels was delayed following the COVID-19 pandemic.

== History ==
=== Context ===
Following the independence movements of the early 19th century, Colombia experienced repeated civil conflicts. Between 1812 and 1886, the country underwent eight national civil wars, in addition to numerous regional uprisings. During the 1840s, the Liberal and Conservative parties emerged as the country's two dominant political factions.

Both parties sought control of the central government, deepening political polarization between Conservatives, known as “Blues,” and Liberals, known as “Reds.” Conservatives defended the principles of “God, fatherland, and family,” emphasizing Catholicism and traditional social values, while Liberals identified with the ideals of the French Revolution and promoted secularism, religious tolerance, and freedom of conscience.

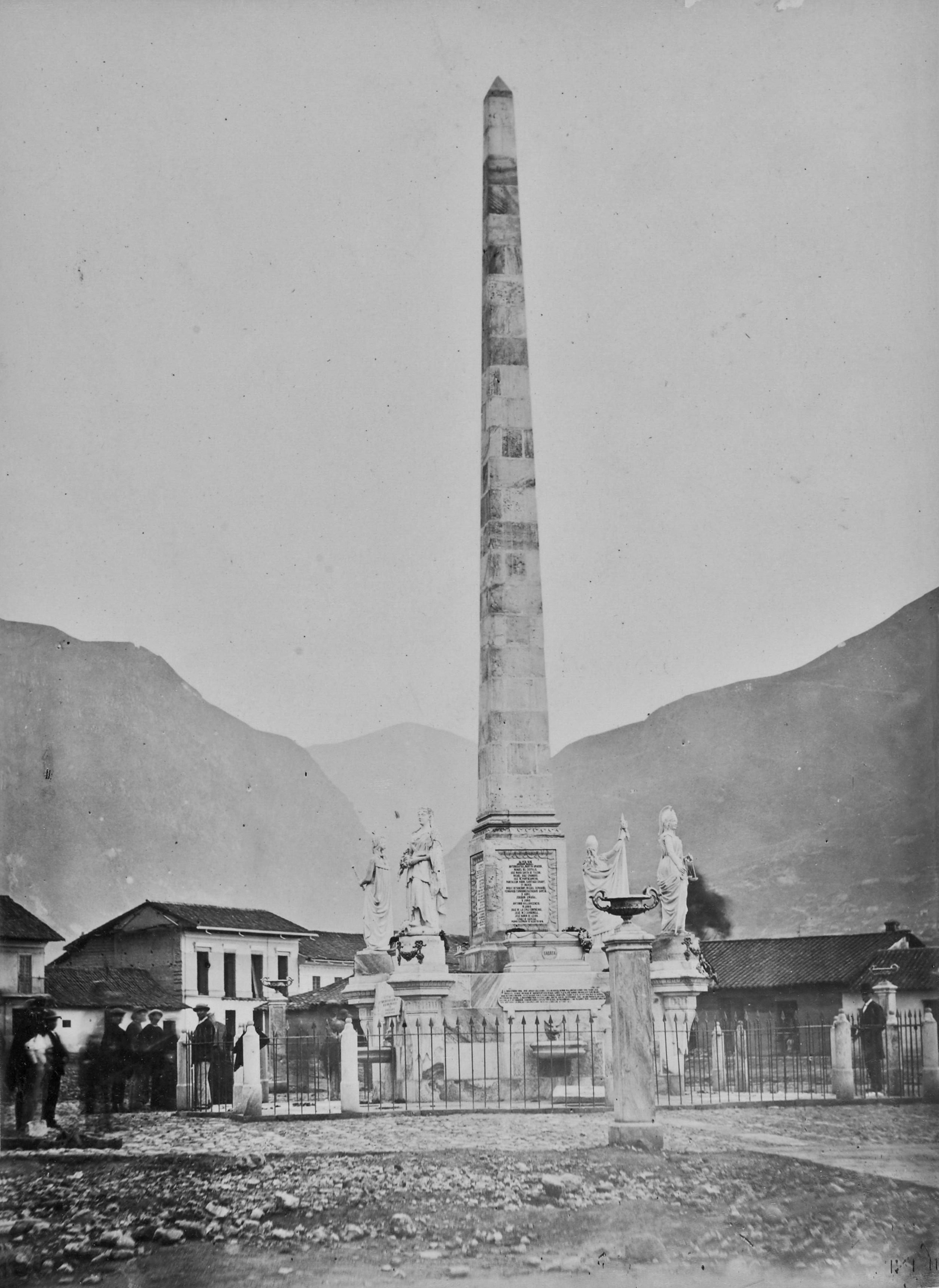
In 1893

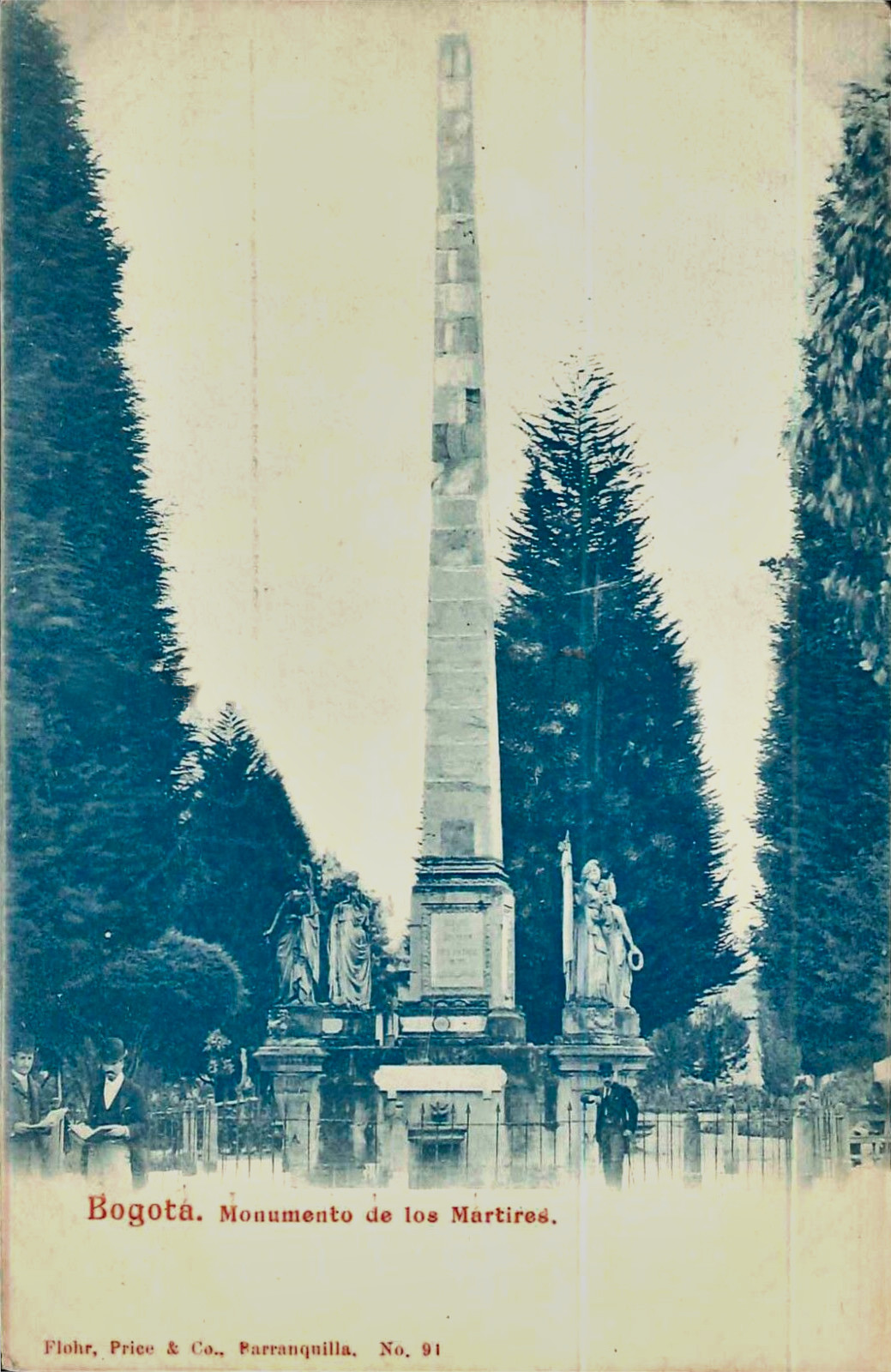
In 1904

Monument to the Martyrs in the square of the same name, on whose west side the Voto Nacional temple was built. Between the two photographs, ten years apart, it can be seen how it went from being a plot of land with nothing but the monument to having abundant vegetation.

Despite these divisions, the Catholic Church remained a unifying institution and an influential political force. The Liberal Party viewed this influence with suspicion. The Colombian Constitution of 1886 and the Concordat of 1887 attempted to redefine relations between Church and State, recognizing Catholicism as the religion professed by most Colombians and promoting education based on Christian principles. Political tensions nevertheless culminated in the Thousand Days' War (1899–1902), fought between the Liberal Party and the nationalist sector of the Conservative Party. At the same time, devotion to the Sacred Heart of Jesus spread throughout Colombia, largely through the Apostleship of Prayer and its monthly publication El Mensajero del Corazón de Jesús, both established in 1867.

The movement gained support from clergy and public figures, including Archbishop Vicente Arbeláez Gómez, who consecrated the Archdiocese of Bogotá to the Sacred Heart in 1874, and Bernardo Herrera Restrepo, later Archbishop of Bogotá, who directed the Apostleship of Prayer in the city.

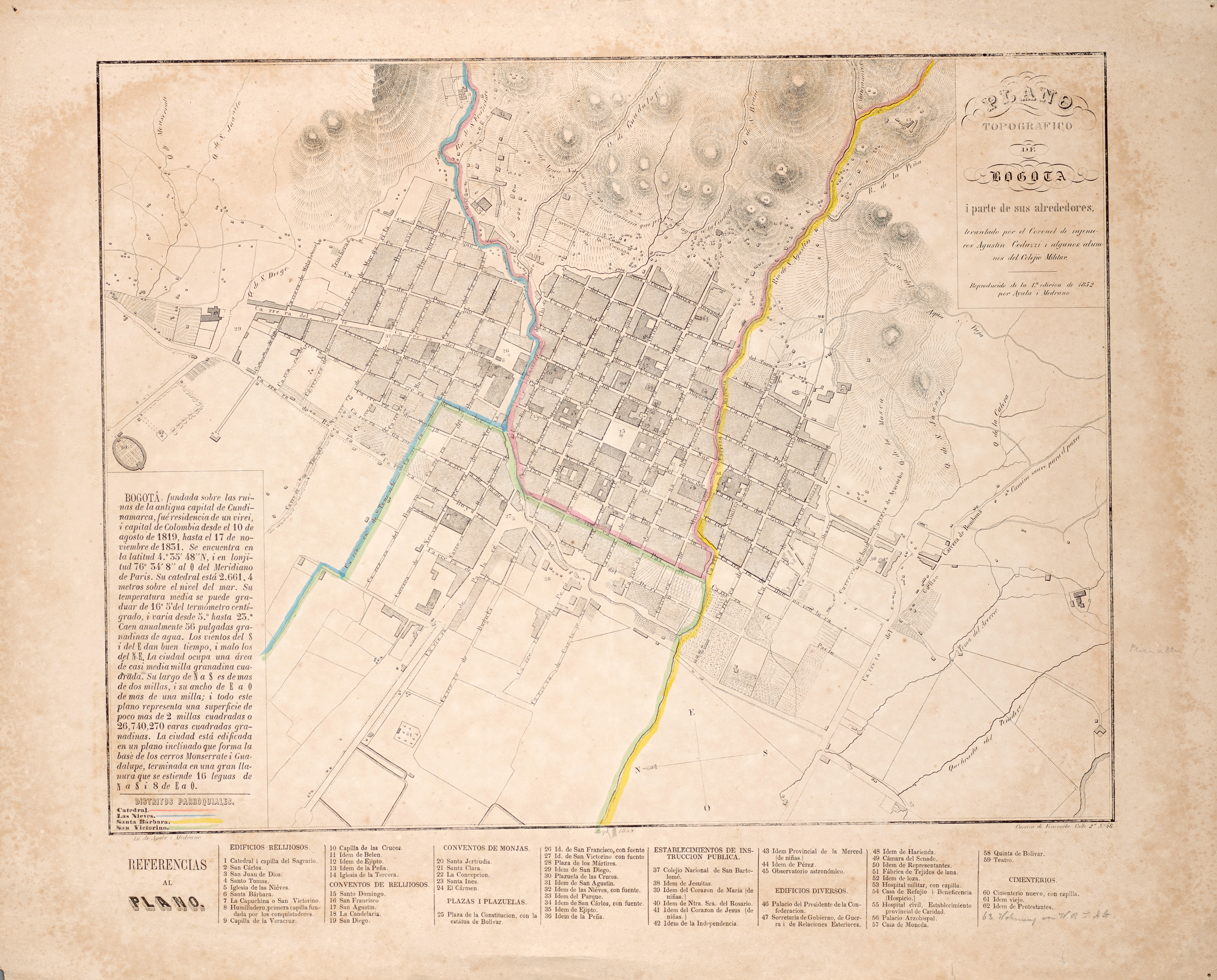
Map of Bogotá in 1852. Around the Plaza
de Los Mártires (red dot) there is little urban
development. In 1881, on the west side of that square,
construction began on the Chapel of the Sacred Heart
of Jesus. Plaza de Bolívar is located at the (blue dot).

By the end of 1891, numerous Colombian municipalities had been consecrated to the Sacred Heart of Jesus. In 1892, Bogotá was formally consecrated through a municipal agreement, and the ceremony took place at Bogotá Cathedral on 12 October of that year. These political consecrations were strongly criticized by Liberals.

The devotion also expanded internationally. In 1899, Pope Leo XIII, through the encyclical Annum Sacrum, consecrated the human race to the Sacred Heart of Jesus and ordered similar ceremonies to be held worldwide in 1900.

In 1902, amid the Thousand Days’ War, Archbishop Bernardo Herrera Restrepo proposed that the Colombian government dedicate the nation to the Sacred Heart of Jesus as a vow for peace and transform an unfinished chapel in Bogotá into the Church of the Voto Nacional. The proposal was accepted by the government, and the church became the site of national religious ceremonies associated with peace and the protection of the nation.

The basilica subsequently became the principal site for annual Te Deum ceremonies attended by the president of Colombia, reinforcing its national significance.

The table below indicates the governments that renewed the consecration of the country, between 1914 and 1957.
Period	President	Political party	Did they renew the consecration?
1914–1918	José Vicente Concha	Conservative	Yes
1918–1921	Marco Fidel Suárez	Conservative	Yes
1922–1926	Pedro Nel Ospina	Conservative	Yes
1926–1930	Miguel Abadía Méndez	Conservative	Yes*
1930–1934	Enrique Olaya Herrera	Liberal	No
1934–1938	Alfonso López Pumarejo	Liberal	No
1938–1942	Eduardo Santos Montejo	Liberal	No
1942–1945	Alfonso López Pumarejo	Liberal	No
1945–1946	Alberto Lleras Camargo	Liberal	No
1946–1950	Mariano Ospina Pérez	Conservative	Yes
1950–1951	Laureano Gómez	Conservative	Yes
1951–1953	Roberto Urdaneta Arbeláez	Conservative	Yes
1953–1957	Gustavo Rojas Pinilla	Military (coup d'état)	Yes
* In the early years, the renewal of the Vow was done by one of the priests, sons of the President. In the last years of the Abadía Méndez administration, it was done by the President of the Republic himself.

Construction of the basilica took place in several phases between 1902 and 1938. The church was consecrated in 1916, when the façade and nave were completed, while the transept and dome were inaugurated in 1938. Architecturally, the building is considered an important example of Republican-era architecture in Colombia, reflecting the growing influence of European academic styles over earlier colonial forms.

=== 1881–1911. Doña Rosa's project ===
Construction of the chapel dedicated to the Sacred Heart of Jesus began in 1881 on the western side of Plaza de los Mártires, in Bogotá, on land donated by Rosa Calvo Cabrera, who also contributed 1,000 pesos to the project.

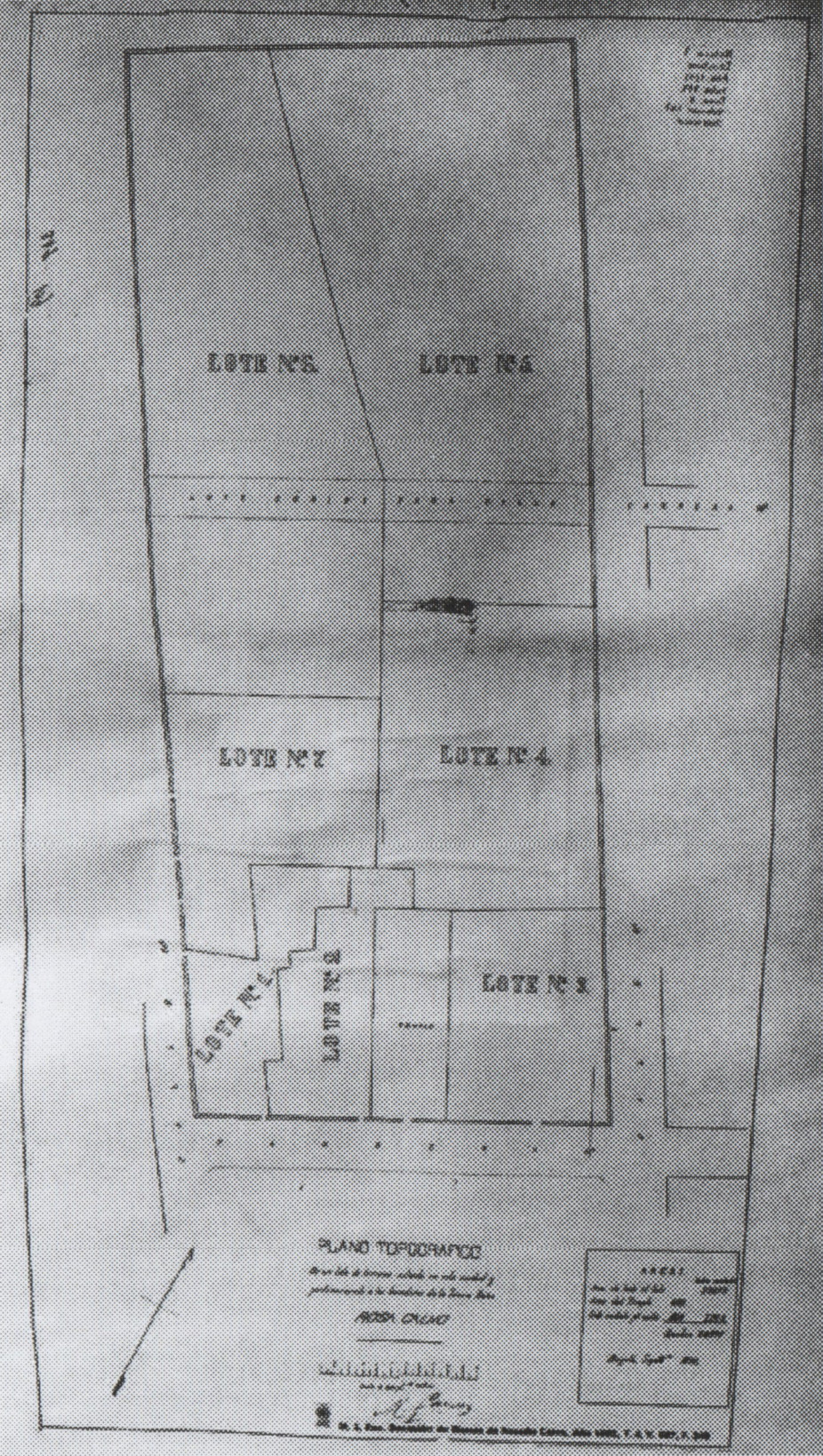
Plan of Doña Rosa Calvo's large property divided into eight lots, of which seven were inherited by her relatives and the one donated for the chapel, year 1892.

The works were overseen by Fr. Rudesindo Castillo, parish priest of La Capuchina Church, and financed through donations from the faithful. (Note: After the destruction of the San Victorino temple by an earthquake in 1827, the parish moved to the Iglesia de La Capuchina. Ibáñez, Pedro María (1952). Crónicas de Bogotá, volume II, chapter XXX, p. 65.) The original design was directed by architect Francisco Olaya, a disciple of Thomas Reed, until his death in 1888; he was later succeeded by architect Julián Lombana.

On 6 May 1898, the first chapel was opened. After Rosa Calvo's death in 1892, her estate was divided among her heirs, who transferred ownership of the chapel lot to the Archdiocese of Bogotá in 1901. Archbishop Bernardo Herrera Restrepo formally accepted the donation on behalf of the archdiocese, which subsequently assumed responsibility for the construction. (Note: Archbishop Bernardo Herrera Restrepo focused on the realization of the Voto Nacional temple, for which he already had experience. He had been the successor of Archbishop Vicente Arbeláez, who had protected him from a very young age and entrusted him with several very prominent positions, such as the direction of the Major Seminary of Bogotá for 14 years. He was bishop of Medellín between 1885 and 1891; in that city he resumed construction of the new cathedral, which had been suspended due to design flaws. Herrera requested an opinion from the architect Mariano Santamaría on those designs, who disqualified them and pointed out serious errors in the plans. He then turned to France, where he hired the architect Charles Carré for the new designs and direction of the works. Curiously, architect Carré, before coming to Colombia, was working as an inspector of the works of the Church of the Sacred Heart in Montmartre (Paris), known as the Church of the Voto Nacional in France.)

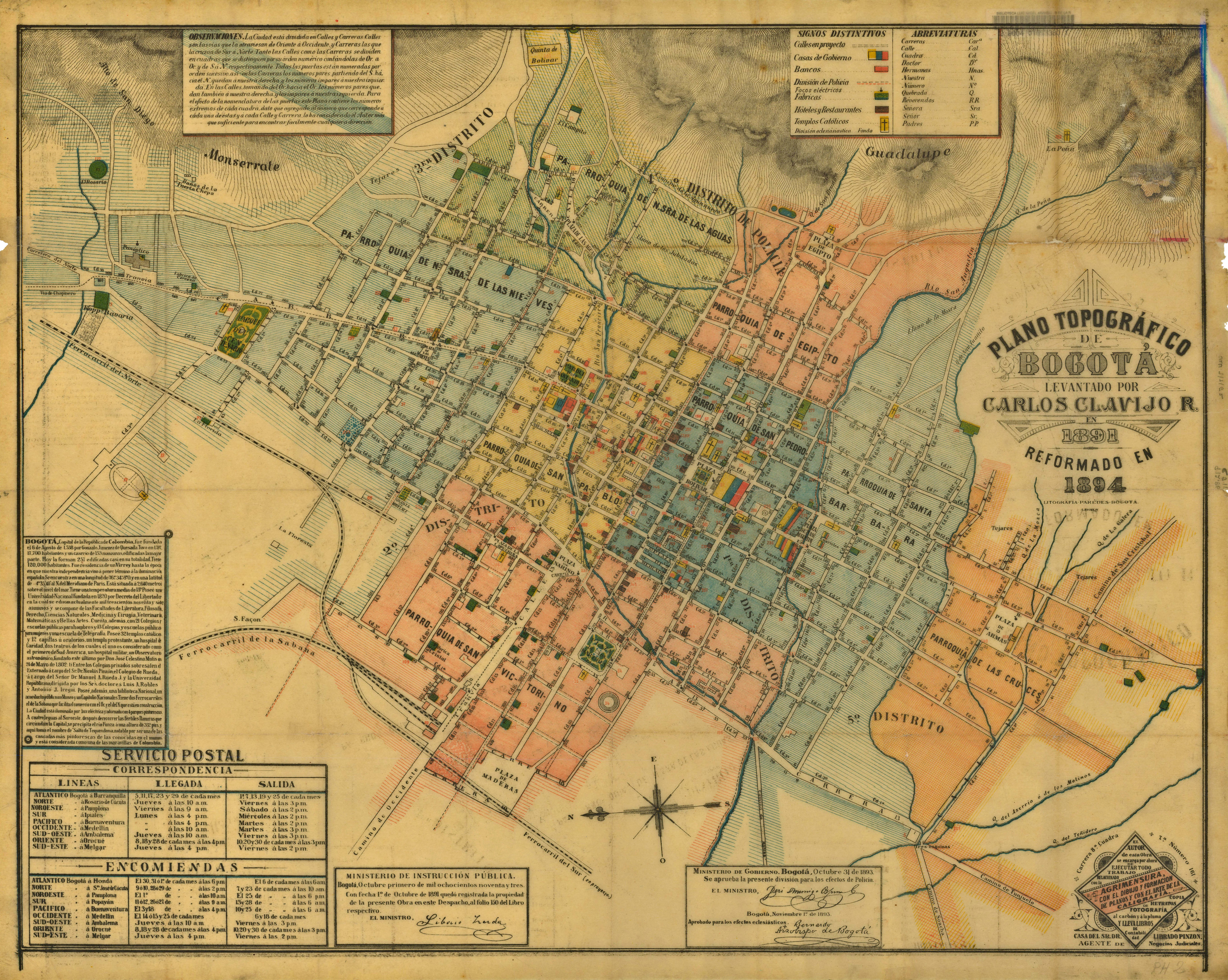
Map of Bogotá in 1894. It can be seen how around
the Plaza de Los Mártires (red dot) there is more
urban development and the site of the Chapel of
the Sacred Heart of Jesus is indicated. The location
of the Plaza de Bolívar (blue dot) and the Sabana
Train Station (yellow dot) built in 1887 can also be
seen.

Amid the devastation caused by the Thousand Days’ War, Archbishop Herrera proposed in a pastoral letter of 6 April 1902 that Colombia make a national vow to the Sacred Heart of Jesus for peace. The initiative was inspired in part by the Basilica of the Sacred Heart in Paris, built following a national vow in France after the Franco-Prussian War.

Conservative president José Manuel Marroquín endorsed the proposal through Decree 820 of 18 May 1902, by which the government agreed to support the construction of the church and organize public collections for the project. On 22 June 1902, a public ceremony was held beginning with a Mass at Bogotá Cathedral, followed by a procession to the unfinished church involving religious authorities, government officials, educational institutions, the police, and the army. (Note: Procession and its respective route, composition and order on June 22, 1902 At one o'clock in the afternoon the pilgrimage will take place to the temple being erected in the Plaza de Los Mártires in honor of the Sacred Heart of Jesus; it will go down 10th Street and return by 11th Street, in the following order: 1. The schools; 2. The Salesian community and its school; 3. The Christian Brothers and their school; 4. The Municipal Council, Mayor, Ombudsman, engineer and other Municipality employees; 5. A band; 6. The Society of Jesus and the Colegio de San Bartolomé, the national faculties of Medicine, Law and Mathematics; 7. El Colegio Mayor de Nuestra Señora del Rosario; 8. The Attorney General of the Nation and the Supreme Court of Justice; 9. The Council of State and the Court of Accounts; 10. A band; 11. The Governor of Cundinamarca and his secretaries. The Court and other judicial and administrative employees of the department; 12. The Conciliar Seminary; 13. A band; 14. The paso of the Sacred Heart of Jesus, led by army sappers; 15. Private individuals attending the pilgrimage; 16. The Most Illustrious Lord Archbishop, His Excellency the Delegate and the Venerable Metropolitan Chapter; 17. His Excellency the Vice President of the Republic and his Ministers; 18. The General Staff of the Army; 19. National employees and heads of the National Police; 20. The Army.; — Henríquez de Hernández, Cecilia (1989). «El Sagrado Corazón en la historia de Colombia».Revista de la Universidad Nacional (1944–1992) (no. 22): p. 84.) At Plaza de los Mártires, poet José María Rivas Groot delivered a speech describing the future church as a national sanctuary dedicated to peace and reconciliation.

During the ceremony, donations for the construction were collected, and Archbishop Herrera read the formula consecrating Colombia to the Sacred Heart of Jesus, which was repeated by Vice President José Manuel Marroquín and the attendees. The date is regarded as the symbolic laying of the first stone of the Voto Nacional church.

That same year, Archbishop Herrera established the Central Board of the Voto Nacional, composed of clergy and laymen responsible for overseeing the project. (Note: Although there was already a previous board, as indicated by the consultation that architect Lombana made to a Board in 1900. • Mesa Gómez, Carlos Eduardo (1984). El padre Pueyo Obispo de Pasto, 1917–1929 [Father Pueyo, Bishop of Pasto, 1917–1929] (in Spanish). Medellín: Editorial Zuluaga. p. 25.) In 1903, the Archdiocese of Bogotá acquired additional adjoining land to expand the church grounds and facilitate the development of the temple. (Note: Belisario Castro had inherited lot number 3 through the succession of assets of his wife Pía Rincón de Castro, who in turn acquired it through a purchase from the heirs of Rosa Calvo: Clara Calvo de Márquez, Ana Calvo de Vélez and Soledad Calvo. • Reina Mendoza, Sandra (2016). Paz y el Sagrado Corazón: Iglesia del Voto Nacional [Peace and the Sacred Heart: Church of the National Vow] (in Spanish). Bogotá: Instituto Distrital de Patrimonio Cultural. p. 61.)

=== 1911–1916. The Claretians arrive ===
The construction of the church entered a new phase when Archbishop Bernardo Herrera Restrepo entrusted the unfinished project to the Missionary Sons of the Immaculate Heart of Mary, known as the Claretians, who had arrived in Colombia in 1908. Herrera, who had met. Antonio María Claret during the First Vatican Council, held the congregation in high regard because of its missionary work in the country. In July 1911, he formally offered the Temple of the Voto Nacional to the Claretian prefect in Colombia, Fr. Juan Gil.

Fr. Gil informed the Superior General of the congregation, Fr. Martín Alsina, that the archbishop had offered the community one of Bogotá's principal churches, although the building remained unfinished. To oversee the project, the Claretians appointed the Spanish priest Antonio María Pueyo de Val, who combined experience in preaching and architecture. (Note: Fr. Juan Gil had coincided with Fr. Antonio Pueyo de Val in the Castile provincial chapter of 1901. • Mesa Gómez, Carlos Eduardo (1984). El padre Pueyo Obispo de Pasto, 1917–1929 [Father Pueyo, Bishop of Pasto, 1917–1929] (in Spanish). Medellín: Editorial Zuluaga. p. 22.)

Upon arriving in Bogotá in December 1912, Fr. Pueyo described the church as incomplete and in poor condition, with part of the structure still lacking roofing and the façade only partially built. Despite these limitations, regular Masses were already being celebrated there. Under his direction, the pace of construction accelerated considerably, and by December 1913 a monumental statue of the Sacred Heart of Jesus had been installed atop the façade.

The Claretians substantially modified the original architectural plans prepared by Julián Lombana. According to later Claretian accounts, Pueyo altered the façade, widened the interior spaces, increased the height of the vaults, and gave the church the appearance of a three-nave structures. The final façade design was produced by painter Ricardo Acevedo Bernal at Pueyo's request.

To raise support for the project, Pueyo delivered a lecture on sacred architecture in Bogotá in April 1913, attended by political, commercial, and social elites of the capital. The event contributed to the creation of a new board responsible for completing the church and generated regular financial contributions for the works.

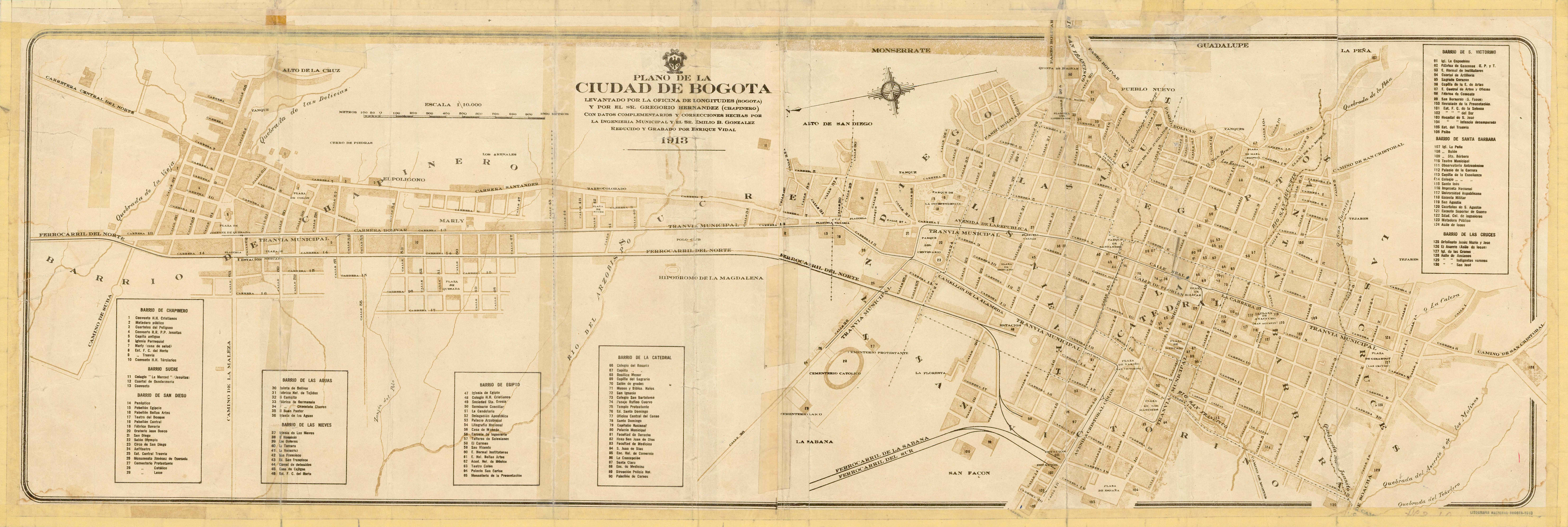
Map of Bogotá in 1913. The city is beginning to experience urban development
to the north. The map shows the location of the Plaza de Bolívar (blue dot), the
Plaza de Los Mártires (red dot), the Sabana Train Station (yellow dot) which
began construction on the new building that year, and the Our Lady of Lourdes
Church (green dot), one of the main works of the architect Julián Lombana. This
was the city that Fr. Pueyo de Val encountered.

In March 1913, Archbishop Herrera reorganized the Board of the Voto Nacional, incorporating clergy and prominent public figures, including José María González Valencia, Gerardo Arrubla, Rafael Carvajal, Manuel José Marroquín, and Fr. Pueyo. The board was tasked with organizing worship and national ceremonies dedicated to the Sacred Heart of Jesus. That same year, during the First National Eucharistic Congress of Colombia, Congress passed two laws related to the church. One formally rendered homage to Jesus Christ in the Eucharist, while the other allocated 10,000 pesos for the completion of the Temple of the Voto Nacional.

In December 1913, after delays caused by transportation problems and bad weather, the large statue of the Sacred Heart was finally blessed and installed on the façade. (Note: Actually the façade is not entirely made of stone. The first body of the façade is made up of a mixed technique of carved stone and courses of solid brick, which on the outside is covered with stone that acts as a large external cladding. The second and third bodies are made of solid brick with a stone-like finish. See section: Materials and structure.) Between 1914 and 1915, four statues representing American saints: Saint Turibius, Saint Louis Bertrand, Saint Peter Claver and Saint Rose of Lima were added to the exterior.

In 1916, the installation of the stained-glass windows in the side chapels was completed. Designed by Ricardo Acevedo Bernal and produced by the Spanish firm Casa Maumejean, the windows had begun to be installed the previous year.

The church was formally consecrated on 24 September 1916, coinciding with the episcopal silver jubilee of Archbishop Herrera Restrepo and a gathering of Colombian bishops in Bogotá. The ceremony included a Mass officiated by Enrico Gasparri and the renewal of Colombia's consecration to the Sacred Heart of Jesus. Although consecrated, the church remained unfinished, with several decorative and structural elements still incomplete. After the religious ceremony, Fr. Pueyo de Val gave a banquet.

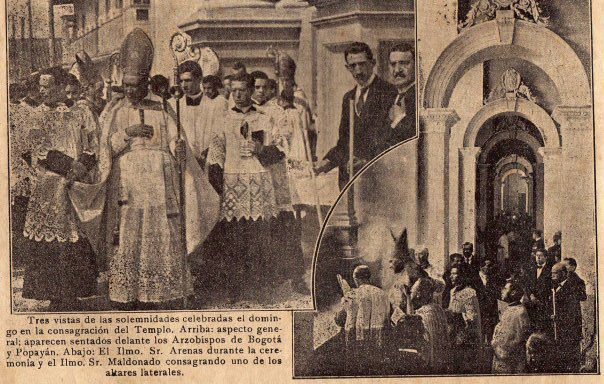
A) Left. Antonio Arenas, bishop of Socorro, during the ceremony. Right. Eduardo Maldonado, bishop of Tunja consecrating one of the side altars.

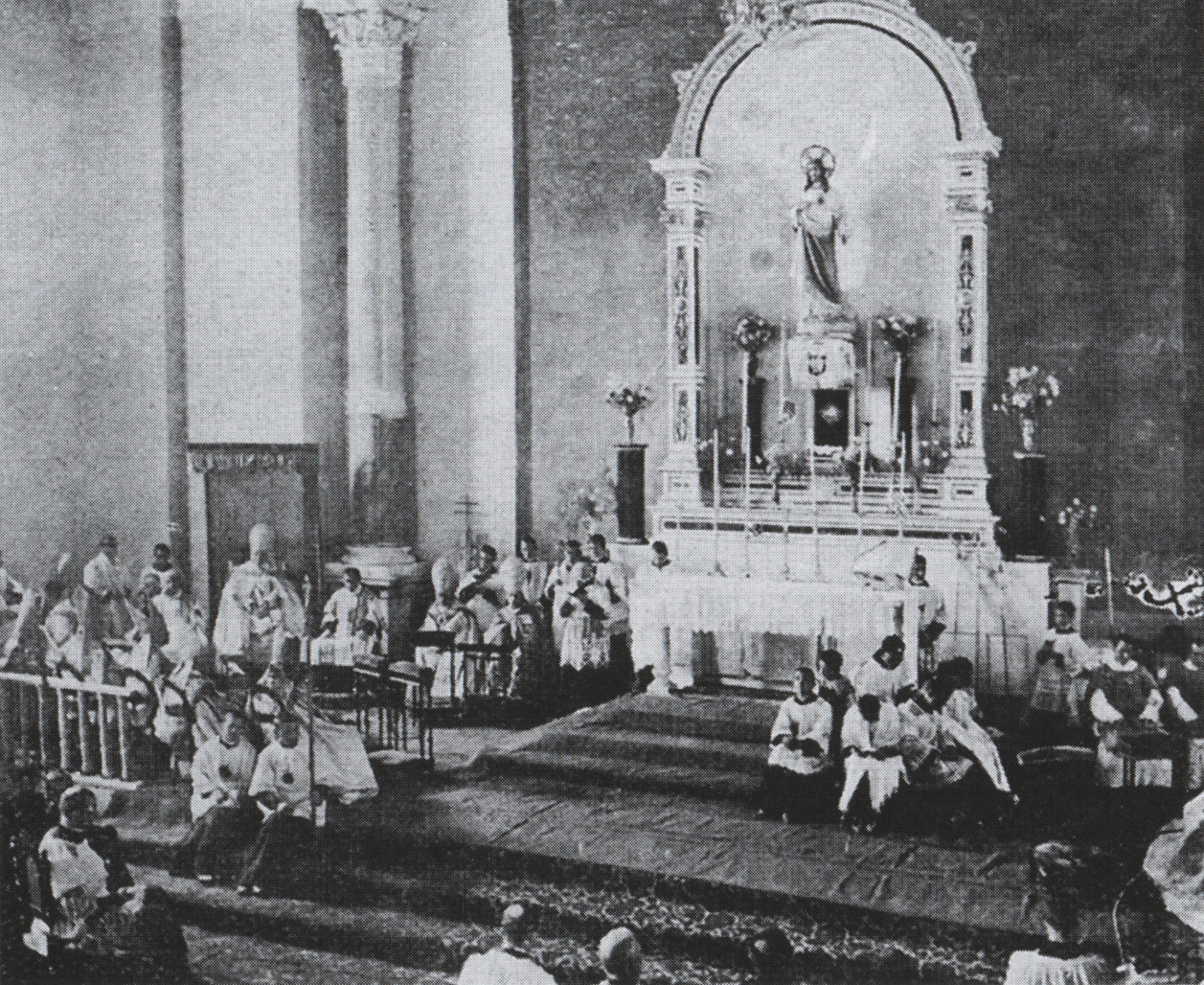
B) Consecration Mass. The first altar and main altarpiece are seen, along with the first image of the Sacred Heart of Jesus.

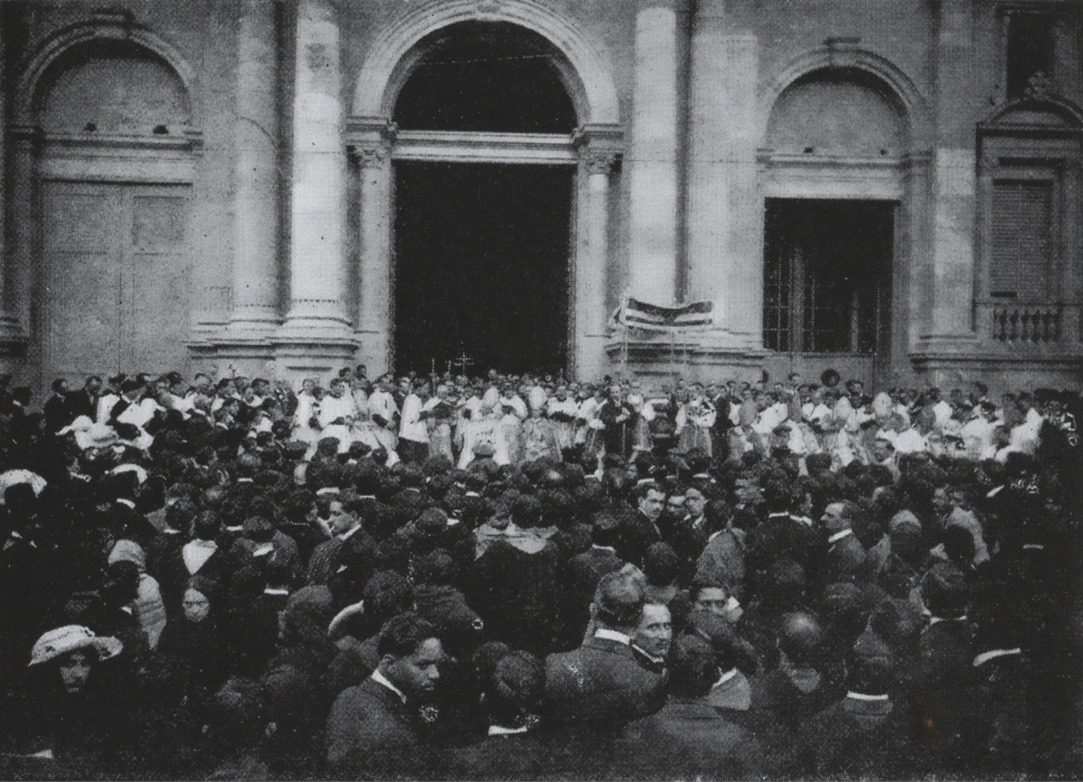
C) Crowded attendance at the ceremony.

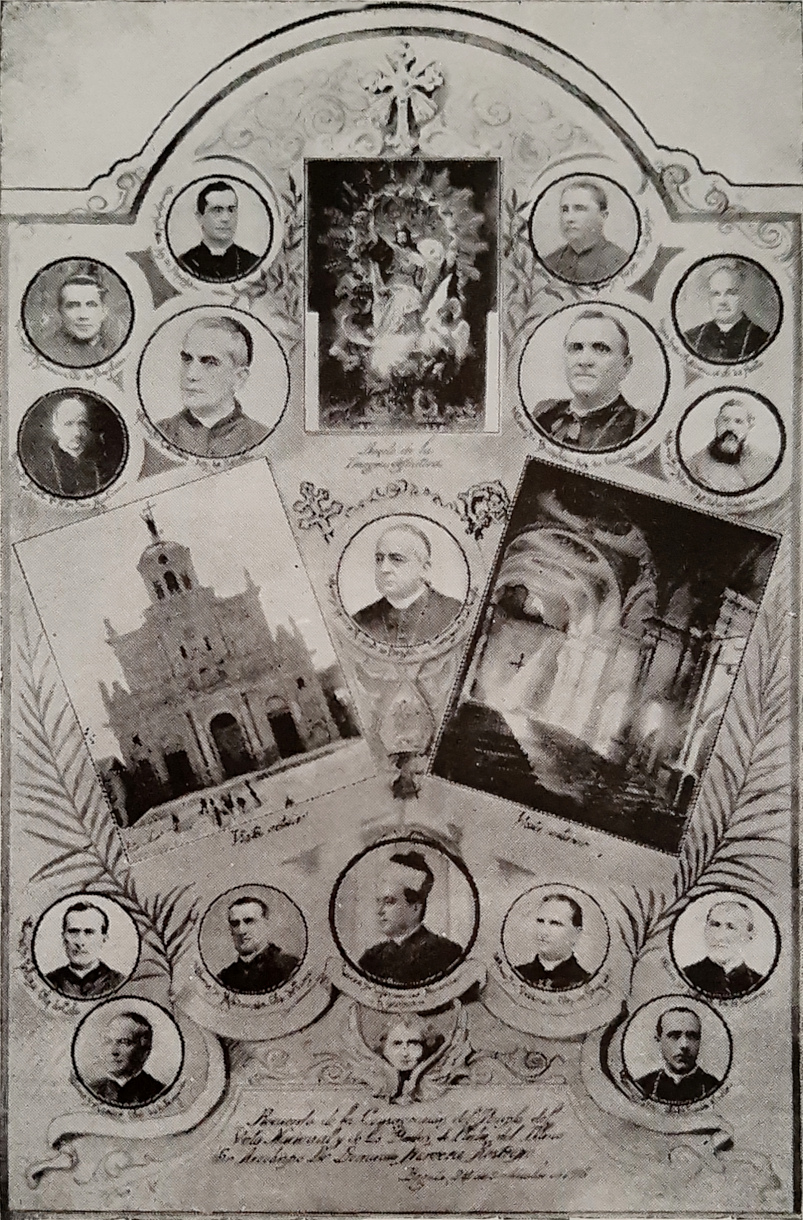
D) Commemorative illustration with the prelates who attended the ceremony.

Consecration ceremony of the Temple of the Voto Nacional. The consecration of the Temple of the Voto Nacional took place on 24 September 1916, during which the nuncio Enrico Gasparri officiated Mass, assisted by 3 archbishops and 10 bishops. With the attendance of President José Vicente Concha.

=== 1916–1938. Enlargement and embellishment ===
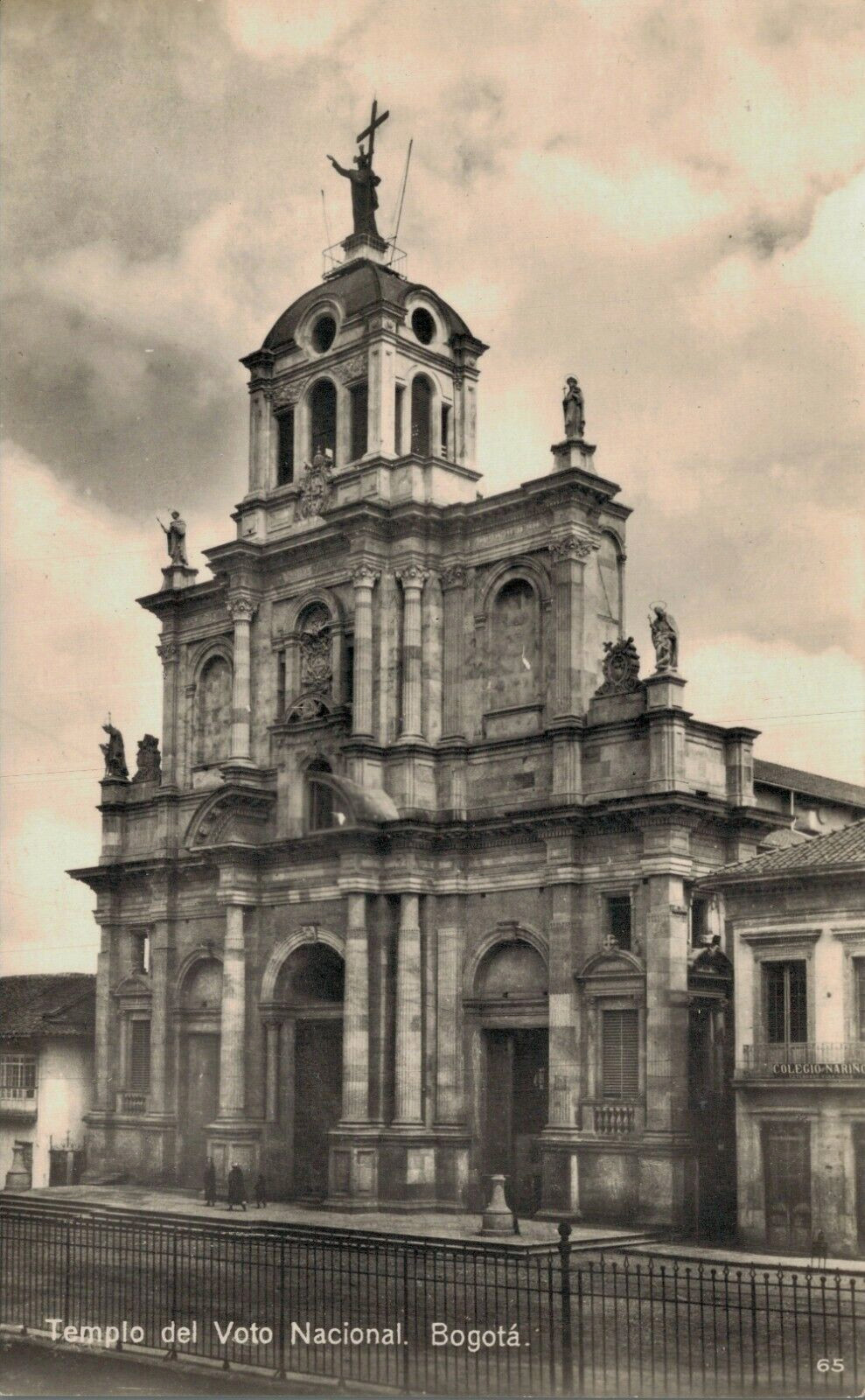
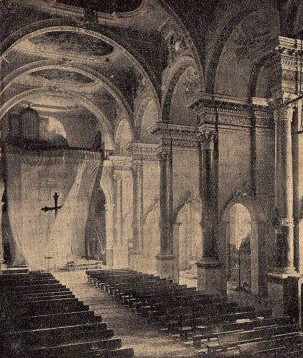
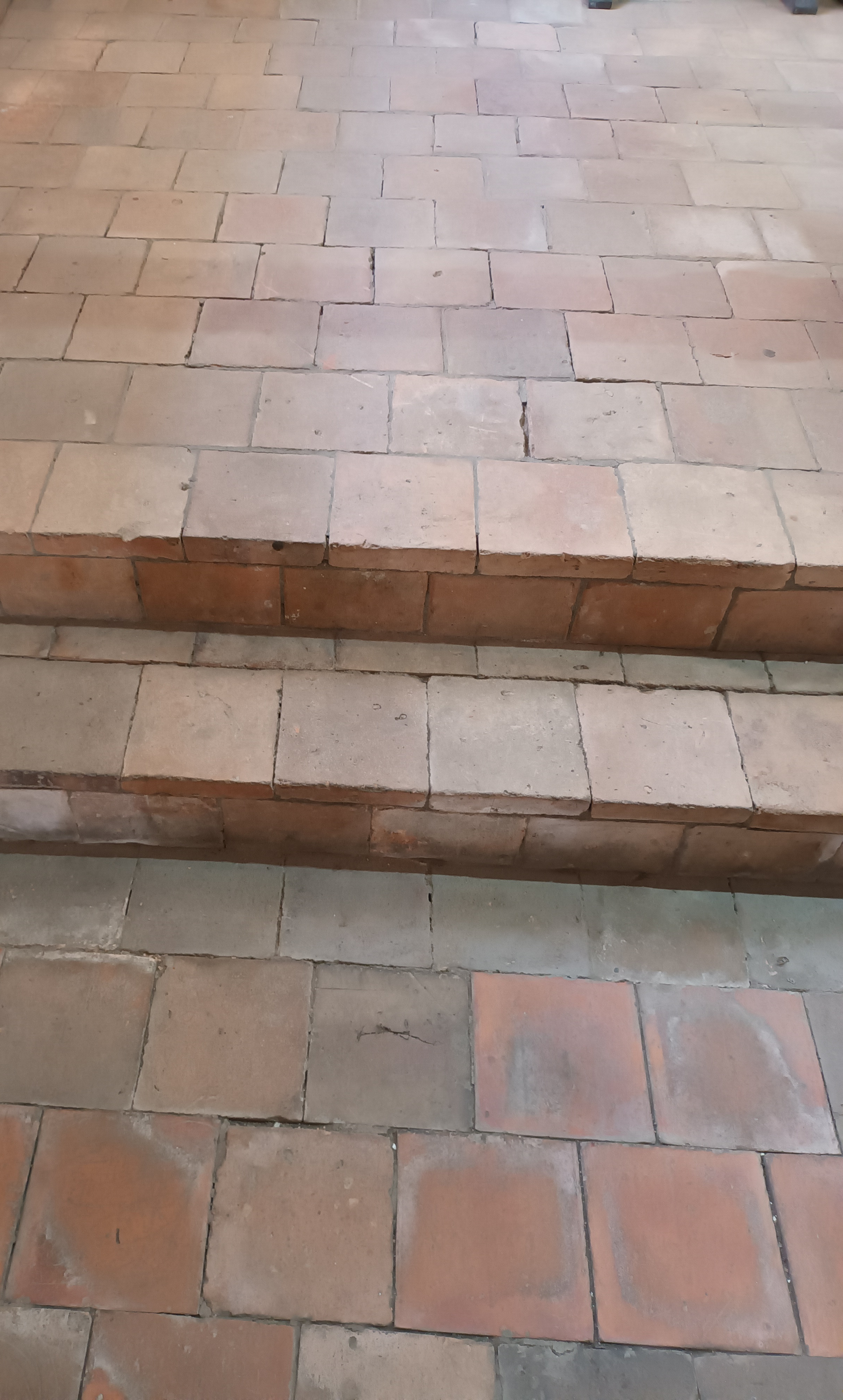
Left. Postcard of the Temple between 1916 and 1927. This is the appearance of the temple when it was inaugurated; note that the capitals of the columns on the lower part of the façade are missing, which were installed in 1927; nor does it have the clock with its cuckoo, which were installed in 1938. Center. Interior of the Temple in 1916 days before the Consecration, you can see the first organ it had. Right. A clear example of a "brick" pavement can be seen, like the one the temple had at its inauguration; it is actually a handmade terracotta tile, which is a type of ceramic tile.

The consecration of the temple in September 1916 was considered solemn and significant, although Fr. Antonio María Pueyo de Val acknowledged that the building remained unfinished. In a letter to Rome dated December 1916, he reported the consecration of fifteen altars and requested support to complete the temple, as well as resources for a future project dedicated to the Heart of Mary. In the same year, Fr. Pueyo acquired a property on Calle 10 in the name of the Claretian community, which later housed the missionaries’ residence and served as accommodation for clergy arriving in Bogotá.

On 20 July 1917, the inauguration of the new Estación de la Sabana increased economic activity in the surrounding area, turning the sector between the station and the temple into a commercial hub.

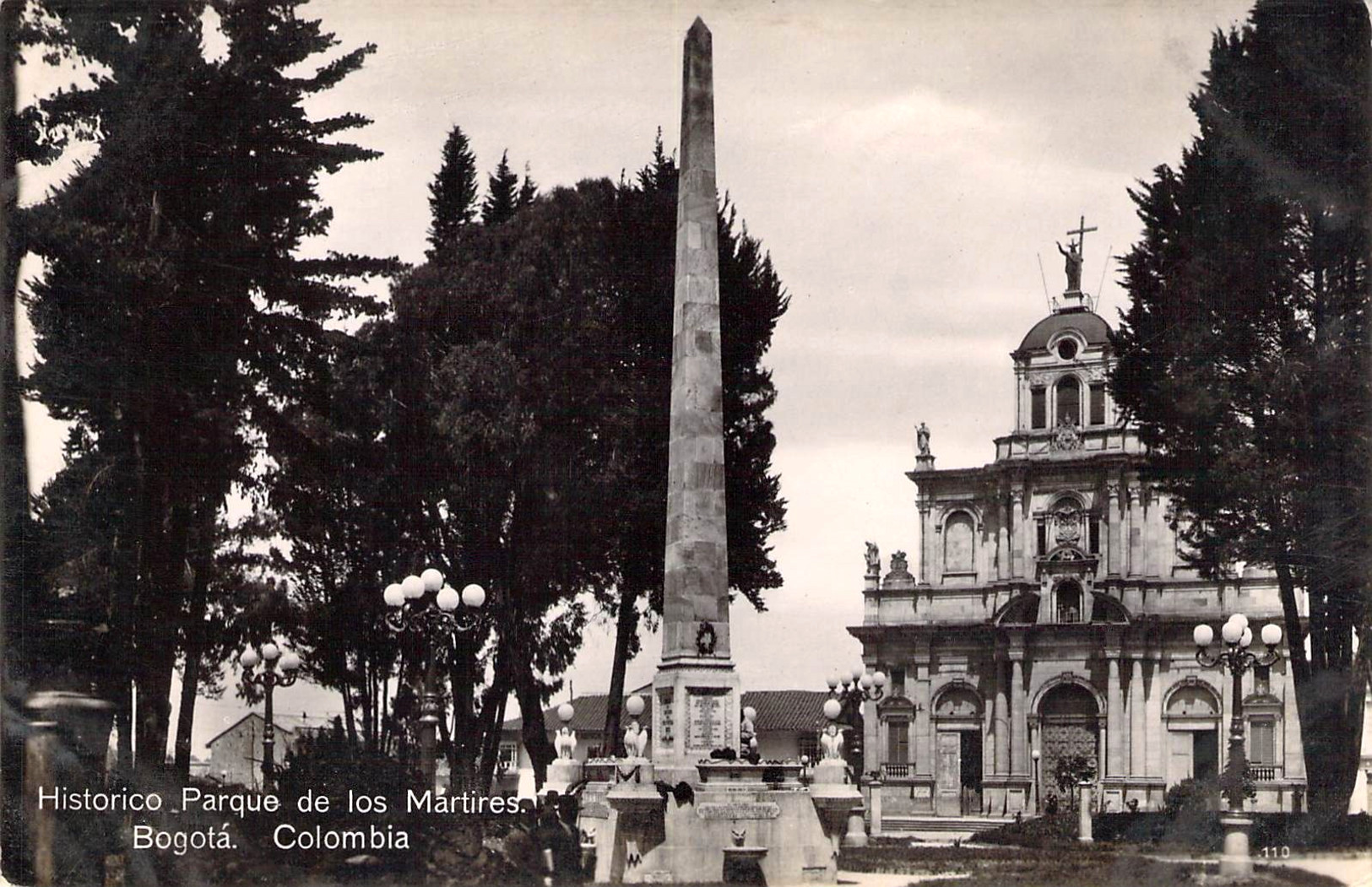
Postcard of Parque de Los Mártires and the Temple between 1916 and 1927.

On 26 November 1917, Fr. Pueyo was appointed bishop of Pasto and was consecrated on 6 January 1918 in the Voto Nacional temple, in a ceremony attended by President José Vicente Concha and other political and ecclesiastical figures. (Note: The President of the Republic gave a chalice to the newly ordained bishop and gave a banquet in his honor. The next day, when he left for Pasto, Bishop Pueyo did not take the gifts received for his consecration: chalices, crosses, ornaments, cards or flowers, they remained in his cell (room). Mesa Gómez, Carlos Eduardo (1984). El padre Pueyo Obispo de Pasto, 1917–1929 [Father Pueyo, Bishop of Pasto, 1917–1929] (in Spanish). Medellín: Editorial Zuluaga. p. 68.)

That same day, he confirmed approximately 200 children in the church. Shortly after, an agreement was signed defining the conditions under which the Claretian community would assume administration of the temple. In 1918, the nearby School of Medicine of the National University was partially inaugurated, contributing to the development of the surrounding area.

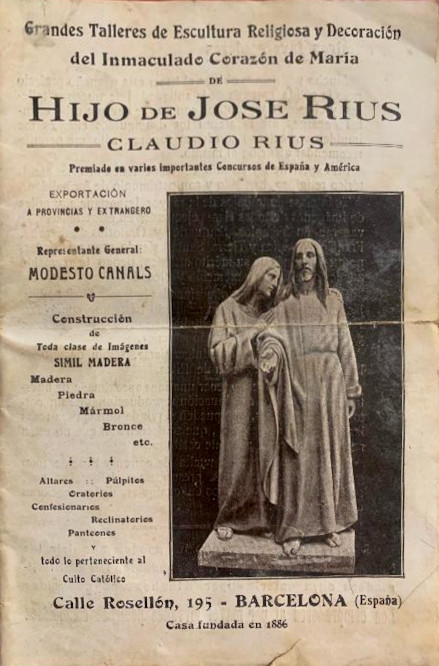
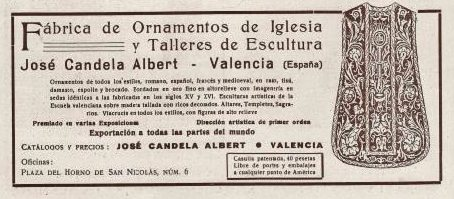
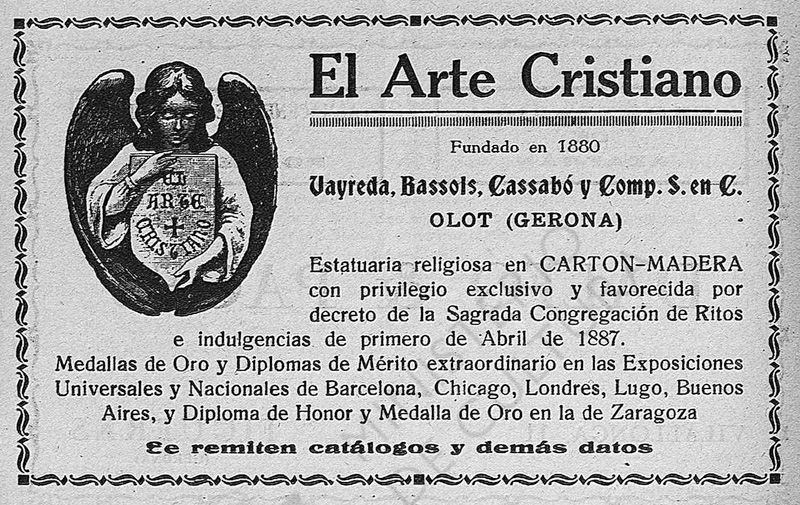
In 1919, devotional and artistic activity expanded. New religious images were commissioned from workshops in Spain, including works from Valencia, Barcelona, and Olot, while others were acquired locally. (Note: Cover of a catalog of the Casa Ruis. The sculptor José Rius was born in Barcelona, Spain, into a humble home, and at an early age showed interest in sculpture. At the age of 15, he became an assistant in the workshop of who would later become his father-in-law, the sculptor Claudio Garrich, from whom he learned the trade. In 1886, together with his father-in-law, he founded the Casa Rius, with facilities located at Calle Claris, No. 69 in Barcelona. The workshop initially focused on religious and nativity scene sculpture. Thanks to signed contracts and his efforts, in 1914 he had the new workshop headquarters built at Calle Rosselló, No. 195 in Barcelona; the workshop was located on the ground floor of the building and the family home was on the second floor of the same building. In the workshop, sculpture was done in carved wood, but also offered in other materials such as stone, marble, bronze, and in "simili-wood" paste, which could be blessed or "indulgenced" and therefore suitable for worship according to a decree of the Sacred Congregation of Rites and Indulgences. Due to health problems, José Rius stopped being at the helm of the workshop but remained involved and creating works. In 1918, his son, the sculptor Claudio Rius Garrich, took charge of the company; he had studied at the Academy of Fine Arts and at the Círculo Artístico San Lucas in Barcelona. He learned to model in his father's own workshop and in the workshop of Antonio Parera Saurina. He was also a disciple of the sculptor José Llimona Bruguera, of great renown in Catalan modernist sculpture of the 20th century. The style of Claudio Rius Garrich conveys expressiveness and religious emotion to his imagery, inspired by classical Spanish sculptors of the 16th and 17th centuries. The workshop expanded to other areas of sacred art, moving from only creating images to altars, stained glass, metalwork, temple decoration, in short, everything related to sculpture and religious ornamentation. The workshop, which under different names continued until well into the sixties, and through which a large number of sculptors passed, enjoyed great prestige. The name of the workshop appears in some printed media as "Gran Taller de Escultura Religiosa de José Rius", "Grandes Talleres de Escultura Religiosa y Decoración del Inmaculado Corazón de María". Claudio Rius Garrich died in Barcelona in 1970 at the age of 77, and shortly after the workshop disappeared.: Hermandad de la Pasión del Señor de Pamplona. José Rius. Retrieved 4 May 2024.; Hermandad del Santísimo Cristo de la Caridad de Ciudad Real. Claudio Rius Garrich. Retrieved 4 May 2024.) (Note: Publicity advertisement in a Spanish media outlet in 1919. The Casa Candela was a prominent Spanish company specializing in sacred textile ornaments and religious imagery. José Candela Albert was a prominent Spanish businessman; his workshop established in Valencia, Spain, began in the area of sacred textile ornaments for the church, achieving a high degree of recognition, largely due to the diplomatic qualities of its founder, who received the Regium Exequatur in 1913, thus being accredited and authorized to serve as Vice Consul of Colombia in Valencia. The diplomat and businessman made maximum use of his international contacts and his magnificent relations with the Catholic hierarchy to obtain orders that gave his business a certain international importance, particularly among the Spanish-American and North American clergy, thus receiving orders from Canada to South America. With all this commercial progress, his workshop ventured into the sculpture market. References initially place his workshop on Calle Pinzón around 1914, then he moved his headquarters to number 18 on Calle Santo Tomás, as references already place him there; this change was possibly due to the expansion of the company, which now included sculpture. In the 1930s, the workshop moved again, the third in its history, which in 1931 was located in Plaza de San Pablo. Alongside his business work, José Candela developed an active public life in Valencian business circles, along with his diplomatic role, in which he progressed to the rank of Consul. In the twenties and thirties of the 20th century, he gave lectures on economics, was a member of the Publications Commission of the Official Chamber of Urban Property, held various positions in the Chamber of Commerce, participating among others in the Industrial Silk Committee and the Valencian Society for Tourism Promotion, was a member of the Valencian Charity Board, the Port Works Board, and contributed to the newspaper Las Provincias, in which, taking advantage of the platform offered, he promoted transatlantic and Spanish-American trade relations. After the Spanish Civil War, traces of his company in Valencia are lost; it is unknown whether it could not survive the war and the post-war crisis or whether the businessman simply sought a better location for his businesses and established them elsewhere, although he continued his consular activity. José Candela died in 1961.: Fernández Serrano, Gumersindo; Ibáñez López, Enrique (7 March 2018). Especial Fallas: Sederías José Candela Albert. Retrieved 3 May 2024.) (Note: Publicity advertisement in a Spanish media outlet in 1928. El Arte Cristiano is a Spanish company specializing in religious imagery and nativity scene figures with over 130 years of history. Around 1850, there was a very important textile activity in Olot, Spain (cotton manufacturers, weavers, etc.), therefore an artisanal base already existed. To support this industry, a public drawing school was created to teach young people graphic arts. In the Province of Girona, the first religious imagery industry (with a textile base) was born. In 1880, the religious sculpture company called "Vayreda, Berga y Cía" was established, which two years later became "El Arte Cristiano". Several artists, including sculptors of international renown, have passed through the workshops of said company, creating sculptures that have contributed to the brand's prestige and have also been exported to various nations on the five continents. At El Arte Cristiano, they were innovators in introducing a new material and a new molding technique, specifically cardboard-wood paste, which lightens the molding process and therefore speeds up the creation of images. The company still continues to produce and market its numerous original models, although from the beginning it also works with wood carvings and currently uses new materials such as fiberglass, polyester resin with calcium carbonate, among others.: El Arte Cristiano. «Historia ». Retrieved 3 May 2024.) That same year, Fr. Villarroya founded the Revista El Voto Nacional, and new pavement made of hydraulic tiles was installed in the church.

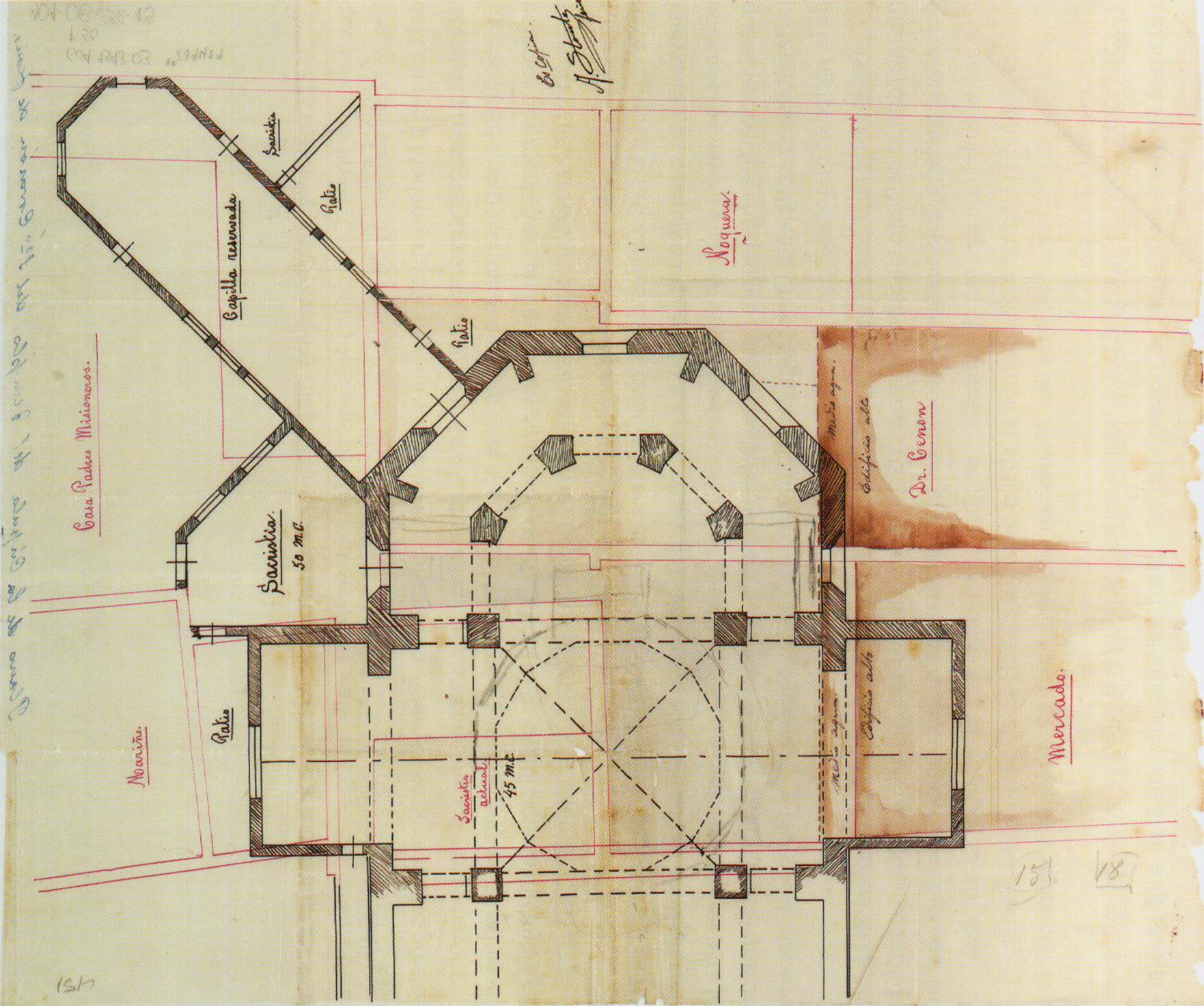
Left. Plan of the intended enlargement of the Voto Nacional temple. Signed Antonio Stoute. Undated.

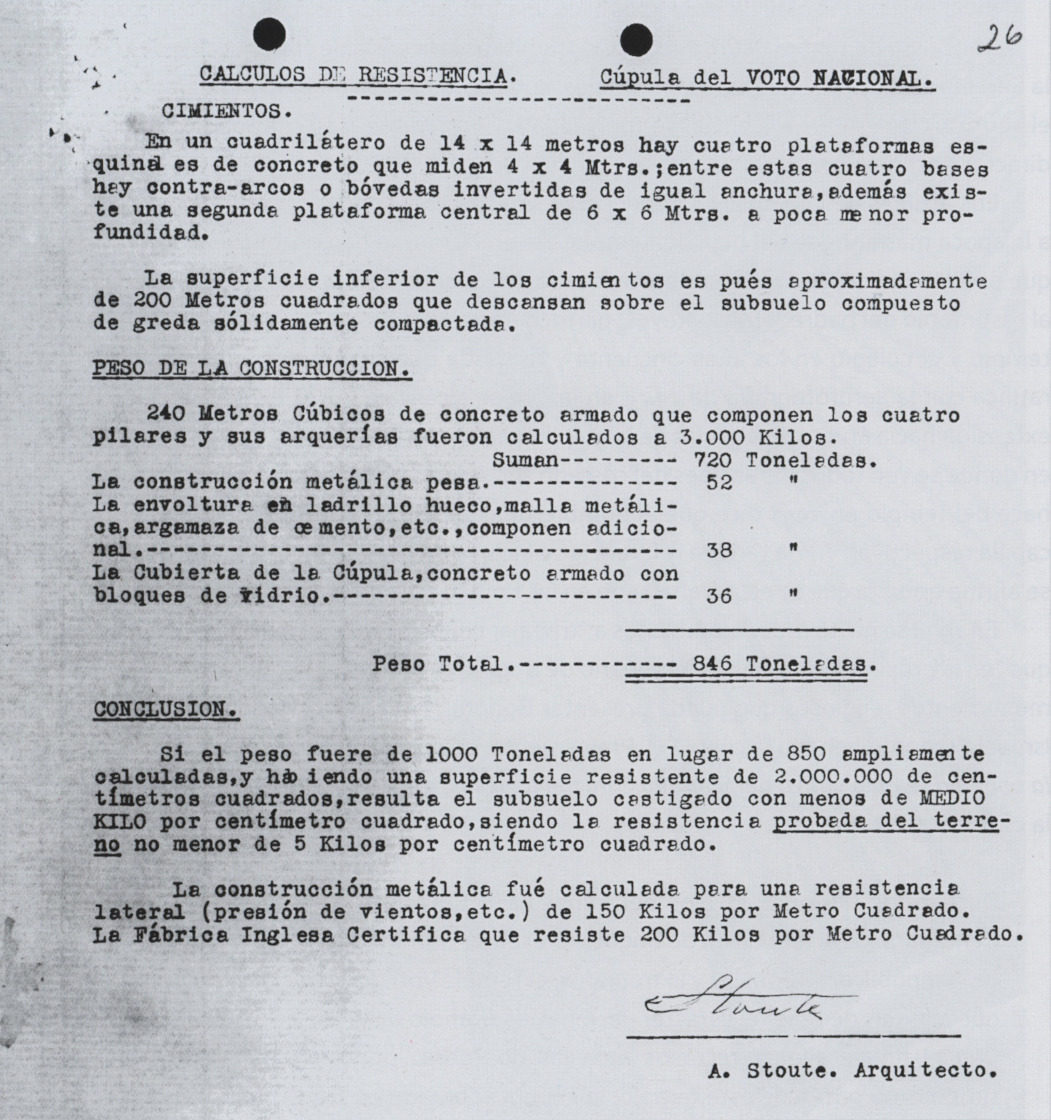
Right. Fragment of the Dome construction permit file. Signed by Antonio Stoute.

Between 1917 and 1920, Ricardo Acevedo Bernal painted ten ceiling works for the central nave, commissioned by Fr. Pueyo.

Between 1925 and 1927, additional land was acquired to expand the temple, enabling the construction of the transept and dome under Dutch architect Antonio Stoute. The project also included new crypts and was financed through public donations and government support. In 1927, electric lighting was installed, decorative works on the façade were completed, and Archbishop Bernardo Herrera Restrepo died, succeeded by Ismael Perdomo Borrero. During the 1930s, major works continued, including the arrival of bells, a pipe organ from Spain, and the installation of the dome's iron structure and stained glass.

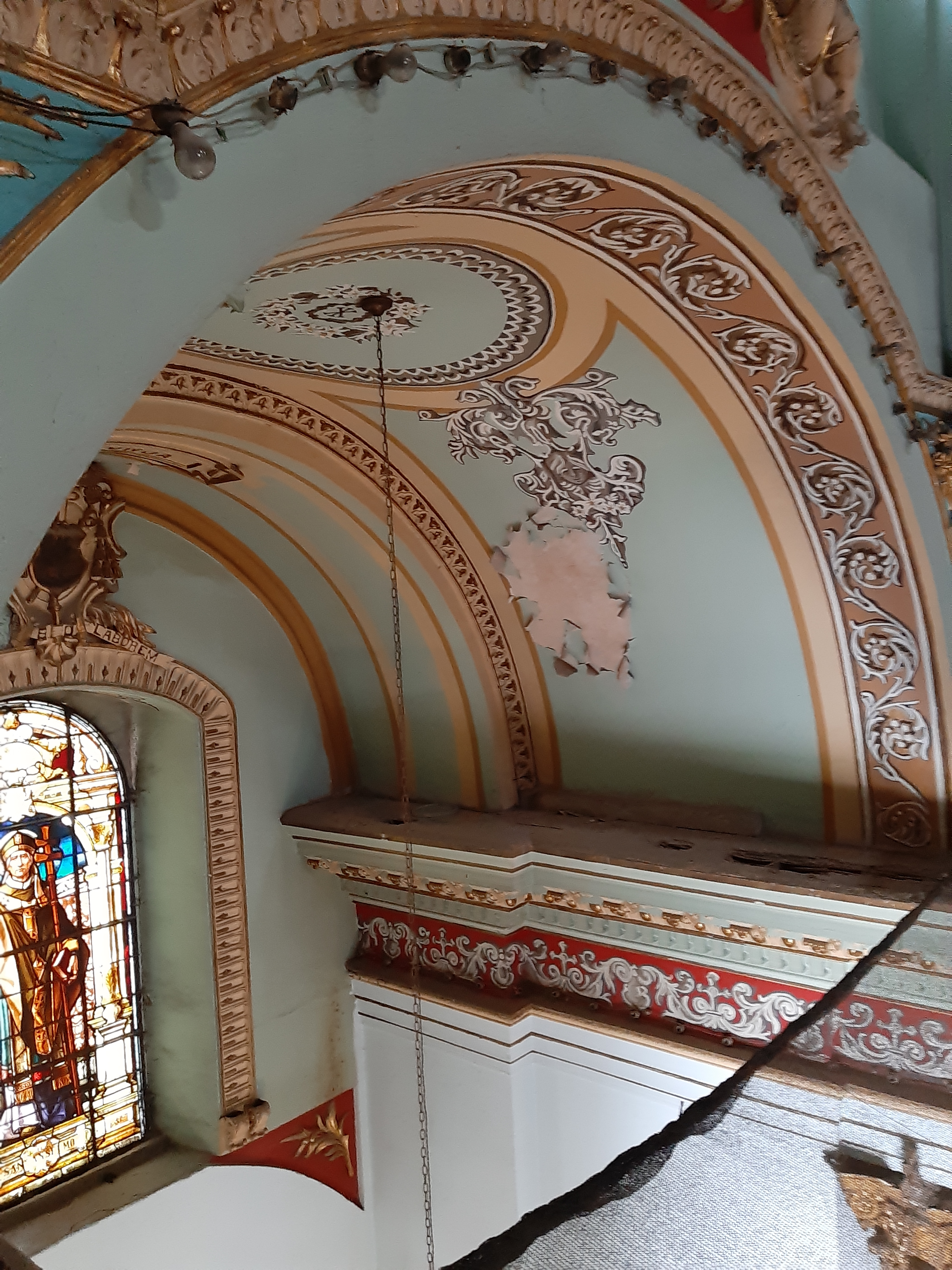
Vestiges of the electric lighting installed in 1927 in arches and cornices.

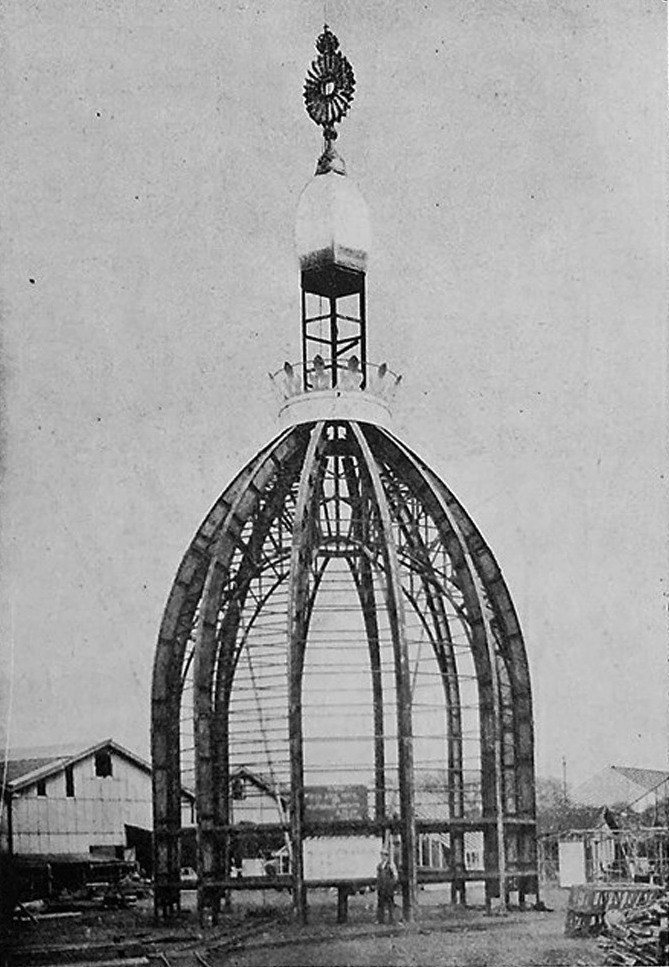
Left. Metal frame of the dome in 1936, which began to be assembled at ground level.

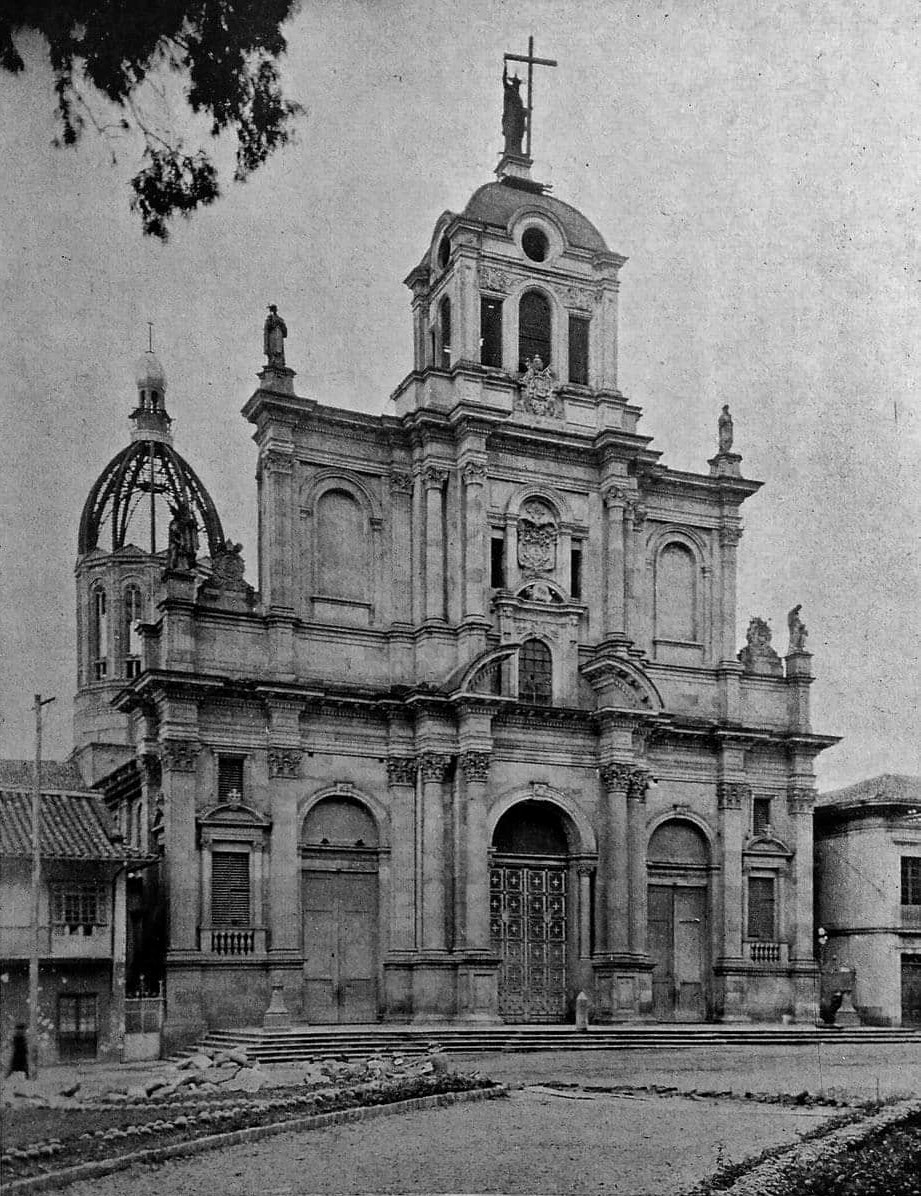
Right. View of the Temple with the dome frame already assembled in 1938.

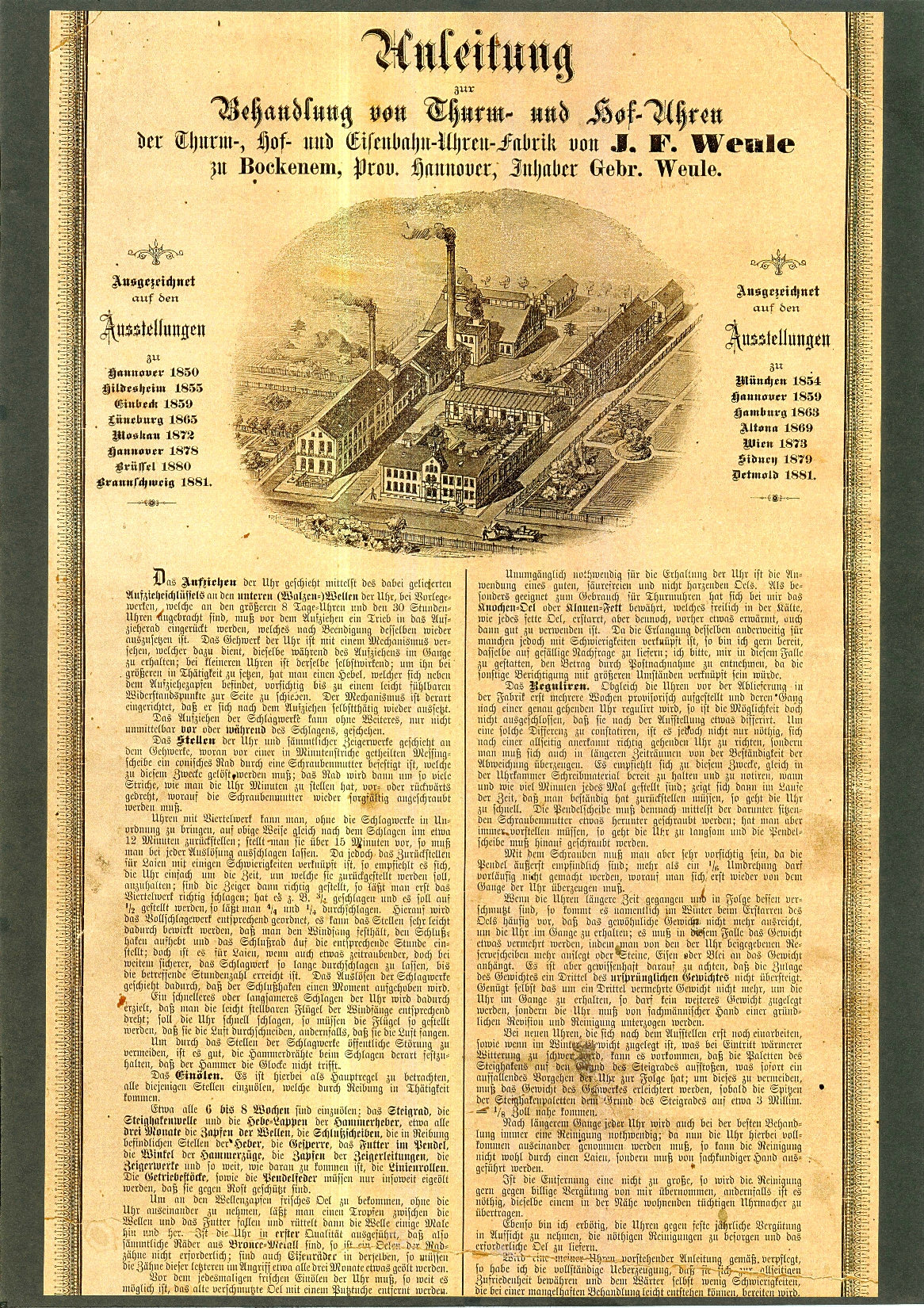
The dome was completed in 1938, when Bogotá's municipal government donated a tower clock manufactured in Germany. That same year, the dome, transept, and clock were inaugurated with a solemn ceremony led by Archbishop Perdomo. (Note: Maintenance instructions for a J. F. Weule tower clock from 1906. The image of the factory facilities, which are now demolished, can be seen. J. F. Weule was a renowned German factory for tower clocks and bell foundries in the town of Bockenem in Lower Saxony (Germany), which existed from 1836 to 1966. The company's products were characterized by their high quality, durability, and relatively good accuracy. The company also manufactured station and street clocks. The company was founded on 20 October 1836 by the clockmaker Johann Friedrich Weule (1811–1897), who developed a mechanism that only needed to be wound once a week and not daily as was customary. This increased his reputation as an excellent and innovative clockmaker and allowed the company to develop rapidly. The founder passed the company to his son Friedrich Weule (1855–1952) in 1879, who carried out expansion and modernization. He began casting bells around 1880 and later exported his products worldwide. Around 1913, Friedrich Weule's son, engineer Friedrich Weule Jr. (1883–1954), began managing the company, but during the First World War, he was drafted for military service and his father was again at the helm of the company, which now manufactured grenades and other war equipment. Furthermore, from 1917 onwards, iron bells were cast instead of bronze, as bronze bells were donated throughout Germany to be melted down for armament purposes. After the First World War, Friedrich Weule Jr. again took over the management of the company and continued to develop the business, especially overcoming the crisis between 1930 and 1932. During the Second World War, the company again manufactured military armaments, but shortly after the end of the war, around 85 employees returned to making tower clocks and bells. In 1951, a second partner joined the company and attempts were made to build textile machinery. But on 18 March 1953, the textile machinery industry went bankrupt. In 1954, Friedrich Weule Jr. died after having managed the company for 40 years. Around 140 employees became unemployed. Some were able to return to their usual work on 20 December 1954 because the company "Wilhelmshütte" took over and continued the business. The company name Weule became Wilhelmshütte Werk Bockenem. In addition to tower clocks and bells, dials, other types of clocks, bells, and carillons were built and sold. After the acquisition, the production range was expanded to include kitchen parts and ovens, but the Wilhelmshütte company filed for bankruptcy in 1966, the Weule operation could no longer be sustained and thus ended 129 years of history. • This text contains translated material from «J. F. Weule» from the German Wikipedia.)

By this period, the temple had become a center of intense religious activity, including Marian devotions, Eucharistic Thursdays, confraternities, and lay associations that organized processions and devotional practices in the surrounding area.

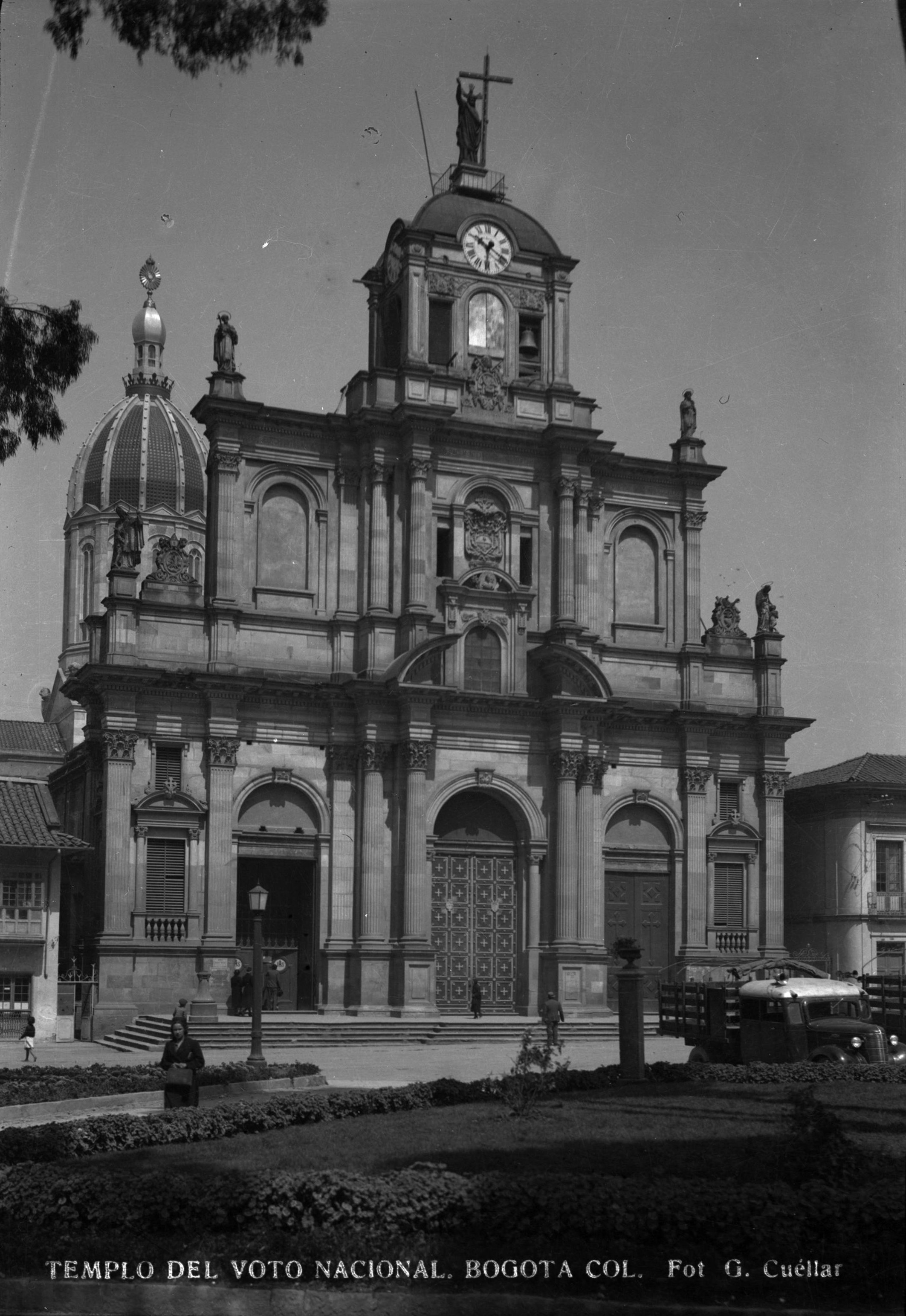
A

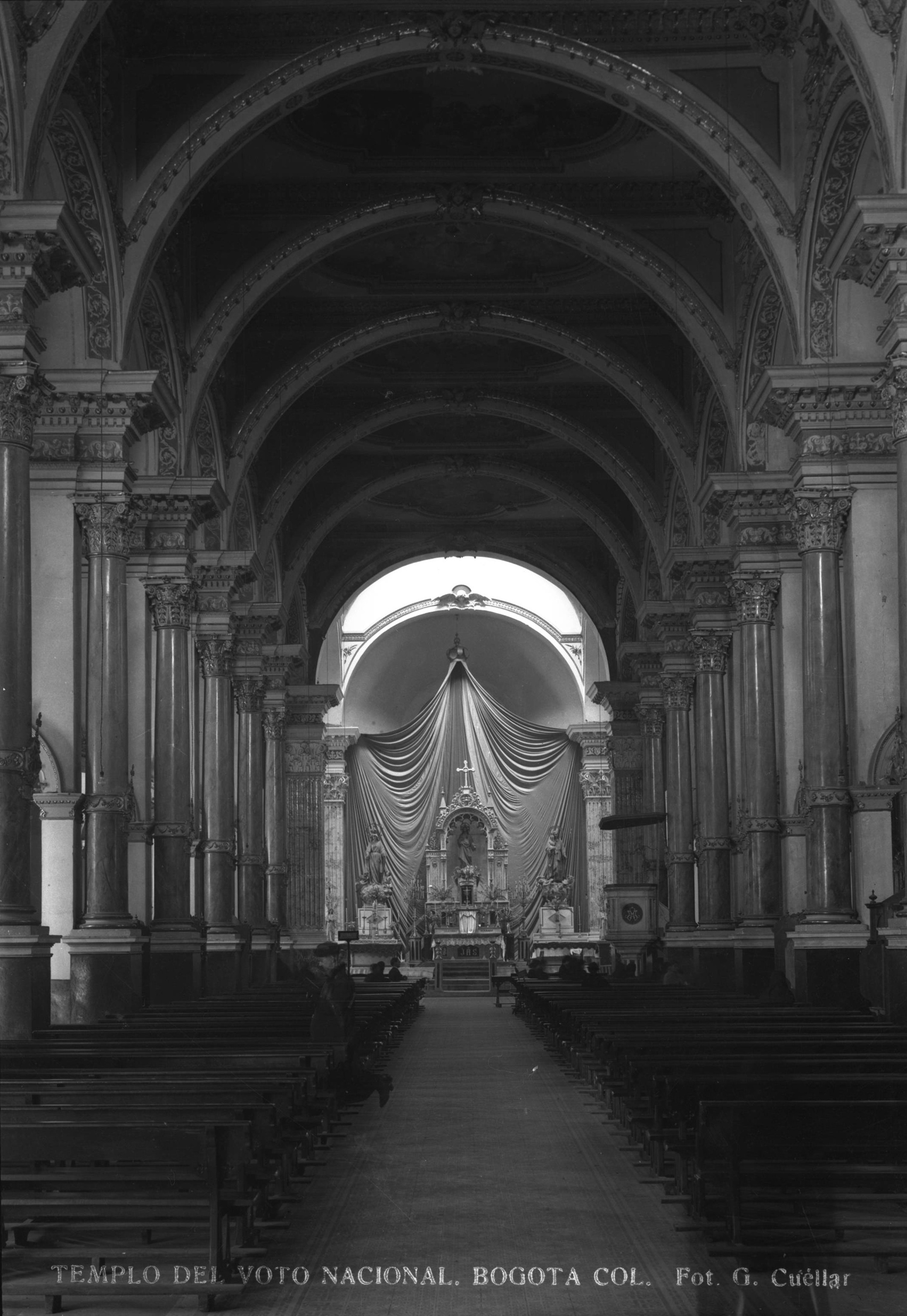
B

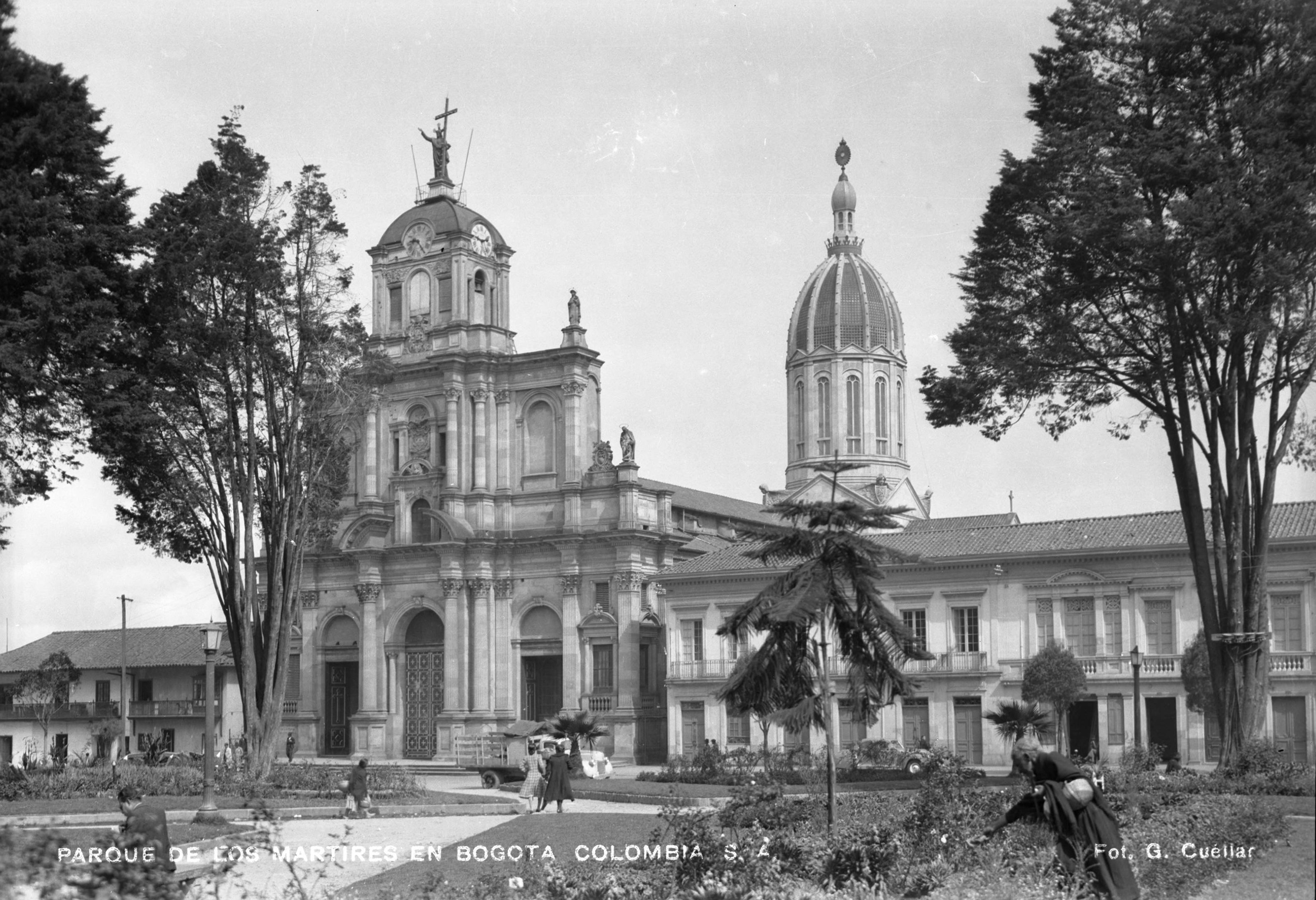
C

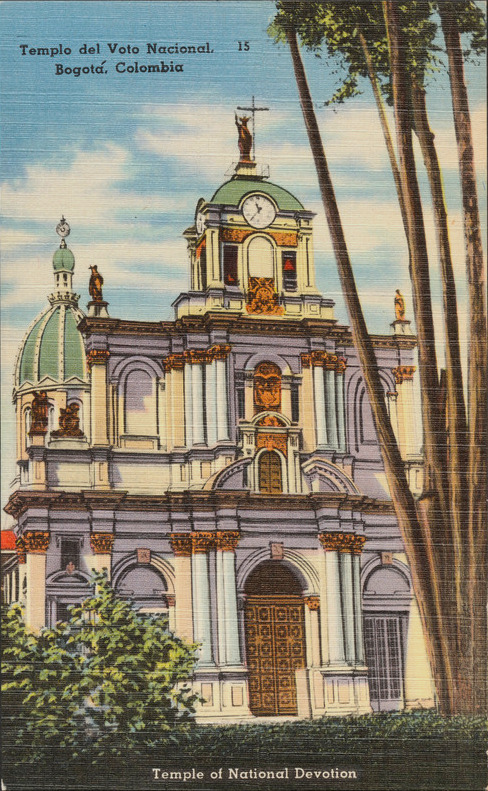
D

A) The Temple with the fully completed dome and the clock installed in 1938, all ready for the inauguration of the extension, which was on 21 August of the same year. B) View of the interior of the temple prepared for the inauguration of the extension. In the background, the presbytery area can be seen being illuminated by natural light coming from the double glass dome system, which highlights the importance of that area in the temple. Also visible is the second main altarpiece the temple had in its former splendor; it has currently lost some details, it is located in the north arm of the transept and is where Saint Anthony Mary Claret is venerated. The pulpit the temple had is also visible. C) Panoramic view of the temple from Parque de Los Mártires. The dome stands out for its elongated drum. D) Illuminated postcard from the mid-1940s, showing the completed temple, although the colors do not correspond to reality; for example, the dome has a greenish color like the patina of copper, suggesting it is made of that metal.

=== 1938–2012. From radiance to decay ===
From the 1930s, after the Liberal Party came to power, presidential participation in the annual renewal of the consecration of Colombia to the Sacred Heart at the Voto Nacional declined. In 1945, Pope Pope Pius XII praised the temple in a radio message, recalling its symbolic role in Colombia's peace and religious devotion.

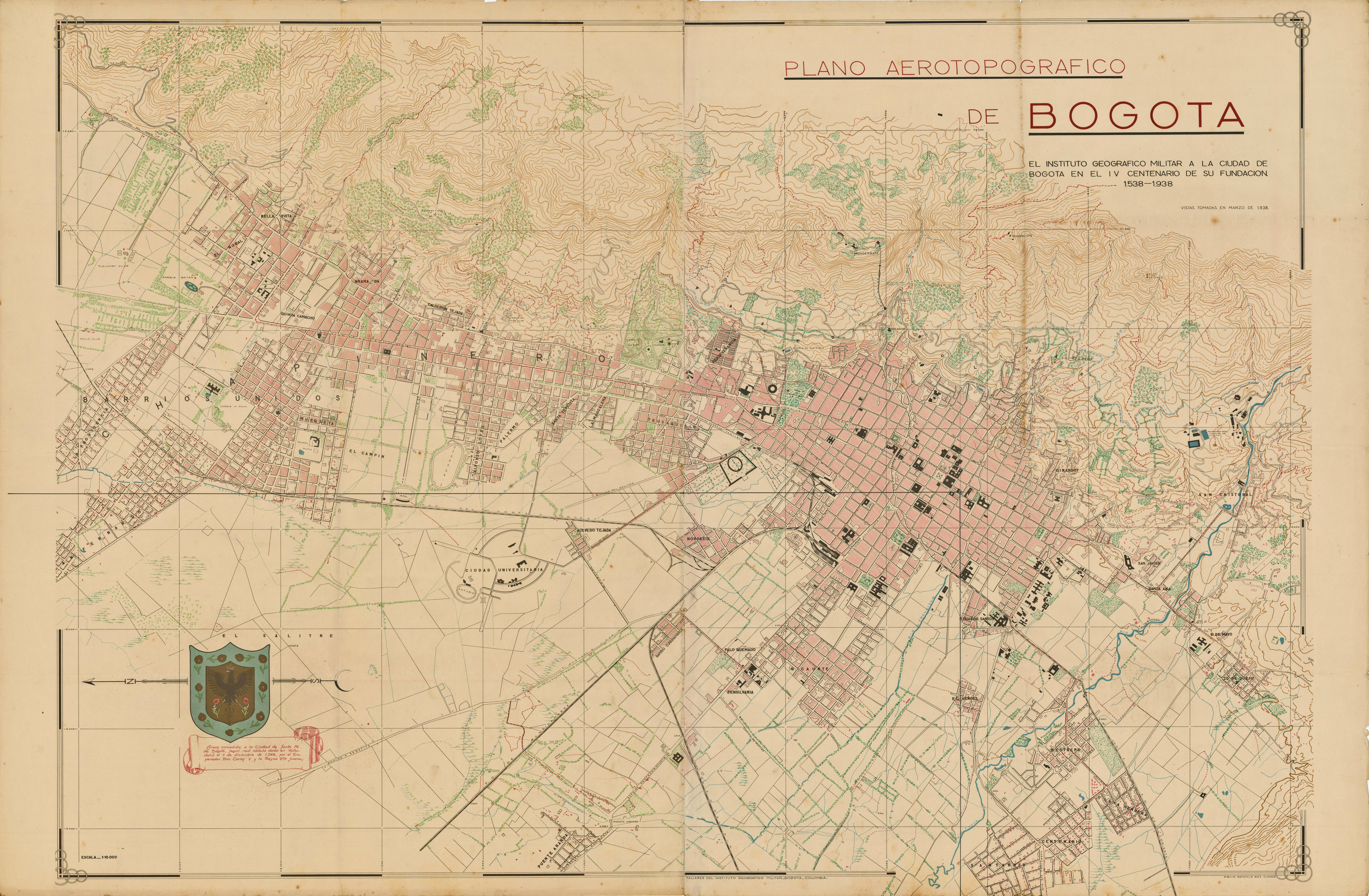
Map of Bogotá in 1938. Later, as a consequence of the social deterioration that
the Los Mártires sector began to suffer, the wealthy families living around the
Temple began to emigrate to the north of the city, which was experiencing great
urban development. The map shows the location of the Plaza de Bolívar (blue
dot), the Plaza de Los Mártires (red dot), the Estación de la Sabana (yellow dot),
which inaugurated its new, larger facilities in 1917, and the Our Lady of Lourdes
Church (green dot).

In 1942, the church was elevated to parish status by Decree No. 16, entrusted to the Claretian missionaries, with Fr. Alfredo Martínez as its first parish priest (1942–1948). That year also saw the donation of the baptismal font and a marked increase in parish activity, with baptisms, marriages, and communions rising significantly in subsequent years.

Urban transformation affected the surrounding area. In 1947–1948, the construction of Avenida Caracas divided Plaza de los Mártires and altered its urban continuity, accelerating commercial decline and social change in the sector. (Note: Talleres de Arte Granda is a Spanish company specialized in sacred art, founded in 1891 under the name Talleres de Arte by the priest and artist Félix Granda at the age of 23 and newly ordained as a priest, for which he received permission to carry out his artistic work, allowing him to direct the workshop until his death in 1954. After his death, the company became known as Talleres de Arte Granda. The workshop specializes in sacred art, dedicated to the artisanal production of objects for worship and the fitting out and restoration of churches on five continents. They produce all kinds of artistic pieces intended for worship: altarpieces, sculptures, goldsmith works, and textile ornaments; unique pieces, handmade by a multidisciplinary team made up of architects, draftsmen, art historians, sculptors, silversmiths, polychromers, restorers, carpenters, chiselers, and embroiderers, among others. In 2000, the subsidiary Granda Liturgical Arts was established in Chicago, serving the North American market.: Talleres de Arte Granda. Nuestra historia. Retrieved 4 May 2024.; Asociación Española de Empresas de Restauración del Patrimonio Histórico. Talleres de Arte Granda, S.A. Retrieved 4 May 2024.) The 1948 riots further damaged infrastructure, including the church dome. Despite this, artistic and devotional projects continued. In 1950, a contract was signed with the Granda workshops in Spain for the completion of the main altar originally designed decades earlier by Ricardo Acevedo Bernal. (Note: The Monserrate temple was for a time in charge of the Claretians. • Reina Mendoza, Sandra (2016). Paz y el Sagrado Corazón: Iglesia del Voto Nacional [Peace and the Sacred Heart: Church of the National Vow] (in Spanish). Bogotá: Instituto Distrital de Patrimonio Cultural. p. 100.)

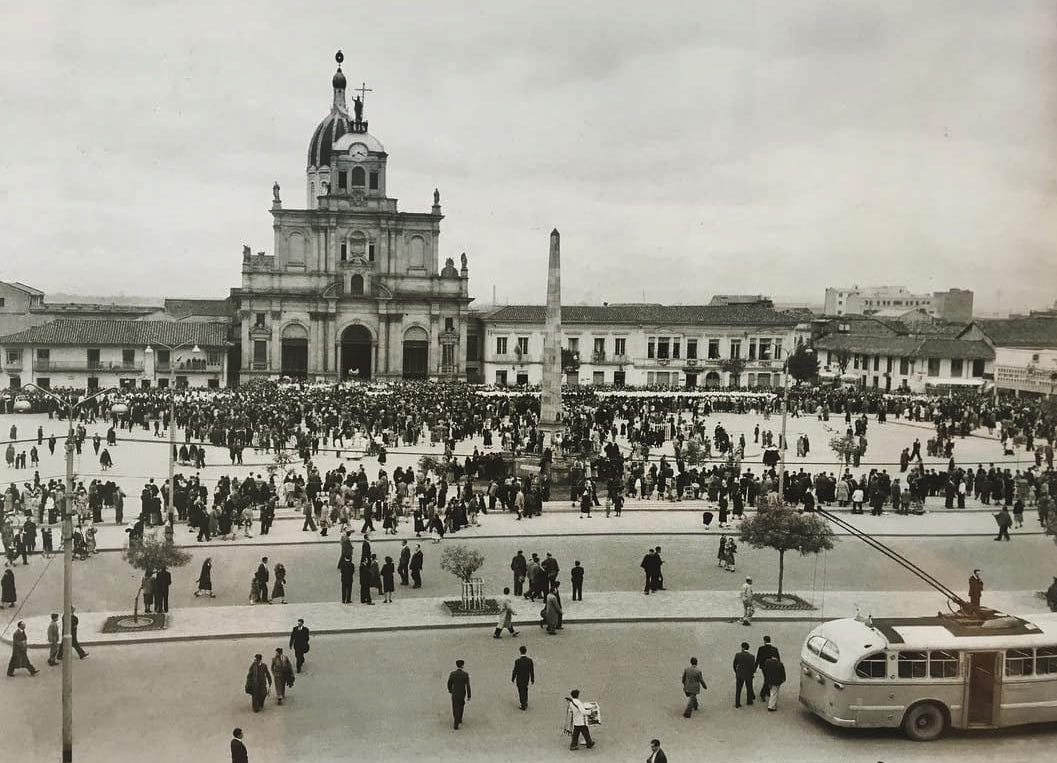
Plaza de los Mártires and the Church of the National Vow, during the commemoration of the first fifty years of the National Vow, on 20 June 1952.

After the violence of 1948, national efforts to promote reconciliation included renewed public devotion. In 1952, President Roberto Urdaneta Arbeláez and Apostolic Nuncio Antonio Samoré promoted a peace campaign, and 8 January was declared a national day of thanksgiving to the Sacred Heart.

That same year marked the 50th anniversary of the Voto Nacional. The commemoration included large religious ceremonies, processions, and a renewal of the national vow by the president. The Granda workshops also completed and installed a new main altar and related liturgical elements in 1952–1953, followed by decorative additions such as chandeliers and furnishings in 1954.

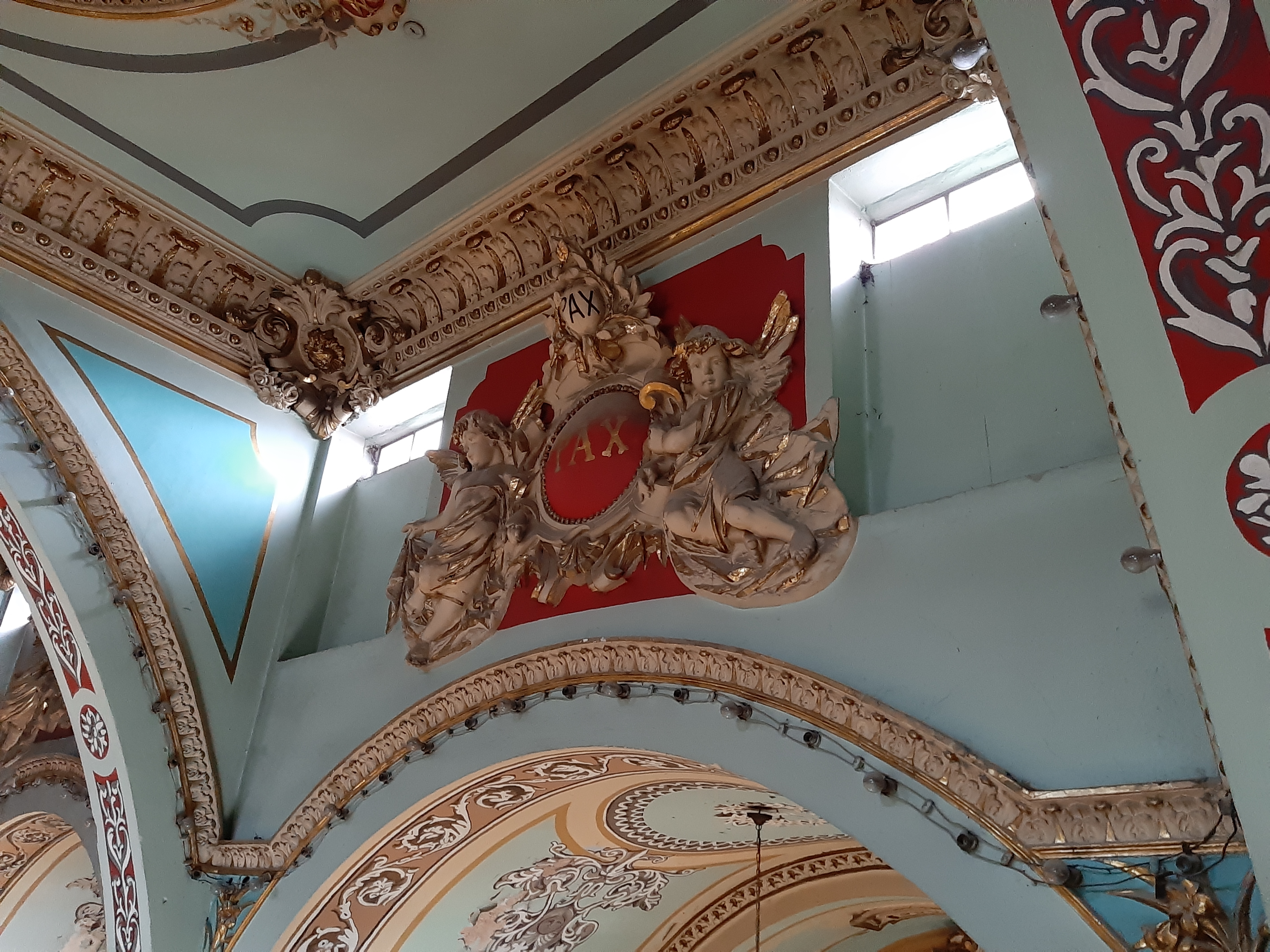
The image shows angels and moldings, plasterwork by the artist Colombo Ramelli, of the Ramelli workshop. The word pax (peace in Latin) appears throughout the temple about 200 times. In 1956, small windows were opened high up in the longitudinal nave (like a clerestory), improving illumination.

During the 1950s, further restoration and expansion works were carried out in the temple, including improvements to sacristy, crypts, and lighting, as well as repairs to damage caused in 1948. The surrounding area, however, underwent rapid social decline following urban displacement and the relocation of commercial activity.

In 1956, the visit of the relic of Anthony Mary Claret to Bogotá included ceremonies at the Voto Nacional, attended by President Gustavo Rojas Pinilla, who renewed the national vow. That same period also saw the construction of new Claretian facilities adjacent to the church. (Note: It contained premises for the operation of the printing press, which previously operated in a small room in the community house on Calle 10. • Reina Mendoza, Sandra (2016). Paz y el Sagrado Corazón: Iglesia del Voto Nacional [Peace and the Sacred Heart: Church of the National Vow] (in Spanish). Bogotá: Instituto Distrital de Patrimonio Cultural. p. 102.)

Urban interventions in 1960 briefly improved Plaza de los Mártires, while interior restoration works continued in the basilica, including crypt expansion and decorative refurbishment.

Additional liturgical objects and bells were installed in the early 1960s, along with the foundation of educational and pastoral institutions linked to the parish. (Note: The Class neighborhood began as an invasion of land belonging to the Claretian community; therefore, the community preferred not to evict them and instead accommodated them to found the neighborhood, whose name means Secular Claretians. • Reina Mendoza, Sandra (2016). Paz y el Sagrado Corazón: Iglesia del Voto Nacional [Peace and the Sacred Heart: Church of the National Vow] (in Spanish). Bogotá: Instituto Distrital de Patrimonio Cultural. p. 102.) In 1964, Pope Pope Paul VI elevated the church to the dignity of Minor Basilica, a status later confirmed in a solemn ceremony presided over by Cardinal Luis Concha Córdoba.

During the late 1960s and 1970s, administrative changes included the relocation of Claretian facilities and the restructuring of access between parish buildings. The national Te Deum ceremony was moved from the basilica to Bogotá Cathedral in 1971 due to urban decline and security concerns, marking a symbolic reduction in the church's national prominence.

From the 1980s onward, the surrounding Los Mártires district experienced severe deterioration, becoming associated with crime and informal settlements. This affected access to the basilica and led to a significant decline in religious activity and income. By the 1990s, structural damage and insecurity had reached critical levels, prompting urgent restoration efforts. In 1991, the new Constitution of Colombia established religious pluralism and formally ended the practice of national consecration ceremonies, and in 1994 the Constitutional Court annulled the 1952 law related to the civic holiday of the Sacred Heart.

Some examples of the state of deterioration of the temple before restoration

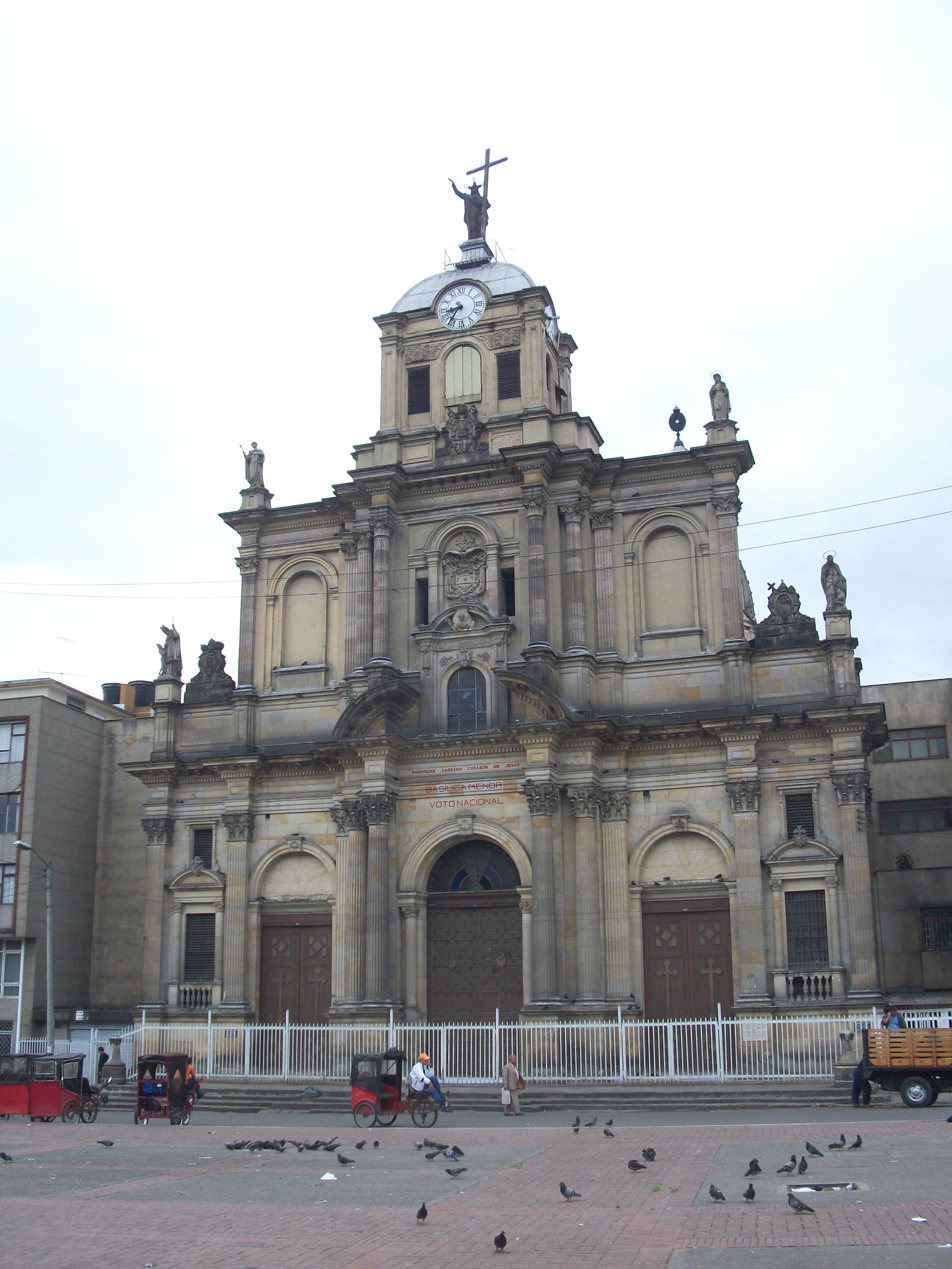

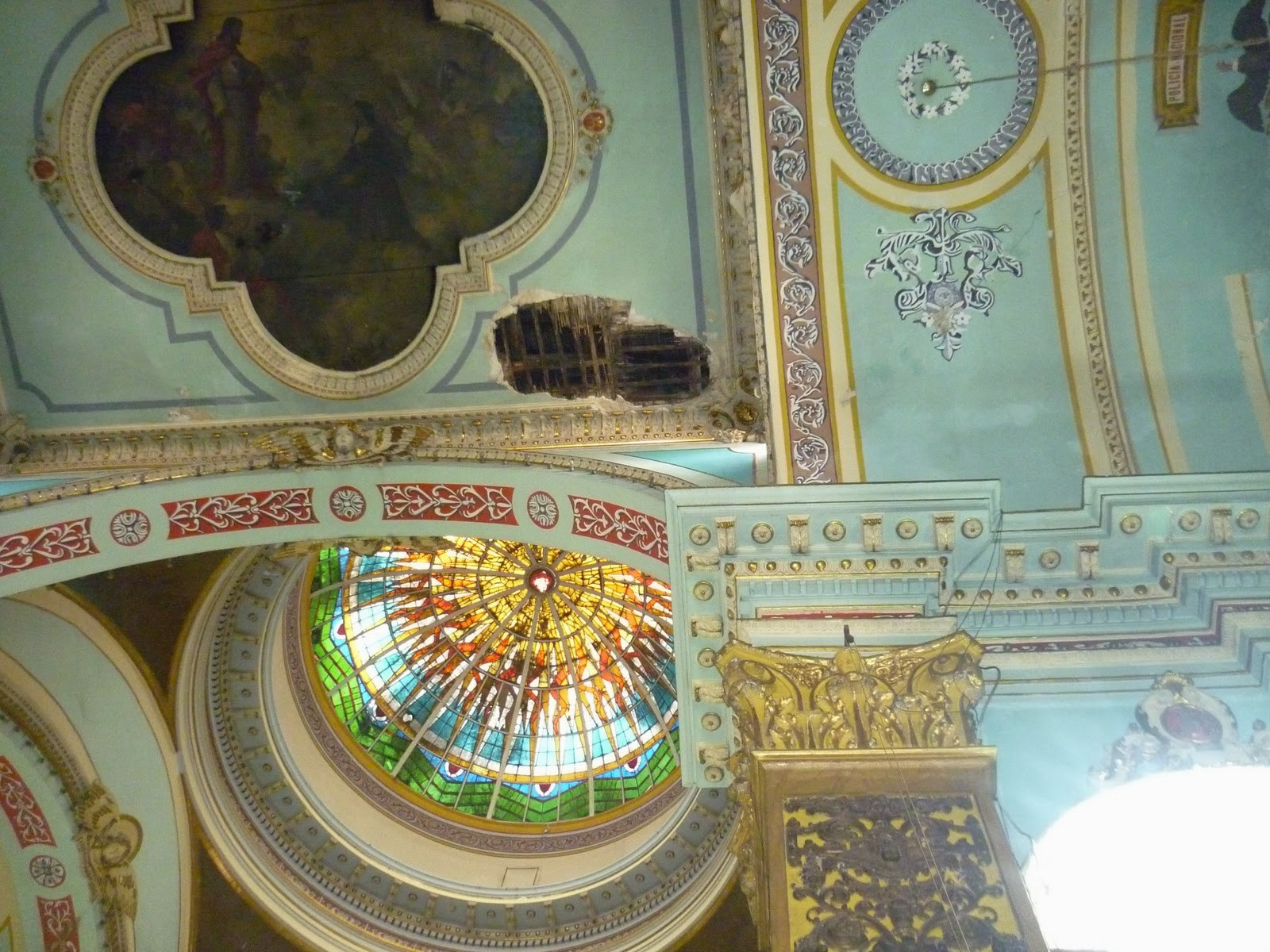

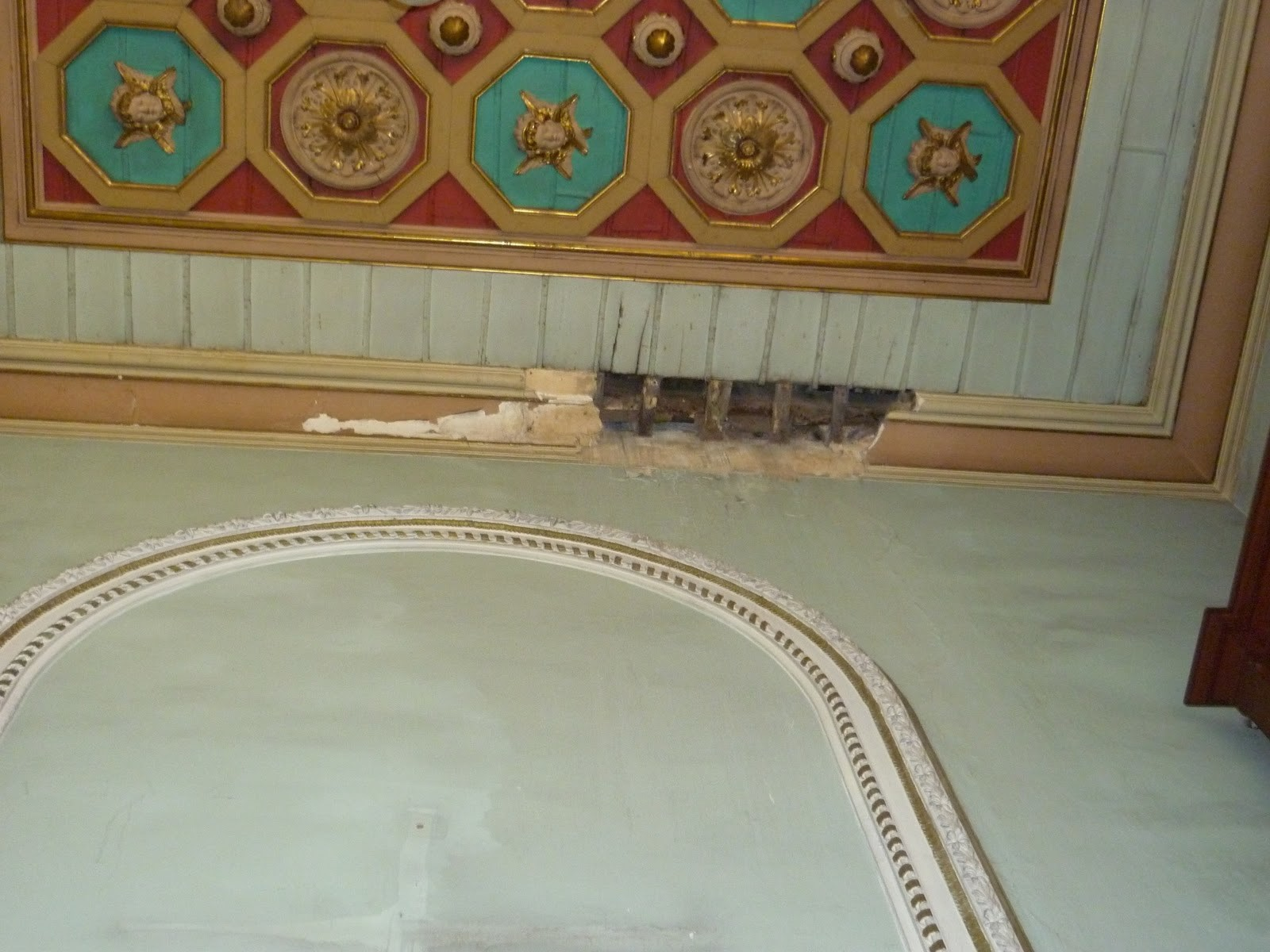

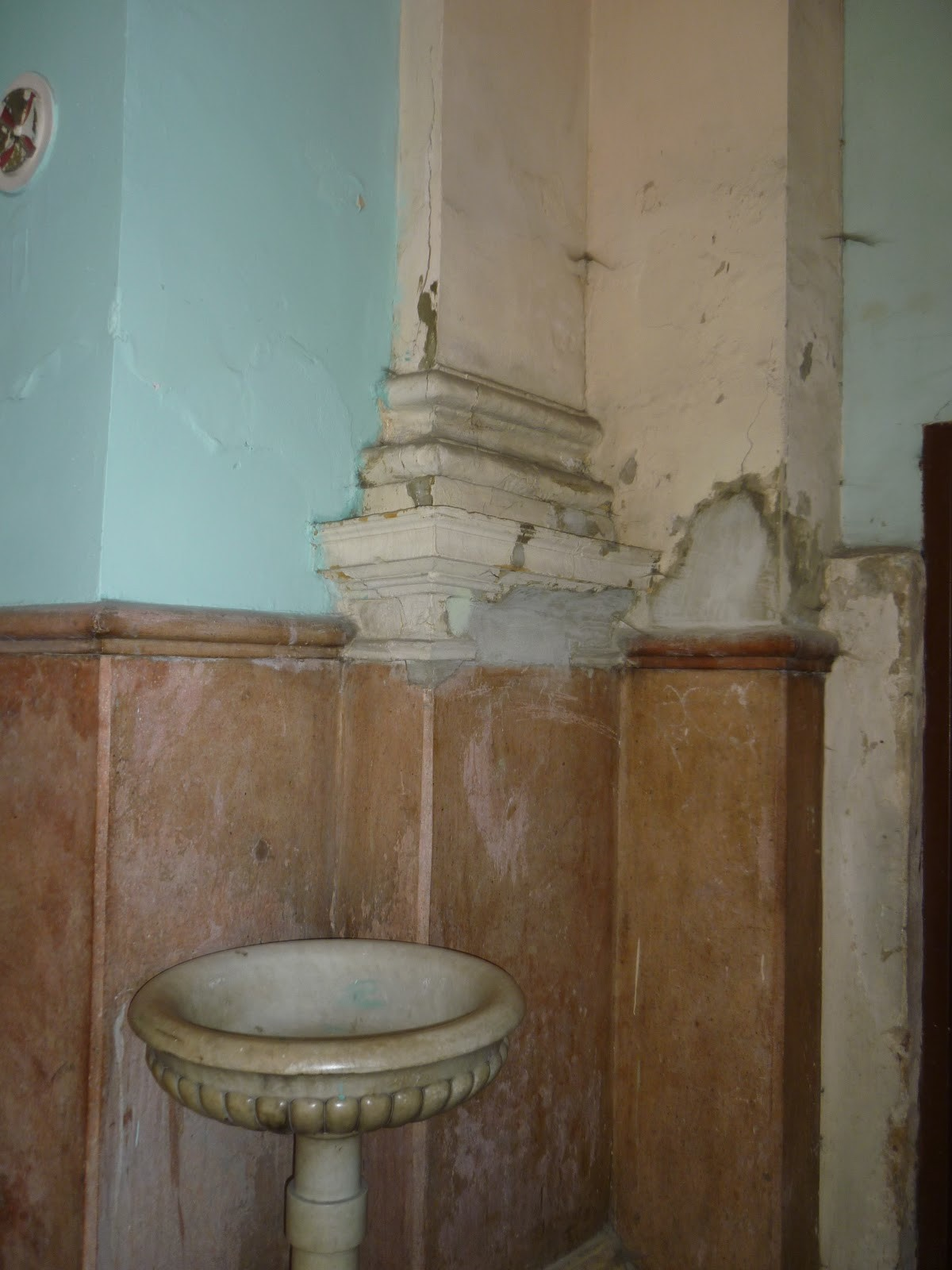

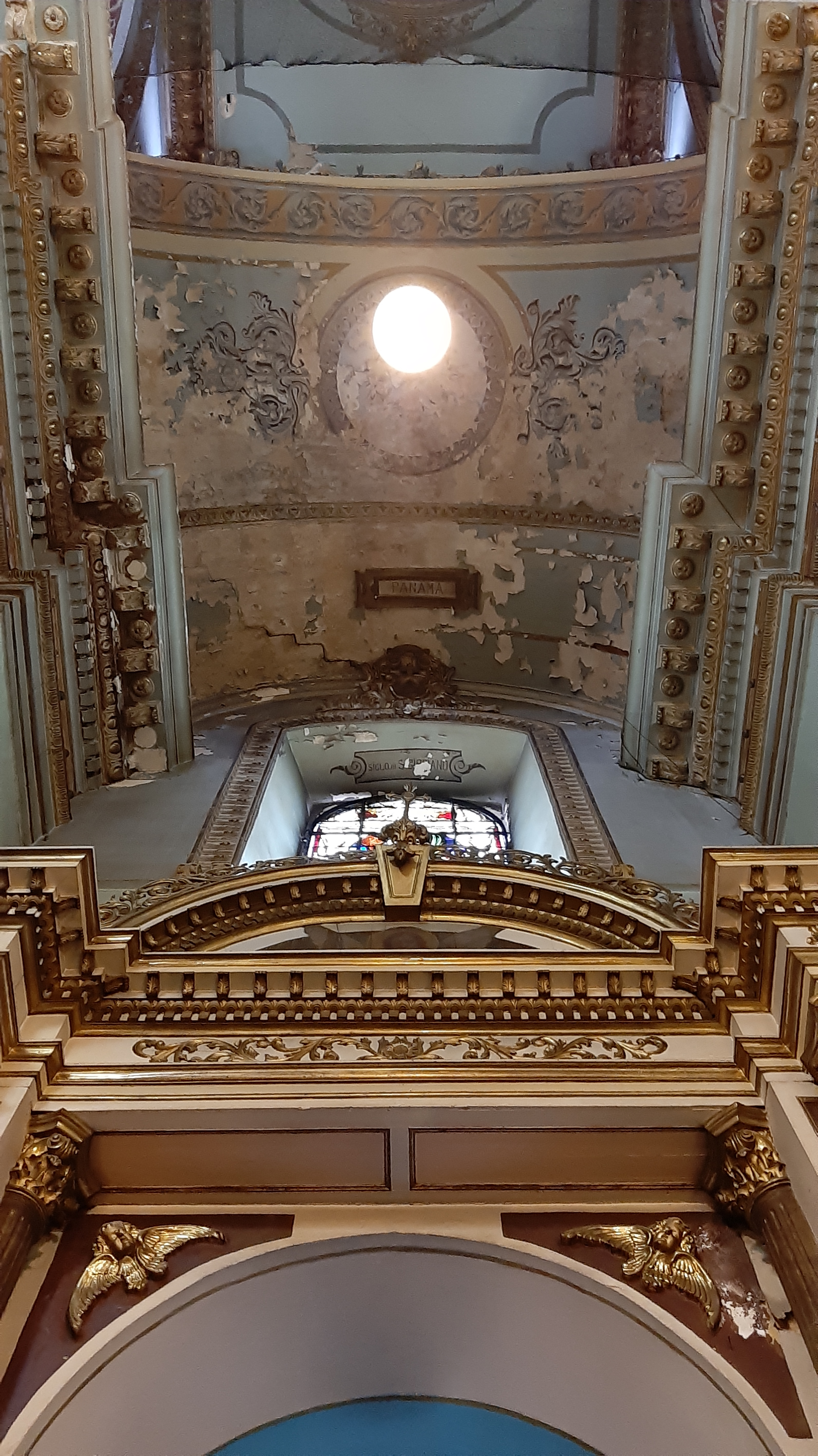

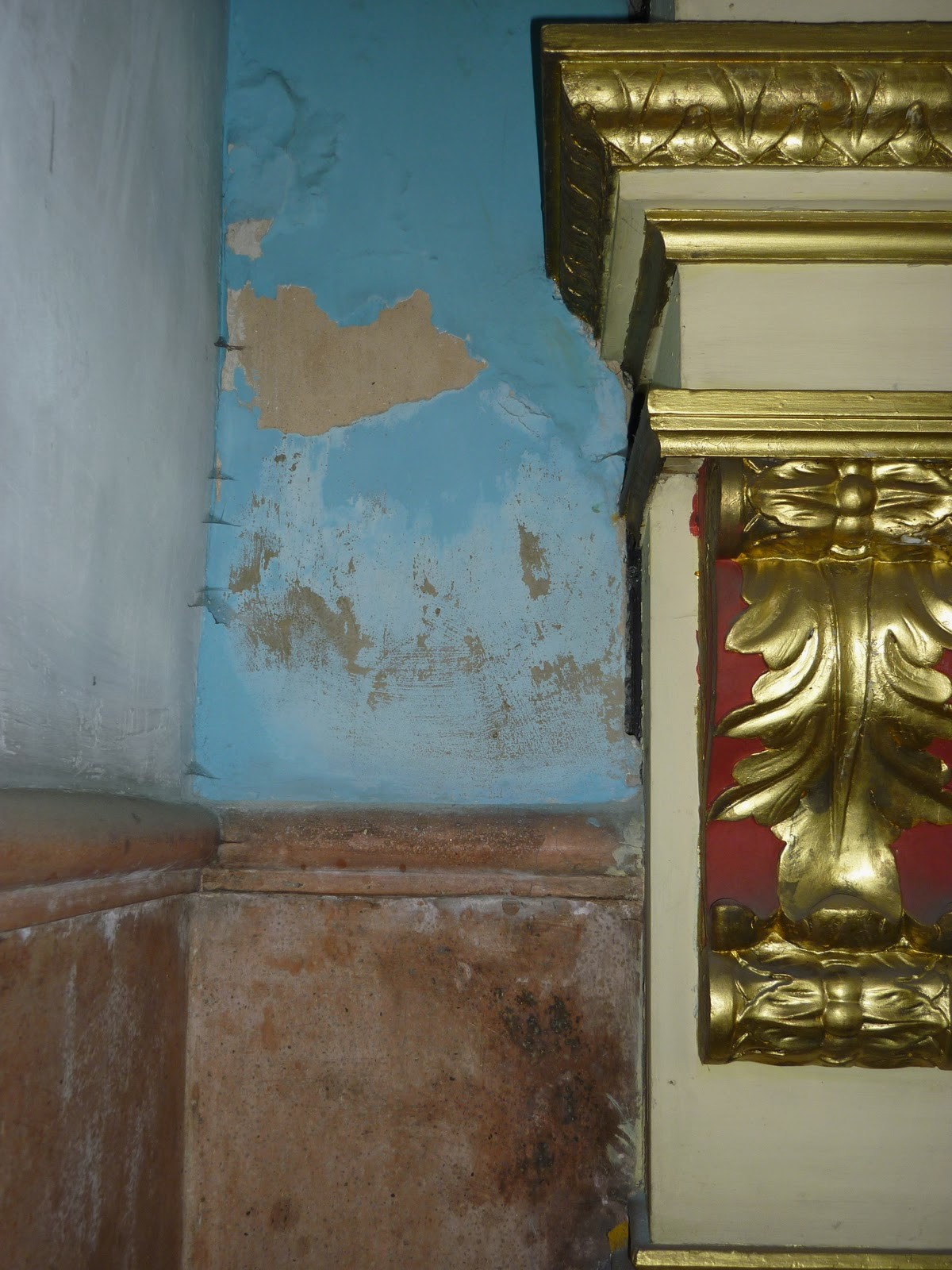

In response to the basilica's deterioration, restoration and heritage protection efforts were initiated in the 2000s, including requests for its recognition as a Property of Cultural Interest to ensure its preservation.

=== 2012–present. The resurgence ===
Restoration of the Basilica of the Voto Nacional began in the early 2010s through a combination of public and international donations, including contributions from German and Italian organizations. Initial interventions addressed urgent structural risks, including stabilization of the roof, electrical system replacement, and conservation studies. In this context, the Ministry of Culture declared the basilica a National Property of Cultural Interest (BIC) in 2012.

In 2011, the National University of Colombia prepared the Special Management and Protection Plan for the Historic Center (PEMP), approved in 2013 by the District Institute of Cultural Heritage of Bogotá (IDPC). A comprehensive restoration project was subsequently designed and approved by the Ministry of Culture in 2015. Emergency works were carried out between 2014 and 2015 to address severe structural and sanitary issues, including water infiltration in the crypts, deterioration of sculptures, and façade instability.

Measures included drainage improvements, sanitation of underground areas, façade consolidation, and removal and replacement of at-risk sculptural elements, notably a replica of the statue of Saint Peter Claver. Protective systems were also installed inside the nave and on the façade to prevent falling debris and control pigeon damage.

Based on technical assessments, the intervention was divided into three phases. The first phase (2016–2017) focused on the restoration of the main façade, which showed significant structural tilt, as well as stabilization of decorative elements, restoration of the clock tower, and recovery of interior lighting openings.

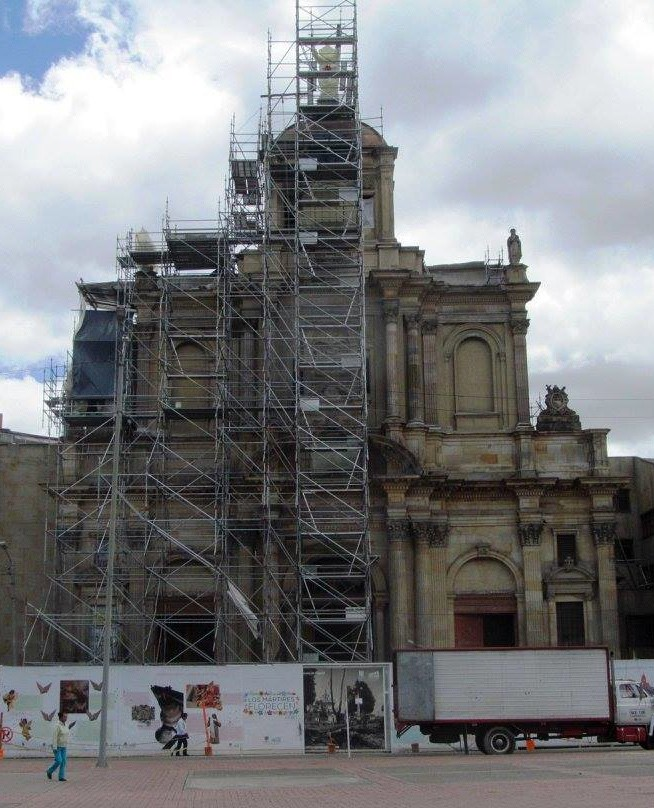
Left. The façade in the process of restoration.

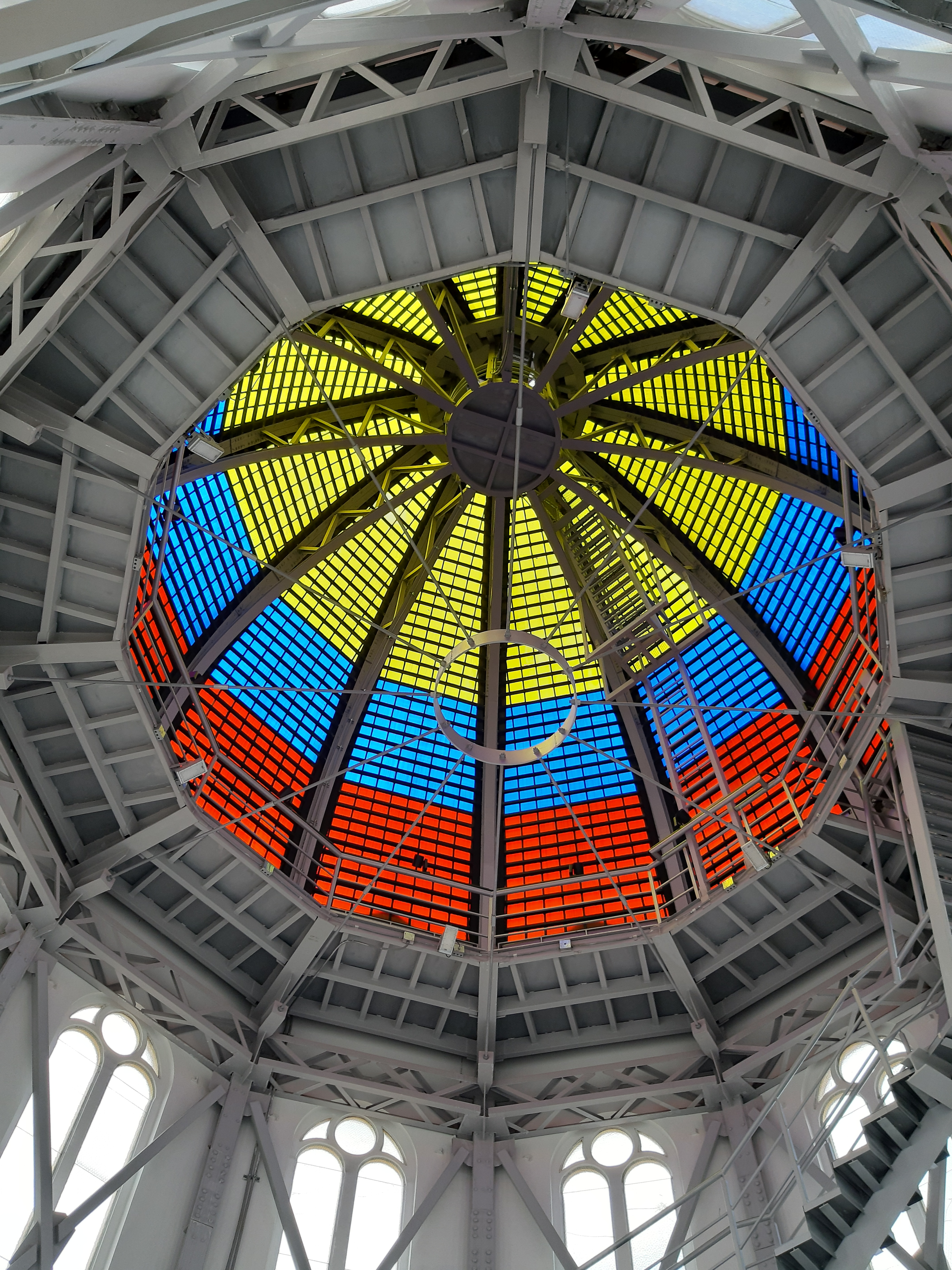
Center. Interior of the restored exterior dome with colored glass in the colors of the Colombian flag. Most of the original glass was lost; the current ones are laminated with a textured finish.

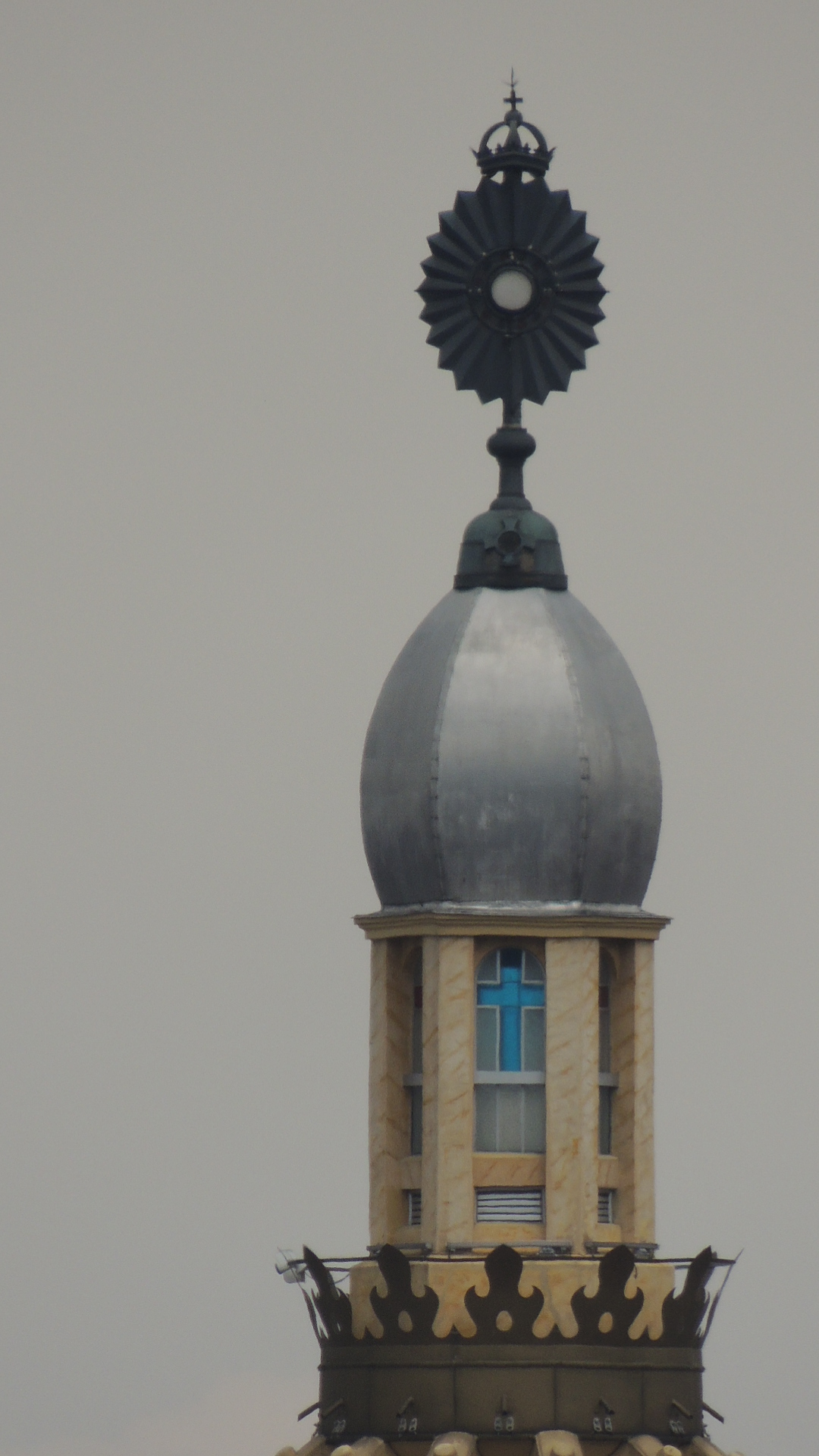
Right. Detail of the lantern and the large monstrance of the dome after restoration.

Sculptures on the façade were dismantled, restored, and reinstalled in workshops within the church. This phase also included treatment of humidity issues and structural reinforcement works, with an investment of approximately 3.14 billion pesos. (Note: In 2017, the average dollar to Colombian peso exchange rate was 2,951.32)

The second phase (2018–2020) addressed the presbytery, transept, and dome. Structural reinforcement of foundations, walls, and columns required archaeological work in the crypt, including the exhumation and reinterment of 789 ossuaries under forensic supervision. Restoration also included stained glass windows, interior decoration, and full rehabilitation of the dome, including removal and conservation of the tricolor glass system. This phase involved an investment of approximately 10.59 billion pesos. (Note: In 2019, the average dollar to Colombian peso exchange rate was 3,281.09)

The third phase, planned for the central nave and side chapels, was delayed due to the COVID-19 pandemic and remains pending. It is expected to require further phased investment due to its scale and cost. (Note: In 2020, the average dollar to Colombian peso exchange rate was 3,684.95)

In 2025, the Office of the Inspector General of the Nation reported continued deterioration of artistic and structural elements, including damage to ceilings, paintings, and roofing systems. The report requested updated information from cultural authorities on the progress of restoration and emphasized the need for continued conservation measures to prevent further degradation of the monument.

== Authorship of the temple ==
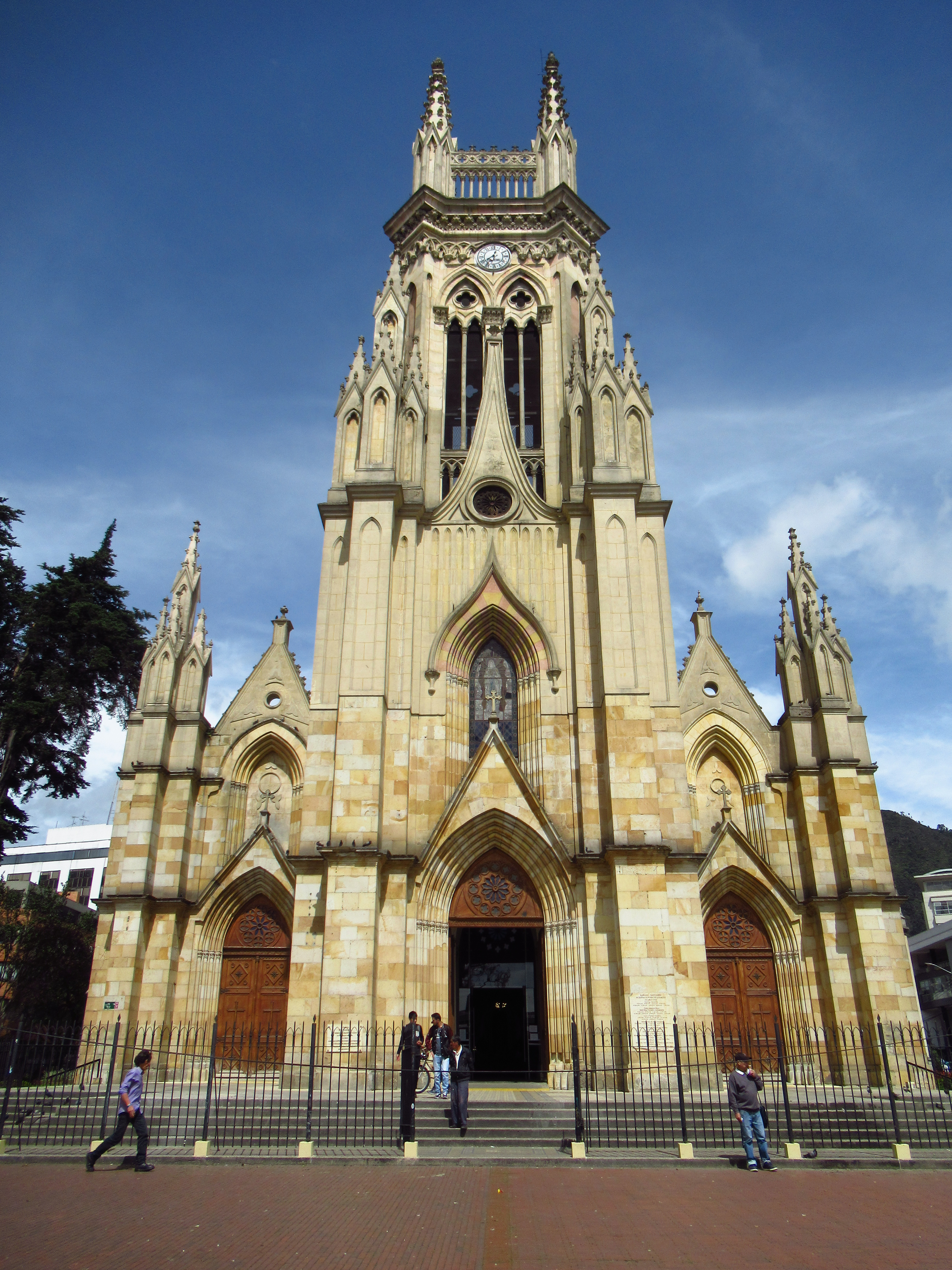
Basilica of Our Lady of Lourdes, work of Lombana, in Bogotá.

The memoirs of the Claretians attribute the initial designs of the chapel promoted by Doña Rosa around 1881 to Francisco Olaya, who at the time was also her neighbor. However, the same memoirs indicate that the structure he built underwent several modifications, causing his intervention to disappear almost entirely.

The first documented reference to Julián Lombana's involvement dates to 1900, when he requested in a letter to the Central Board that the church be enlarged. Later testimonies suggest that the original project underwent repeated alterations during this early phase. In 1912, Fr. Antonio María Pueyo de Val wrote that “they've changed the plan several times, having altered it in pejus (for the worse)", while Fr. José Payás recalled in 1941 that by 1914 “the shed, the last remnant of the previous hermitage, had disappeared”, indicating that little remained of the earlier chapel.

Because no planimetric documents from Lombana's period survive, his precise authorship has been questioned.[6] Nevertheless, Alfredo Ortega Díaz, in Arquitectura en Bogotá (1924), listed the Voto Nacional temple among Lombana's works.

The project changed significantly after the arrival of Fr. Pueyo de Val in 1912. According to Claretian memoirs, Pueyo modified both the nave and façade designs with the authorization of Archbishop Herrera. Carlos Mesa later stated that Pueyo had effectively redrawn the plans of the frontispiece and interior, widening the spans, raising the vaults, and reorganizing the decorative program.

Fr. Martín Jové similarly wrote in 1943 that Pueyo “opened the solid walls that previously formed a kind of chapel and gave the temple that aspect of three naves it now has”. The same source states that Pueyo rejected one of the existing façade projects and conveyed his ideas to the painter Ricardo Acevedo Bernal, who produced the design ultimately executed. No surviving drawings clarify the respective contributions of Lombana and Pueyo.

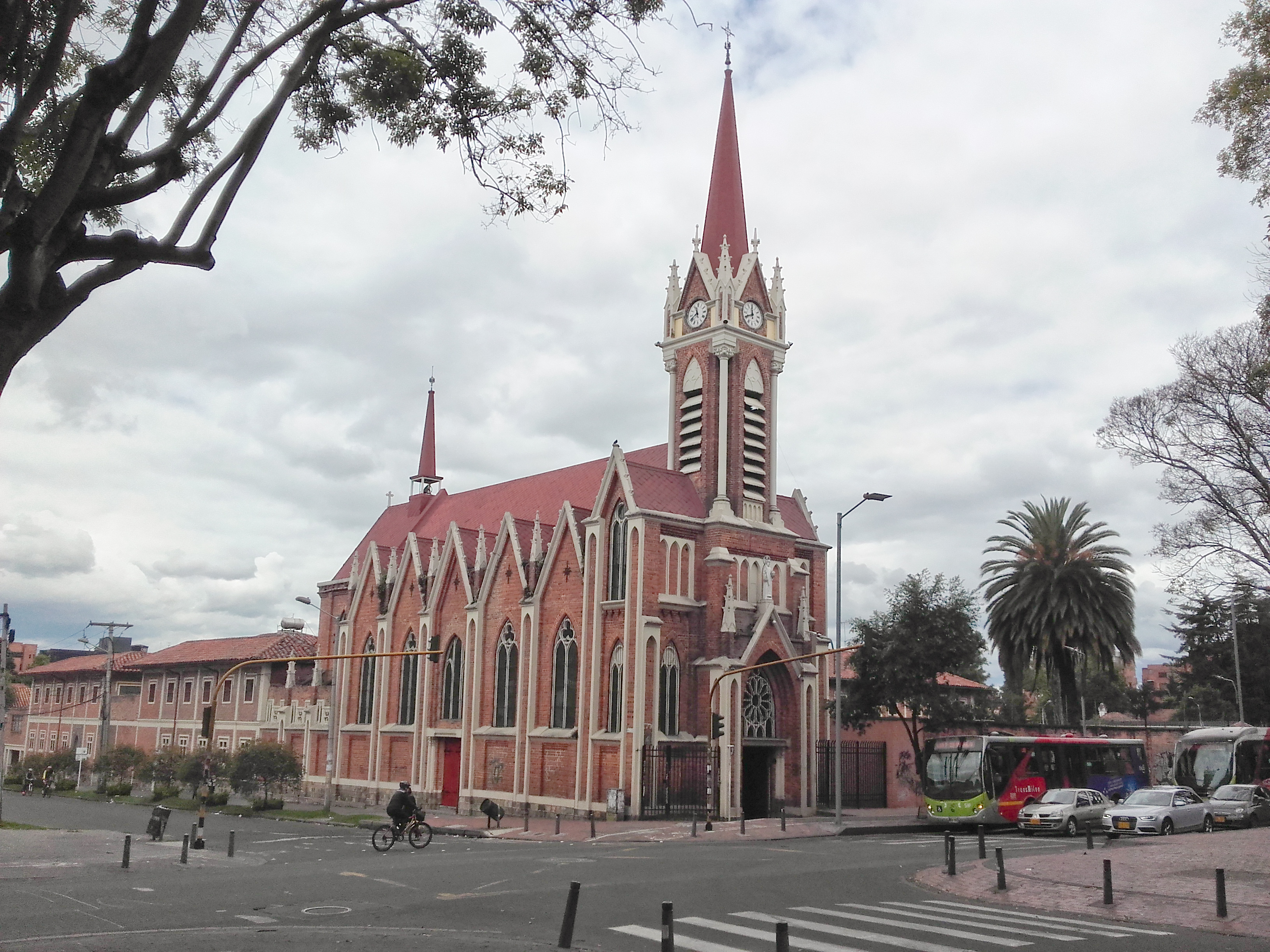
Cristo Rey church of the monastery of the Sisters of the Visitation, work of Antonio Stoute, in Bogotá.

As far as can be established, Lombana worked on the original property donated in 1892, together with the small adjoining parcels later acquired for the façade, which was completed in 1913. When Pueyo arrived in Bogotá in late 1912, he reported that the church still lacked roofing over its final third and that “the façade is halfway through the cornice of the first body”.

The western lands that now contain the transept and dome had not yet been acquired during Lombana's intervention. The church consecrated in 1916 still used the western edge of Rosa Calvo's original property as the presbytery. Later expansion works were designed by the Dutch architect Antonio Stoute, whose undated plans preserved in the Bogotá Archive show the projected transept, dome, and auxiliary spaces.

Permit documents related to the dome's construction in 1936 further confirm his role in the enlargement project. Consequently, Julián Lombana and Fr. Antonio Pueyo de Val are generally regarded as co-authors of the church consecrated in 1916, while Antonio Stoute is considered the author of the later enlargement inaugurated in 1938, including the transept, dome, and crypt.

== Urban and social context ==
Current urban environment of the Basilica of the Voto Nacional (red) and the Bogotá Cathedral (orange) in the city center. The area covered with diagonal lines comprises the former Bronx sector, currently the new headquarters of the Los Mártires Local Mayor's Office and other public buildings are being built on that site. The large green rectangle is the Tercer Milenio Park built in the former El Cartucho area. In yellow are other Catholic temples in the area.

The basilica is located on the western side of the Plaza de Los Mártires, in the Voto Nacional neighborhood of the Los Mártires locality of the city of Bogotá. The square, an important historical and symbolic site in the city, contains the Monument to the Martyrs, a 17-meter obelisk commemorating the martyrs of Colombian independence. The importance of the square later gave its name to the present-day locality of Los Mártires.

From the 1930s onward, the construction of Avenida Caracas transformed the area significantly. Its route through Plaza de Los Mártires divided the square in two, led to the demolition of part of the School of Medicine building and numerous houses, and disrupted the urban continuity between the historic center and the Voto Nacional sector. (Note: At the beginning of the 20th century, construction began on the building of the School of Medicine of the National University, which was partially inaugurated in 1918, although not completed until the 1930s. From the 1930s, work began to open Avenida Caracas through the city of Bogotá from north to south. Around 1948, the progress of the construction of said avenue through the Plaza de Los Mártires sector required several demolitions, including a significant reduction of said square and the drastic demolition of part of the School of Medicine building. The pavilions on the east side were completely demolished to make way for the road project. In 1953, the Central Mortgage Bank returned the old building of the Faculty of Medicine (National School of Medicine) to the Nation, as the university moved to the campus on Calle 26. From 1954, the building was occupied by the Brigade of Military Institutes of the Army and, later, by the Presidential Guard Battalion, which remained there until the 1990s. Later it was the headquarters of the Recruiting Battalion.: Fonseca, Sebastián (6 March 2025). «¡La arqueología urbana del Proyecto Metropolitano Bronx Distrito Creativo! - Sección: El BDC, testigo de la historia de Bogotá ». Bronx Distrito Creativo. Retrieved 10 June 2025.) The square's gardens were removed and the area was later adapted for vehicular traffic and bus stops.

The sector deteriorated further after the riots of 9 April 1948, which caused extensive violence and destruction. The relocation of the market to nearby Plaza España in 1956 accelerated the departure of traditional residents and the growth of crime. Many former residences were converted into tenements, hotels, warehouses, and commercial premises. In 1967, the widening of Avenida Caracas from two to four lanes increased vehicular traffic and reinforced the area's isolation from the historic center.

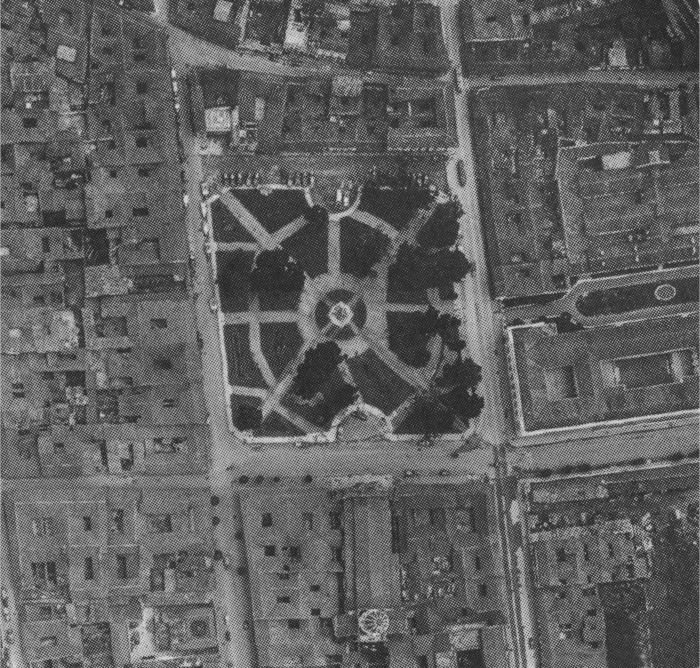
Parque de Los Mártires in 1943

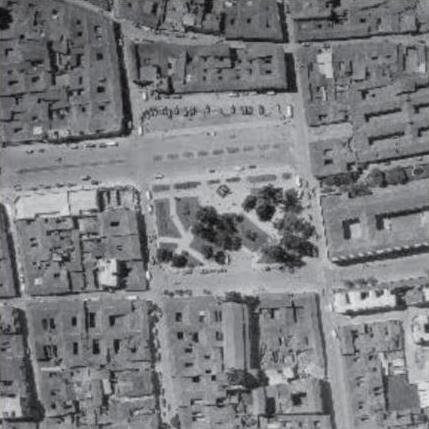
Plaza de Los Mártires in 1948

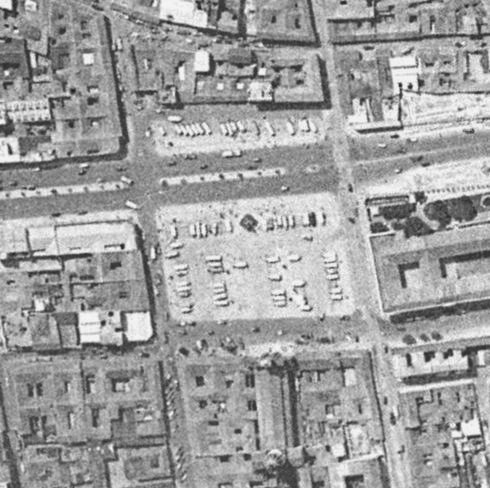
Plaza de Los Mártires in 1952

The aerial photographs show the Plaza de Los Mártires when it was a park and how the advance of Avenida Caracas divided it into two parts, also eliminated the vegetation and it was turned into a bus stop. All this only contributed to the increasing deterioration of the area around the Temple.

By the late 20th century, the nearby sectors known as El Cartucho and El Bronx had become major centers of crime, drug trafficking, prostitution, and homelessness. In 2000, authorities intervened in El Cartucho and replaced it with Parque Tercer Milenio, which displaced much of the criminal activity toward El Bronx. On 28 May 2016, El Bronx was intervened by more than 2,500 members of the National Police and Army, initiating a broader urban renewal process in the sector. As part of this renewal, Plaza de Los Mártires and the basilica underwent restoration works. The square and obelisk were restored by 2016, while the first and second stages of restoration of the basilica were carried out between 2016–2017 and 2018–2020 respectively.

The district government, through the Empresa de Renovación y Desarrollo Urbano de Bogotá (RenoBo), is currently implementing the Voto Nacional–La Estanzuela Partial Plan, which includes the Bronx Distrito Creativo, the Centro de Talento Creativo Multicampus, and the new administrative headquarters of the Los Mártires Local Mayor's Office.

Current land use in the Voto Nacional neighborhood is predominantly commercial, followed by residential and institutional uses. Commercial activity includes hardware stores, agro-industrial businesses, textile trade, household goods, and informal street vending.

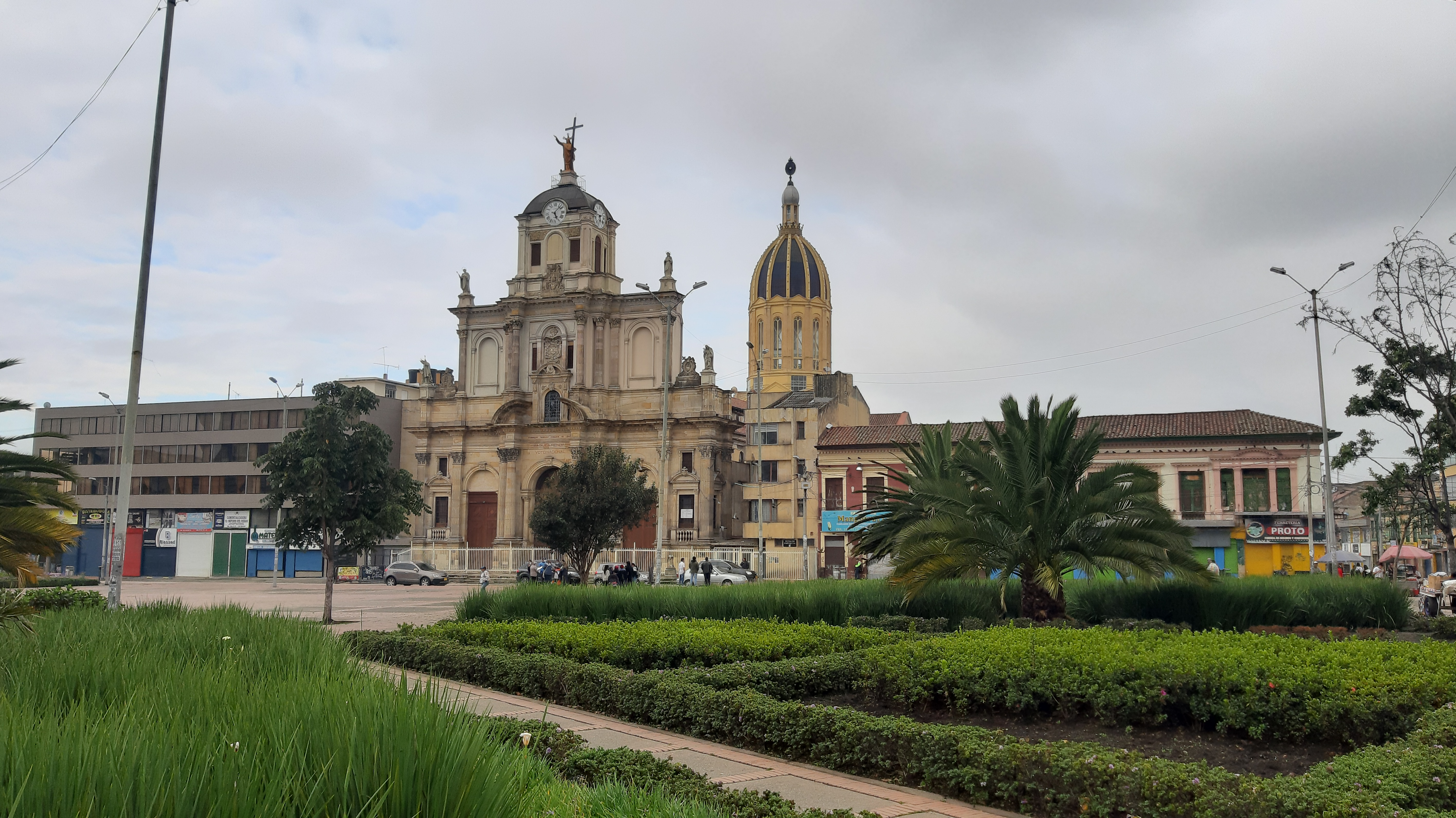
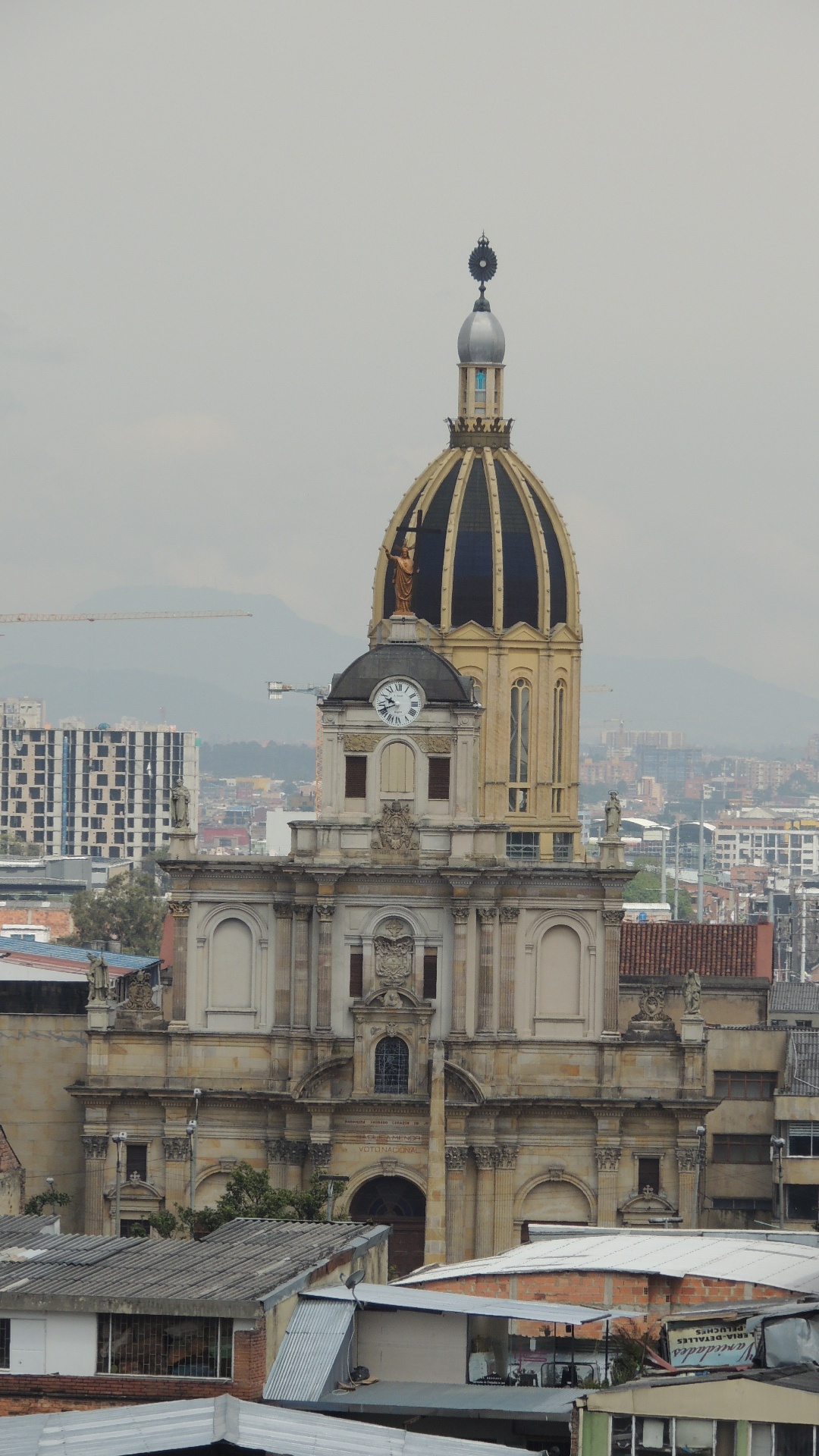
Left. Panoramic view of the western side of the Plaza de Los Mártires. From left to right: Filosofado building (main Claretian headquarters), Basilica of the Voto Nacional, Parish House, and old Republican houses. Right. Panoramic view of the Basilica of the Voto Nacional.

Much of the resident population is transient and lives in tenements due to the sector's low rental costs and proximity to work opportunities. The neighborhood also has a significant presence of the Otavalo indigenous community from Ecuador, which maintains close ties with the parish and participates actively in religious activities.

On the western side of the square are the Filosofado building, the Basilica of the Voto Nacional, the parish house, and several Republican-era residences later adapted for commercial and residential use. On the south side stands the former Faculty of Medicine building, designed by the French architect Gastón Lelarge between 1916 and 1930 and declared a National Property of Cultural Interest. The building is currently being adapted as part of the Bronx Distrito Creativo project.

The eastern side of the square is bordered by Avenida Caracas, now a TransMilenio corridor. At its northeastern corner is the Avenida Jiménez station. The future elevated first line of the Bogotá Metro will also include a station in the area, above the TransMilenio station, which has required the acquisition and demolition of several nearby properties.

== Building characteristics ==
The basilica was built in the Neo-baroque style, one of the styles of Historicist architecture that revived forms associated with earlier periods. The building consists of a single longitudinal nave with 16 side chapels and a transept. Their intersection forms the crossing, above which rises the dome, while to the west extends a shallow polygonal apse conditioned by the shape of the original lot. Together, these elements form a Latin cross plan.

The dome is composed of a double-shell system. The exterior dome rises on an elongated drum and is covered with glass in the colors of the Colombian flag, topped by a lantern crowned with a monstrance. Internally, the crossing is covered by a stained-glass dome representing a radiant sun.

The basilica measures 68.41 m in length and 20 m in width across the longitudinal nave and side chapels, widening to 27.44 m at the façade and 30 m at the transept. The façade reaches 38.60 m in height to the sculpture of Jesus, while the exterior dome rises to 53.80 m at the monstrance.

The main façade is composed of three tiers and five bays that decrease in width toward the top. The three central bays correspond to the nave and side chapels, while the outer bays project laterally as attached volumes. The tiers are separated by cornices, and the bays by half-pilasters and columns.

=== Materials and structure ===
The basilica is structured through a system of load-bearing walls that transfer the building's weight to the foundations and then to the ground. Its foundations are generally composed of cyclopean stone masonry joined with lime-and-sand mortar, although the system varies according to each sector of the building.

Detail of column foundation.

In the façade area, the foundation consists of a continuous cyclopean stone footing reaching a depth of 4 m below the atrium level. Inside the church, the foundations are shallower, reaching approximately 2.7 m, and combine stone and solid brick masonry. In the transept, the system incorporates concrete footings supporting the pillars beneath the dome.

The first body of the façade has walls averaging 2 m in thickness, built with mixed masonry of carved stone and solid brick, externally clad with 18 cm thick ashlar stone. The upper sections are constructed primarily of solid brick masonry with stone-like finishes, gradually decreasing in thickness. Internal vaults support the central pillar carrying the statue of Jesus.

Behind the façade is a timber-framed structure of the Pan de Bois type, containing mezzanines for the bells and clock mechanism. The upper section culminates in a wooden cupola with a brass roof surrounding the statue's supporting pillar. Within the façade's side walls are two circular ducts: the southern one contains a spiral stone staircase leading to the choir, while the northern duct houses the bell ropes.

The choir and antecoro are supported by 1 m thick mixed masonry walls connected to the façade volumes. The side walls of the nave and chapels are also built in mixed masonry of stone and solid brick, reinforced by relieving arches and buttressing transverse walls that support the barrel vaults of the side chapels and the diaphragm arches of the central nave.

The transept walls are load-bearing solid brick masonry approximately 45 cm thick and up to 20 m high. In the presbytery, the structure incorporates reinforced concrete pillars with railway beams and steel stirrups, supporting the cimborrio and the drum of the stained-glass dome.

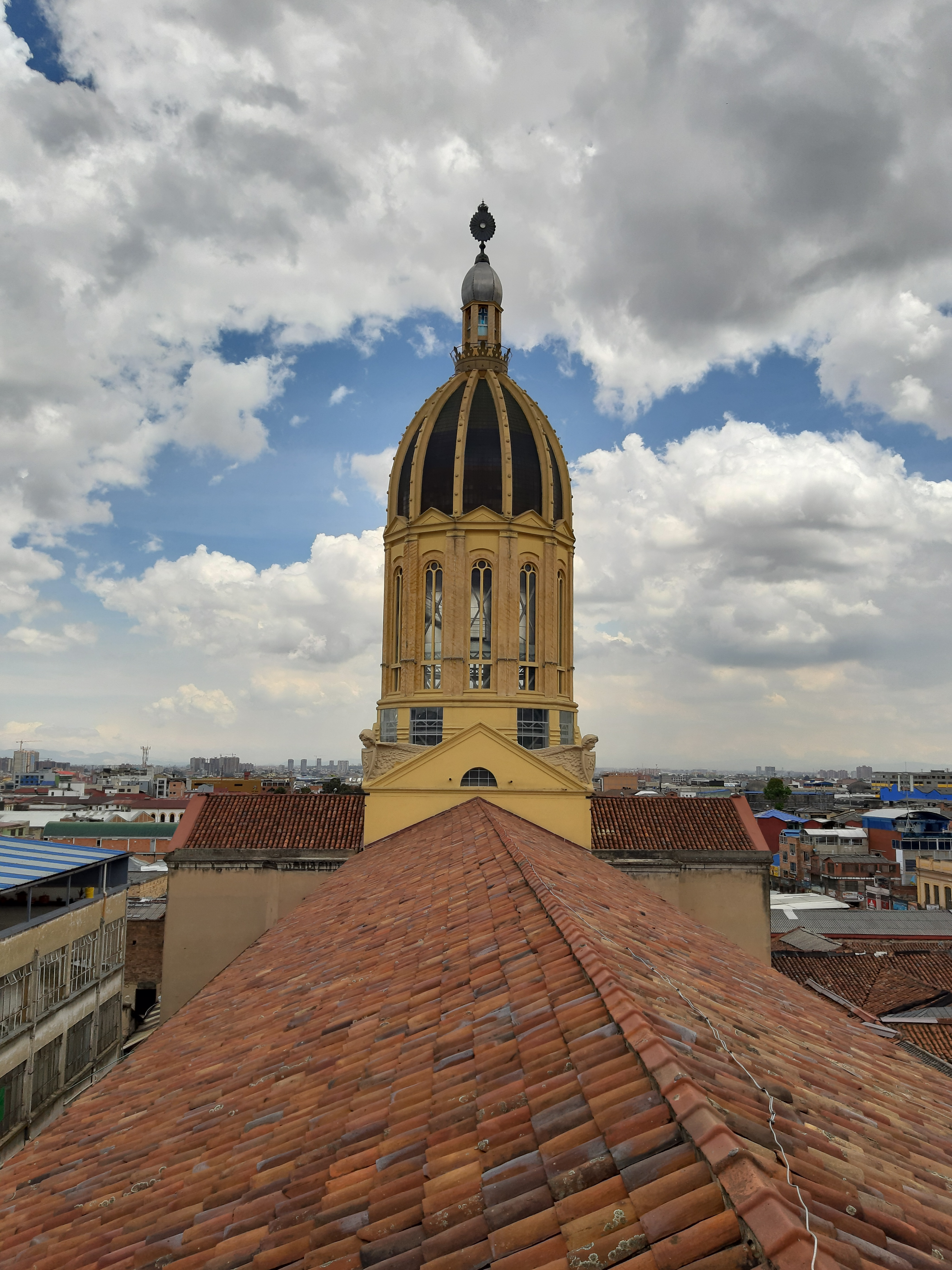
Left. View of the restored exterior dome; also visible is the terracotta tile roof of the longitudinal nave and transept, which are gabled.

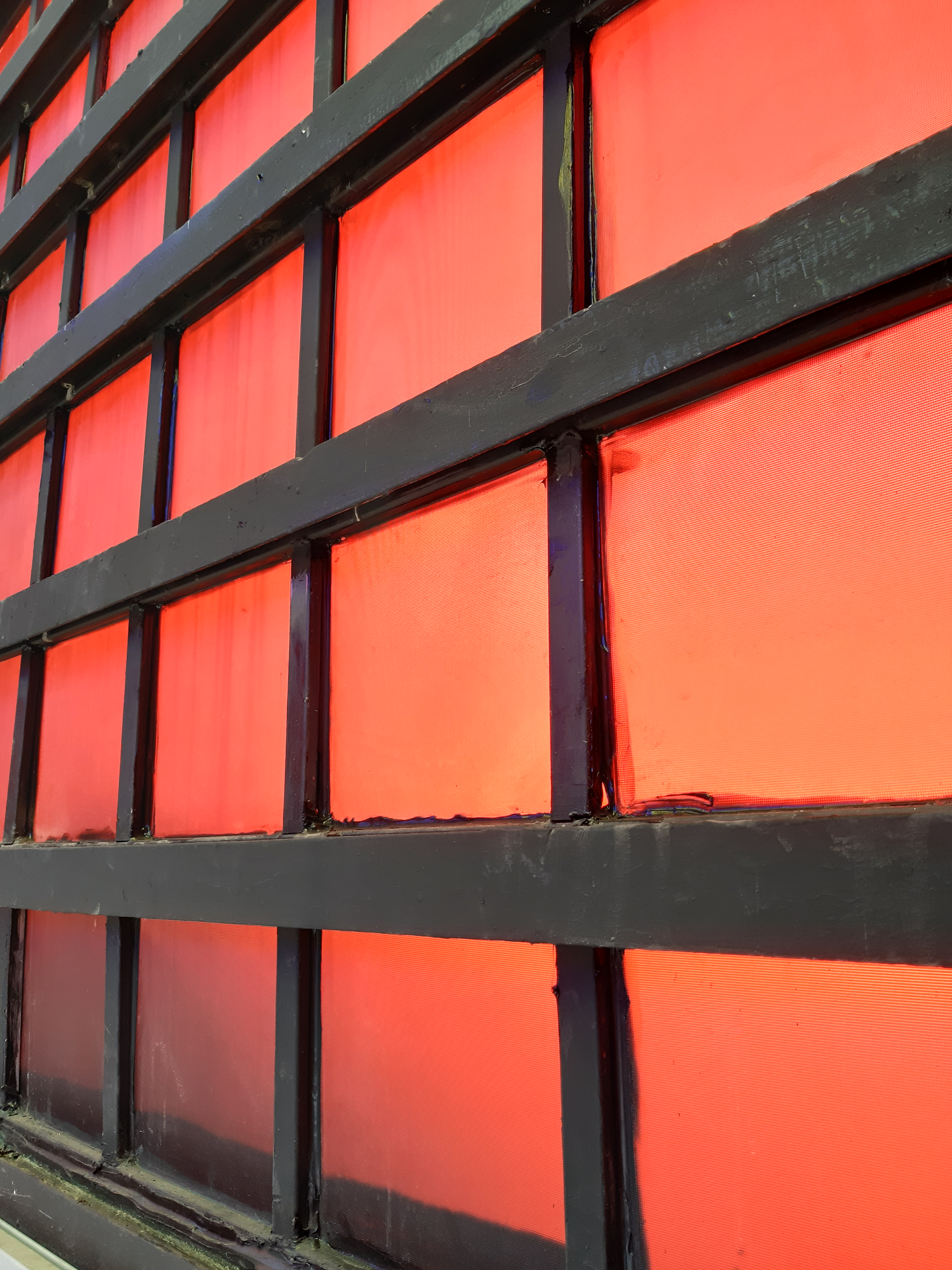
Right. Detail of the glass plates of the dome.

The exterior dome consists of a radial metal framework supported by an elongated drum resting on a concrete ring. (Note: Pañetar: Colombian usage. To plaster, to cover walls, ceilings, etc., of a building with plaster. Pañete: Layer or plaster coating of gypsum, stucco, cement, or other material, applied to walls, ceilings, etc., allowing them to be finished.) The longitudinal nave and transept are covered by gabled roofs, while the side chapels have shed roofs, all finished with terracotta tiles.

The roof structure is formed by timber king-post trusses and purlins; during restoration works in 2012, the original reed-and-mortar support system beneath the tiles was replaced with fiber cement panels. The ceilings of the nave are suspended from the roof structure by wooden frameworks and rods, while those of the transept are formed by cement shells over metal mesh. The presbytery floor is paved in white marble, whereas the nave and crypt floors are covered with pigmented hydraulic cement tiles measuring 20 × 20 cm.

=== Exterior ===
==== Façade ====
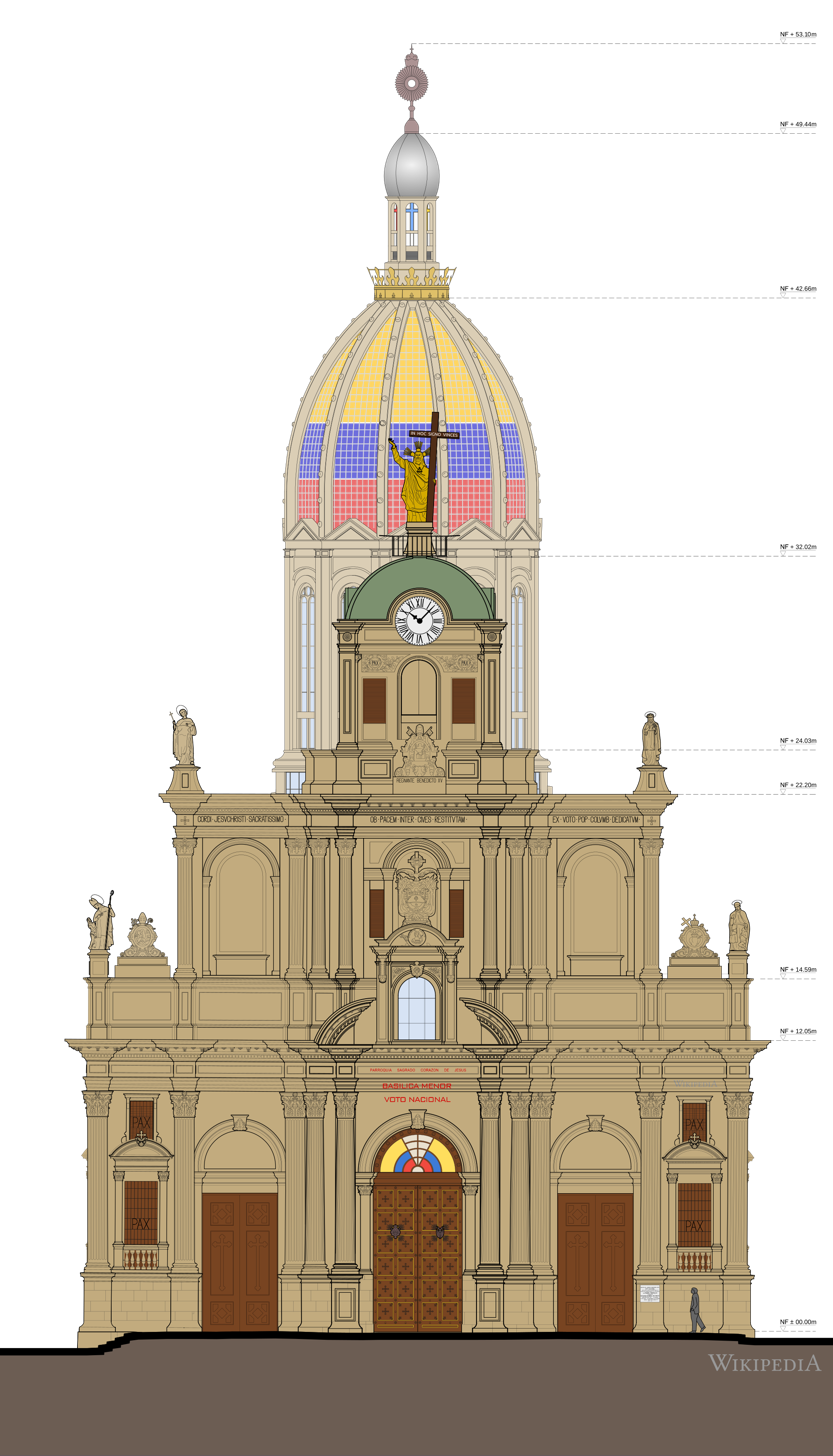
Elevation of the front or main façade with heights.

The main façade faces the western side of the Plaza de Los Mártires and is fully symmetrical. It is composed of three horizontal bodies separated by entablatures and five vertical bays divided by Corinthian columns and pilasters resting on smooth plinths. The shafts are fluted and topped with Corinthian capitals. As the façade rises, the bays progressively narrow, producing a stepped composition in the upper levels.

The first body is articulated in five bays and is largely open at its base through three main entrances and flanking windows. The structural system combines free-standing columns—placed in pairs near the central axis—and attached pilasters set against the wall. The free-standing columns support a broken curved pediment above the main portal and frame the central access, while the pilasters define the lateral portals and openings.

The second body is composed of three bays. The central bay contains a broken curved pediment typical of Baroque architecture, above which are the choir window, a medallion of Constantine Augustus, and the coat of arms of Colombia. This section is framed by four smaller Corinthian columns, while the side bays contain blind semicircular arches flanked by pilasters. At the ends of this level are the coat of arms of Archbishop Bernardo Herrera Restrepo and the statue of Saint Turibius to the south, and the emblem of the Claretians and the statue of Saint Peter Claver to the north.

The upper body functions as a bell tower with a rectangular plan and a single central bay framed by pilasters. At its extremities, above the second level, are the statues of Saint Louis Bertrand and Saint Rose of Lima. The upper section contains the coat of arms of Pope Benedict XV, a semicircular-arched opening through which the image of Jesus Christ appears, a clock face, and, at the summit, the statue of the Sacred Heart of Jesus.

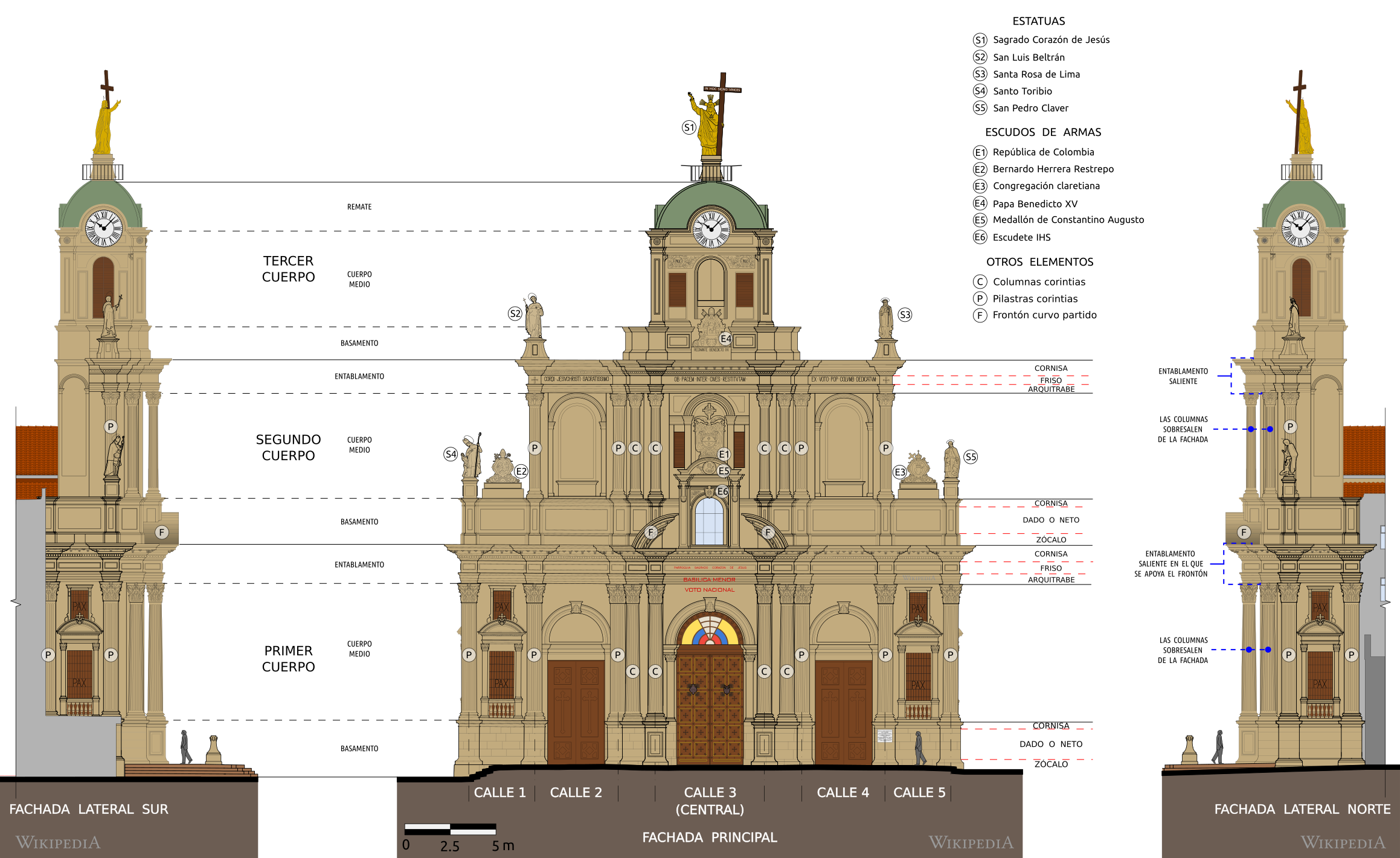
Elevation with its different parts and sections of the front façade and the side bodies of the façade.

=== Interior ===
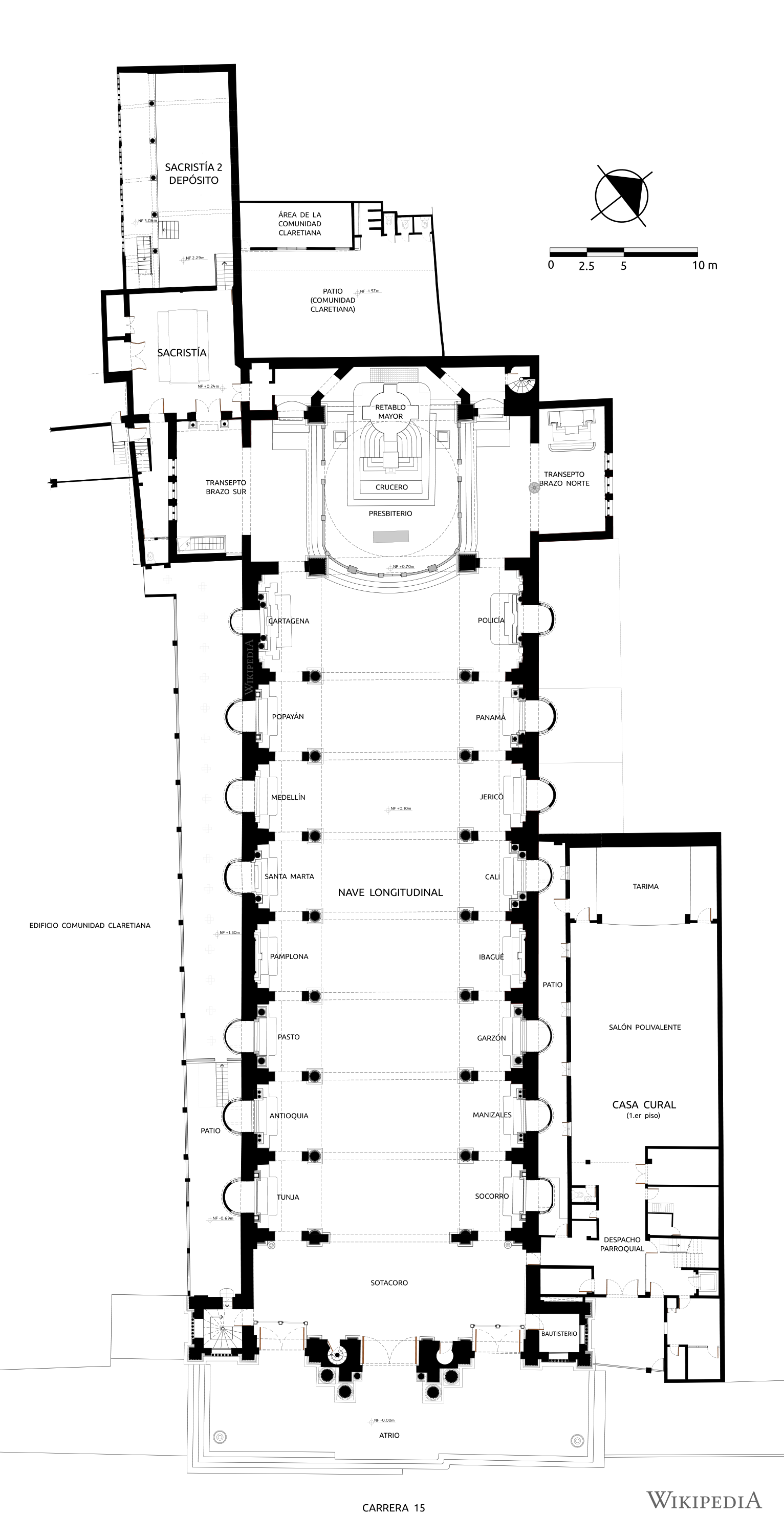
General plan of the Basilica and the parish house (1st floor in Colombia or ground floor in other countries).

Upon entering the temple through any of its three large doors, the first space encountered is the antecoro, located at the foot of the temple below the choir loft, which serves as a vestibule, a transition space to the other areas of the temple. The width of the antecoro coincides with the three central bays of the façade. Above the antecoro is the choir loft, where the pipe organ is located. After the antecoro is the longitudinal nave, which extends to the presbytery; above it is a series of diaphragm arches that rest on the transverse walls that define the space of the sixteen side chapels, eight on each side, distributed longitudinally. Between the ceiling located between the diaphragm arches are the eight large paintings by Maestro Ricardo Acevedo Bernal.

As already mentioned, each side chapel is clearly demarcated by the transverse walls; at the beginning of each wall is a column, which acts as a frame for each chapel. This column has a Corinthian capital and a smooth shaft, the latter having in its first third a ring-like molding on which a station of the cross is located. Of the sixteen chapels, fourteen of them have large niches that protrude from the wall to the exterior, allowing each to have windows within the niche. Around each niche, an altarpiece made of different materials is developed. The chapels communicate with each other through openings pierced in the walls dividing said chapels, giving the sensation of side aisles, which they really are not.

The final chapels (corresponding to Cartagena and the Police) are larger than the others, this is because originally the area between these chapels corresponded to the first presbytery the temple had when it was inaugurated in 1916.

Finally, we find the transept, which is the enlargement inaugurated in 1938 after acquiring some neighboring lands. The meeting between the transept and the longitudinal nave generates the crossing; to the west of this is a shallow apse, polygonal in shape; the crossing of these naves forms the Latin cross plan of the temple. The presbytery covers the area of the crossing and the shallow apse.

In the south arm of the transept, on the west wall of this, is the main entrance to the sacristy, and to the east are the stairs to go down to the ossuary crypt; and in the north arm, to the west, is the altarpiece where the image of Anthony Mary Claret is venerated.

The arms of the transept are unequal as they are conditioned by the shape of the lots that could be acquired for the enlargement, as unfortunately the necessary ones for the initially planned project could not be obtained. Even so, this inequality is almost unnoticeable inside, as the architect Antonio Stoute played with the internal perspective so that the viewer would not easily notice said inequality. (Note: In the official planimetry of the temple, it can be seen how the arms of the transept are not aligned with each other; they are unequal; instead, in the plan of the original project that was initially planned, the arms can be seen perfectly aligned and equal, but unfortunately not all the neighboring properties required could be acquired, so architect Stoute had to adapt the project to the fragments obtained.)

The general floor plan of the Basilica covers 1,238 m^{2} (not including the sacristy, ossuary crypt, and parish house). The capitals, the Stations of the Cross, the entablature, the moldings, and other ornamentation pieces inside the temple were made by the ornamentist and sculptor Colombo Ramelli, of the Ramelli workshop.

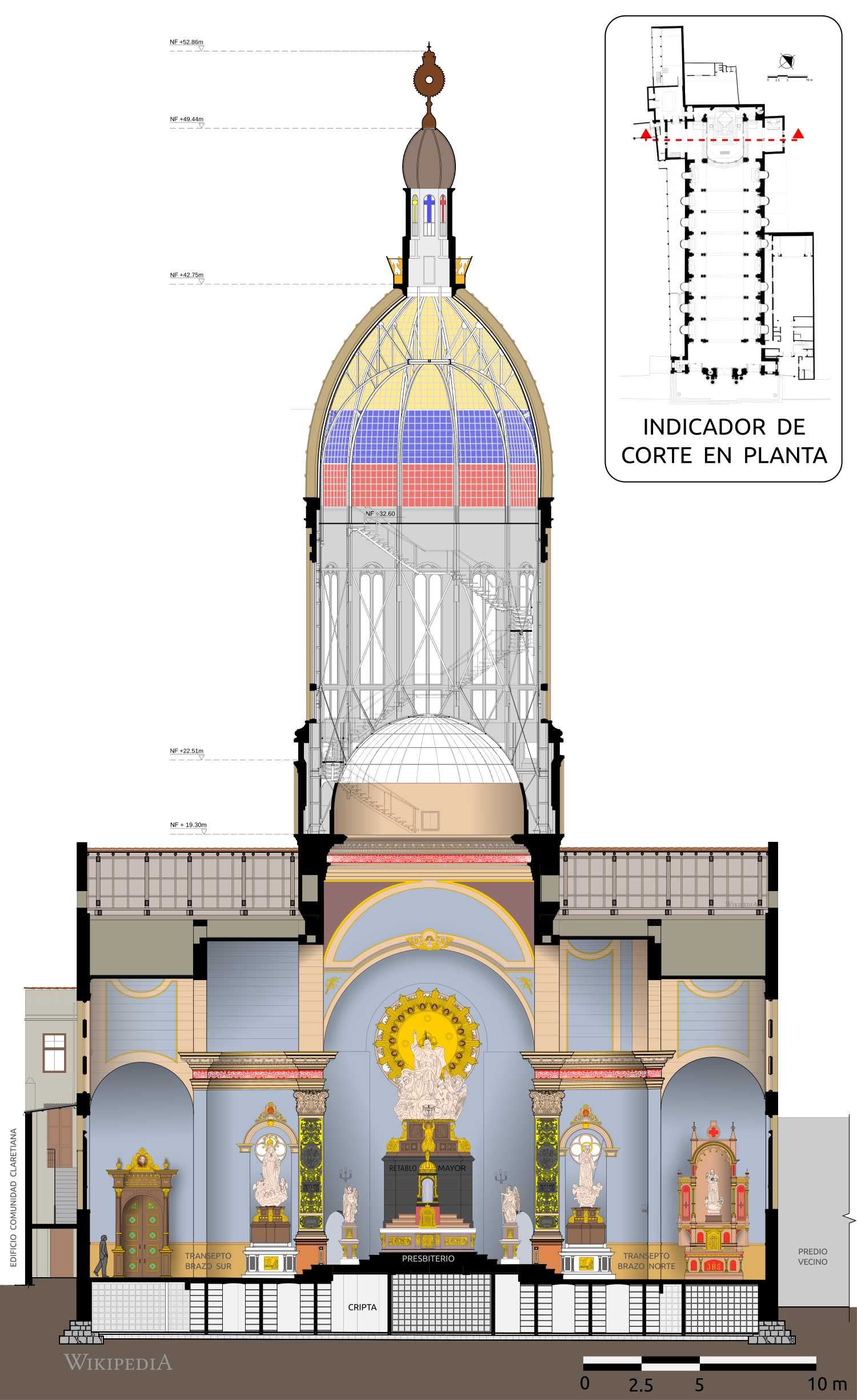
Left. Cross-section through the transept of the Basilica with a view towards the head.

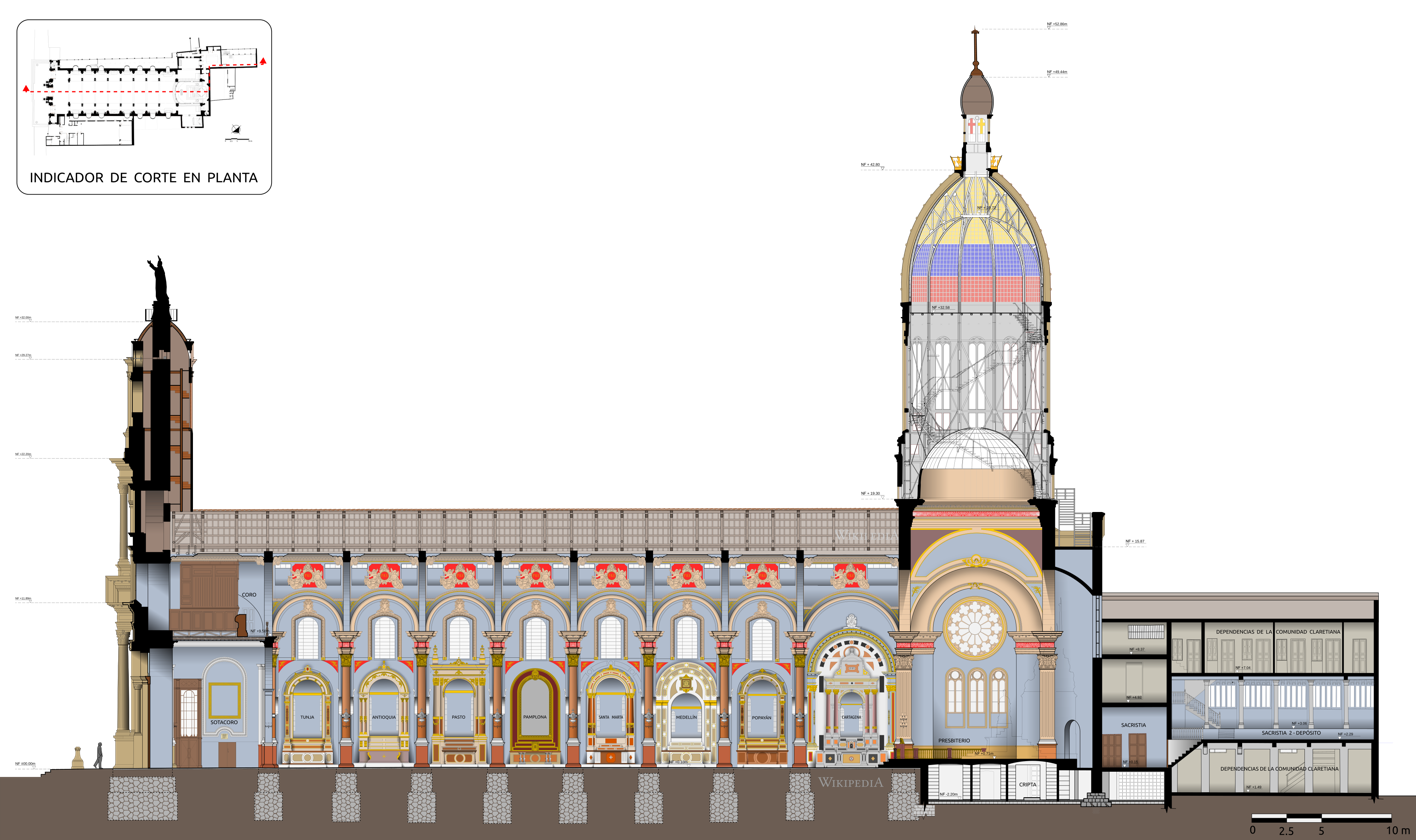
Right. Longitudinal section with a view towards the south of the Basilica and the block where the sacristy is located.

==== Presbytery ====
The presbytery of the temple has changed location twice, and the main altar with its altarpiece has changed three times. The first presbytery the temple had was the area located between the chapels of the National Police and Cartagena, i.e., the western end of the property donated by Mrs. Rosa Calvo. In that presbytery was located the first altar and main altarpiece with which the temple was consecrated and inaugurated in 1916. It must be taken into account that the altar was attached to the altarpiece, so they were part of the same structure; this is because before the Second Vatican Council, Mass was celebrated by the priest with his back to the congregation.

Fr. José Payás briefly describes this first altarpiece:

«... (in 1916) only on the back wall a simple golden wooden arch stood out sheltering the current image of the Sacred Heart, preserved today (1941) in the nativity altar ...»

—

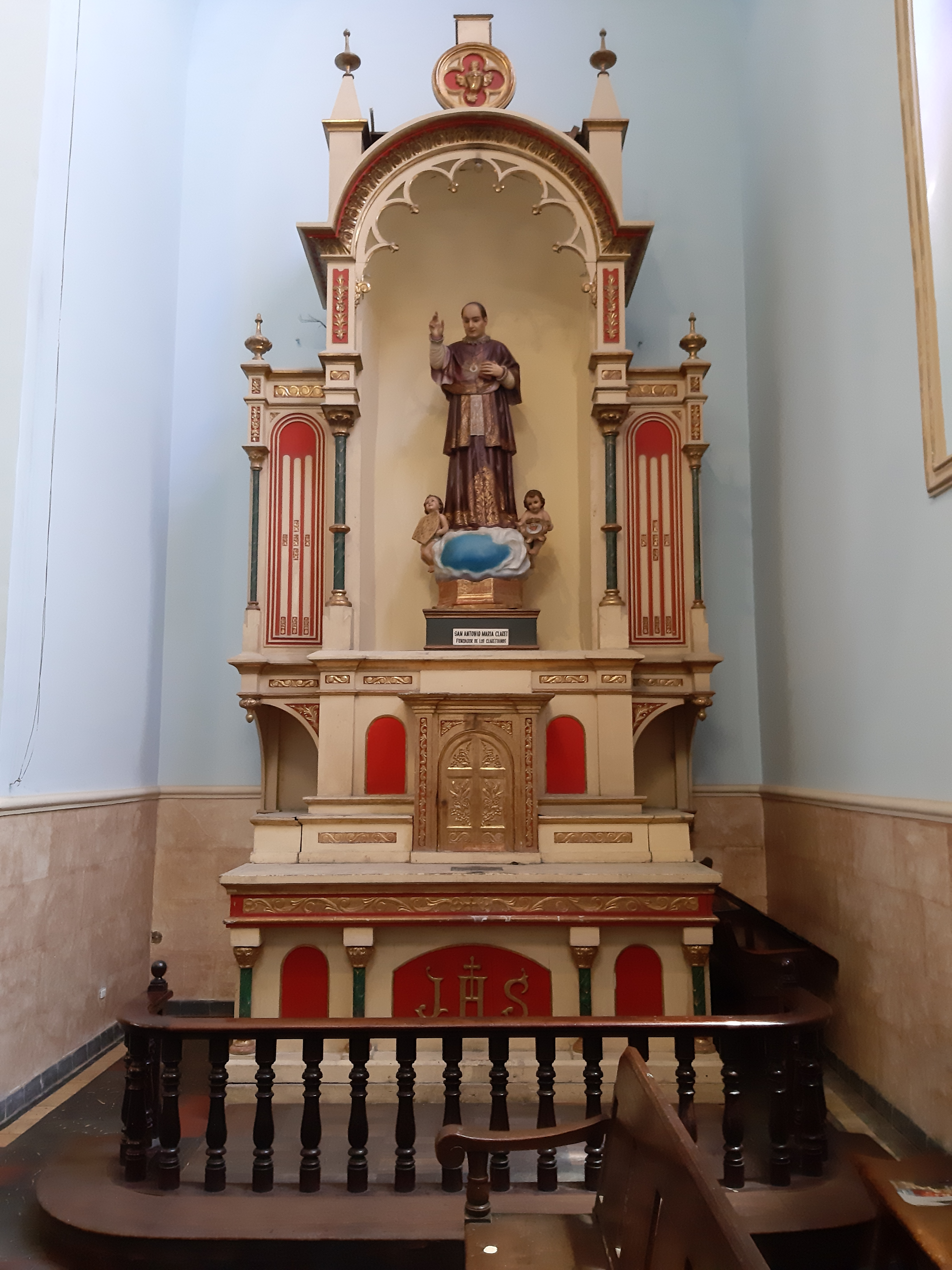
Second main altarpiece the temple had until the early 50s, although it has lost some details such as the cross that was located at the top of the altarpiece. Currently, Saint Anthony Mary Claret is venerated and it is located in the north arm of the transept.

This quote indicates that the first main altarpiece is located in the Popayán chapel, and the comparison of style and structure with photographs confirms this; furthermore, said altarpiece is the only one without a match in the facing chapel. The oldest reference found of this first main altarpiece dates from 1916, the date of the church's consecration. This altarpiece is made of wood, previously covered with plaster that was polychromed or gilded with a yellow bole base. Today, this first altarpiece is preserved almost in its entirety, missing only two rosettes on the side pilasters. (Note: Rosette, in this case refers to: Decorative arts. An ornament featuring floral motifs arranged in a circle.)

A new main altarpiece arrived between 1916 and 1919 (the second in the temple's history), in which the image of the Sacred Heart was venerated, currently stored in the sacristy deposit, accompanied on the sides by sculptures of the Virgin Mary (under the title of the Immaculate Heart), and Saint Joseph, currently located in the niches of the south and north arms of the transept.

On 21 August 1938, the enlargement of the church was inaugurated, which is currently the transept of the building, and with this enlargement came the new area for the presbytery, thanks to the new lands acquired between 1925 and 1927. The new presbytery area is the area between the current four pillars that support the dome, i.e., the crossing. The second main altarpiece is moved to the new presbytery.

According to historical documentation and the comparison of style, structure, and forms of the photographs of the second main altarpiece, it was determined that it is the same altarpiece currently located in the north arm of the transept, where the image of Saint Anthony Mary Claret is venerated. This altarpiece is made of wood, previously covered with plaster that was polychromed or gilded with a red bole base, and has several missing pieces.

The third and current main altarpiece, including the current sculpture of the Sacred Heart of Jesus, was designed by the artist Ricardo Acevedo Bernal at the request of Fr. Pueyo and commissioned around 1950 from the "Talleres de Arte Granda" in Madrid, Spain, by the first parish priest of the Temple, Fr. Alfredo Martínez, with the help of donations collected by Fr. Ignacio Trujillo. During his visit to Spain that same year, Fr. Juan Punset "formalized the contract with Casa Granda for the altar of the Heart of Jesus in Madrid".

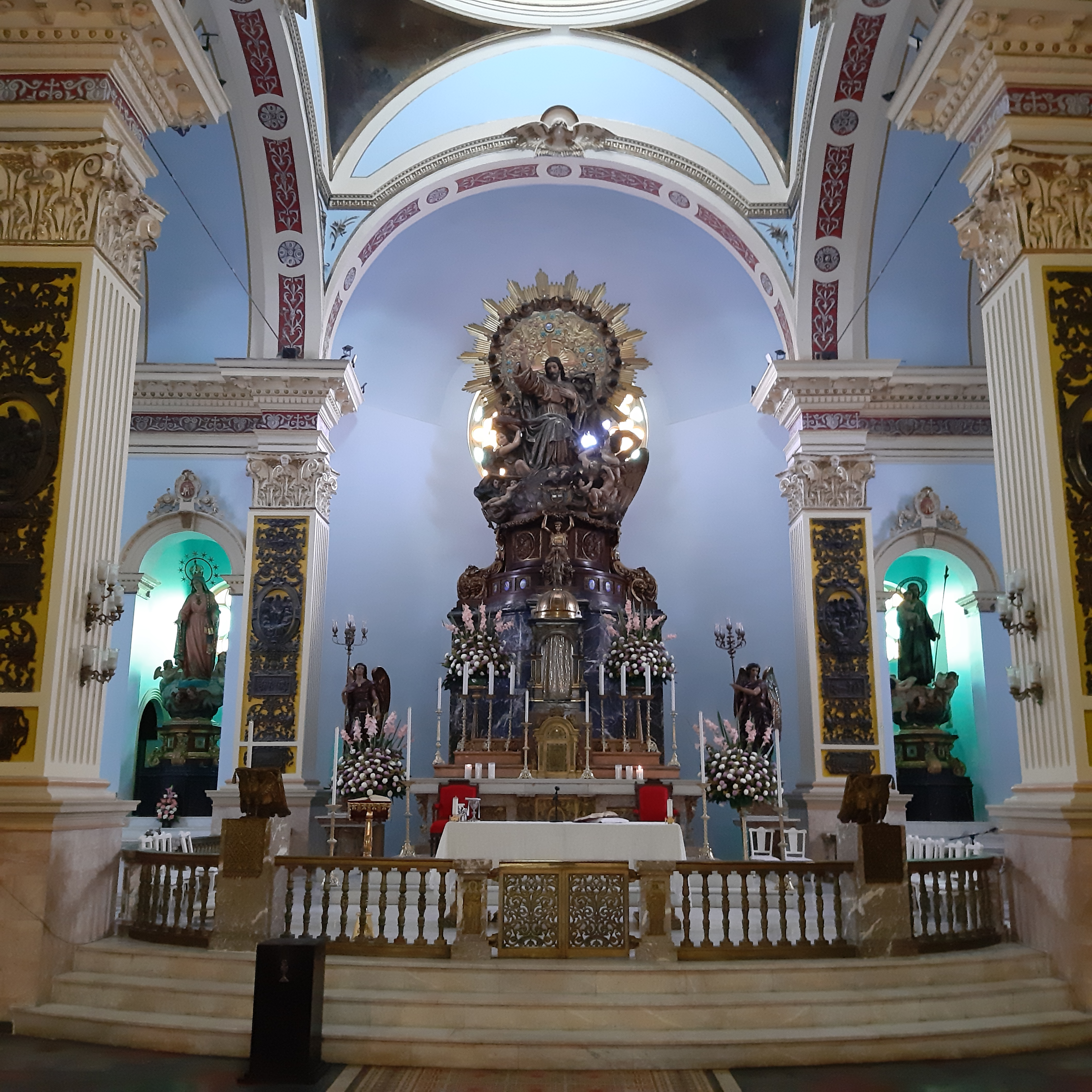
View of the current presbytery.

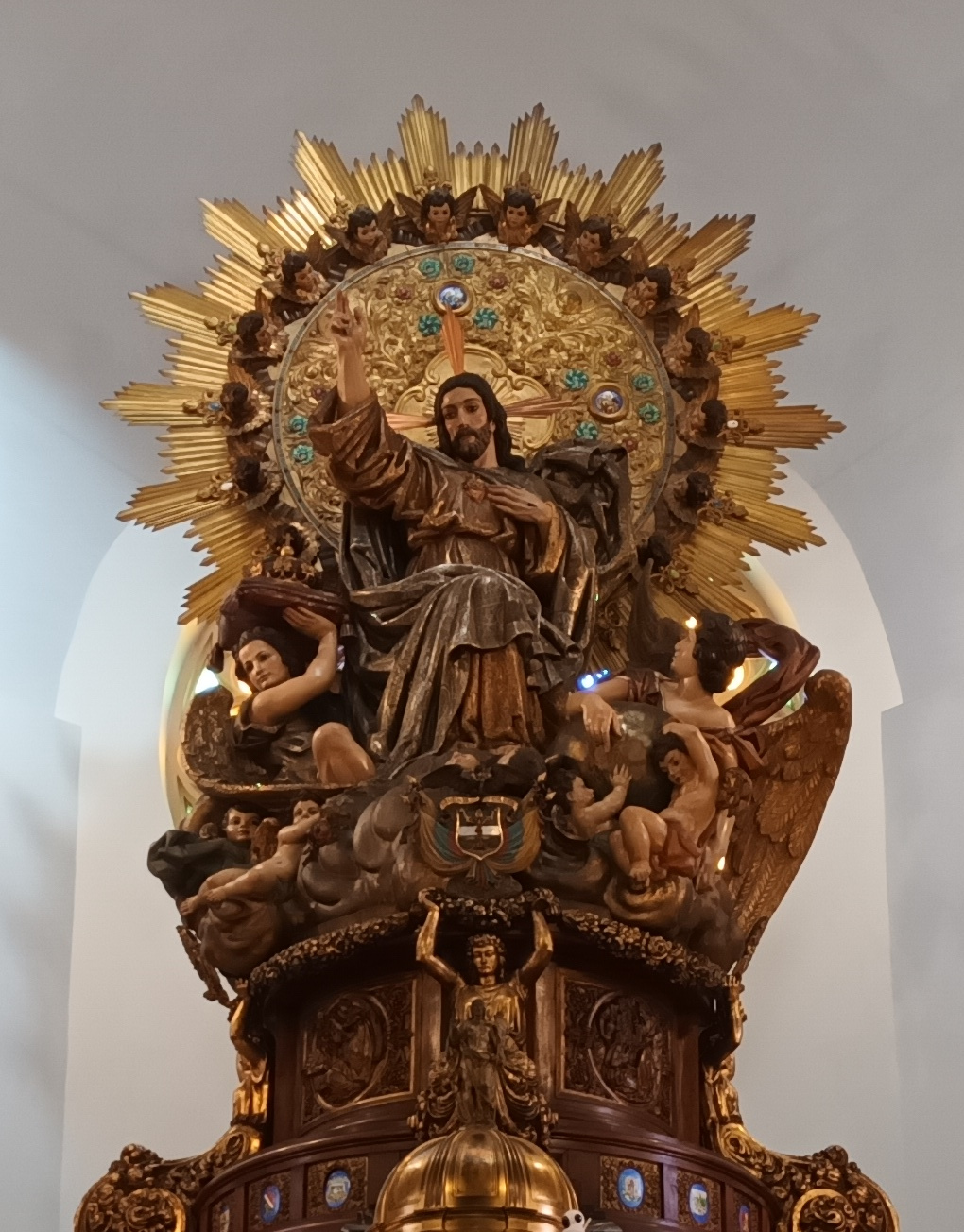
Image of the seated Jesus under the title of the Sacred Heart, designed by Maestro Ricardo Acevedo Bernal and made by Talleres de Arte Granda.

Finally, in 1952, the altar and main altarpiece of the Voto arrived from Spain in 224 boxes received by Fr. Jesús Bahillo, parish priest. The assembly was carried out in 40 days; "three technicians came from the Madrid workshops: one in charge of the marble section; the second for the bronze parts; the third as a cabinetmaker and carving master". The main altarpiece and the former main altar are an architectural construction, built in concrete and veneered in marble of various colors. Therefore, between the presbytery floor and the crypt, an additional foundation and structure were built to transmit the loads to the ground; two load-bearing walls were built in an east–west direction and two columns connected by beams; in the spaces left between the walls, new ossuaries were installed.

Details of the presbytery

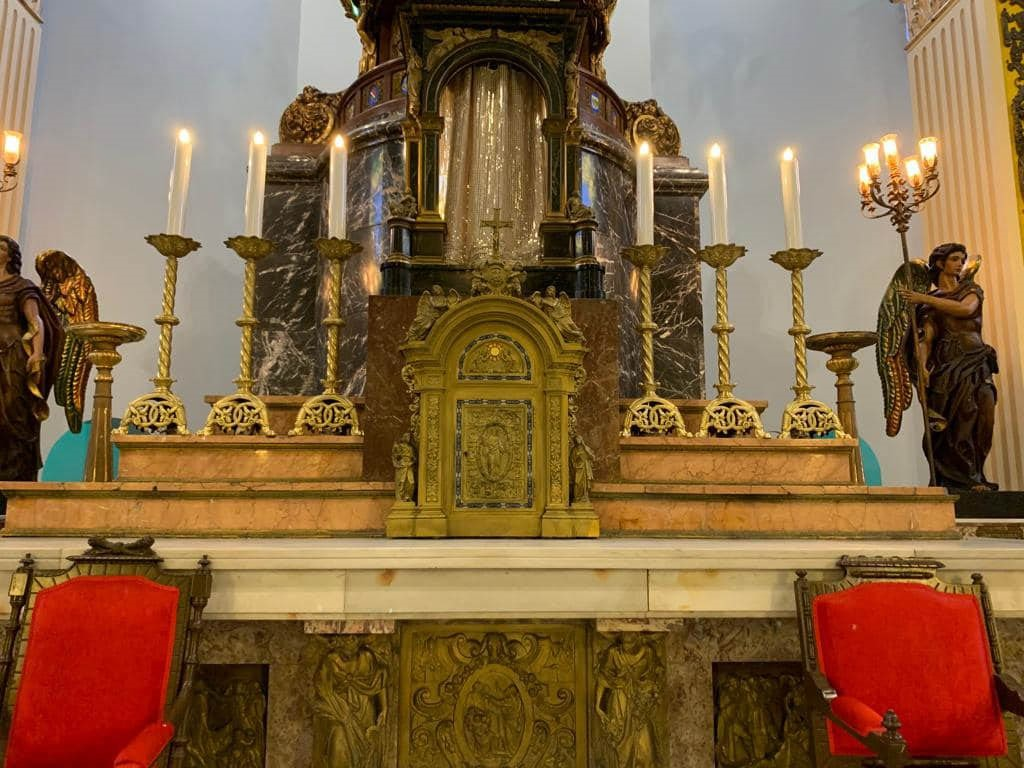
View of the tabernacle and the former main altar

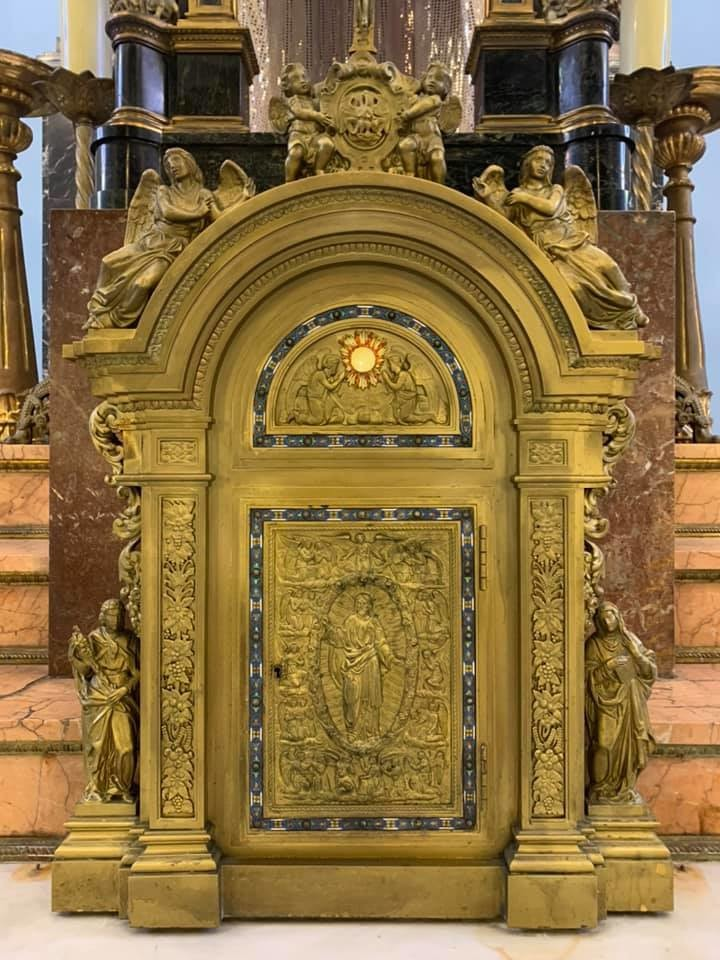
Tabernacle

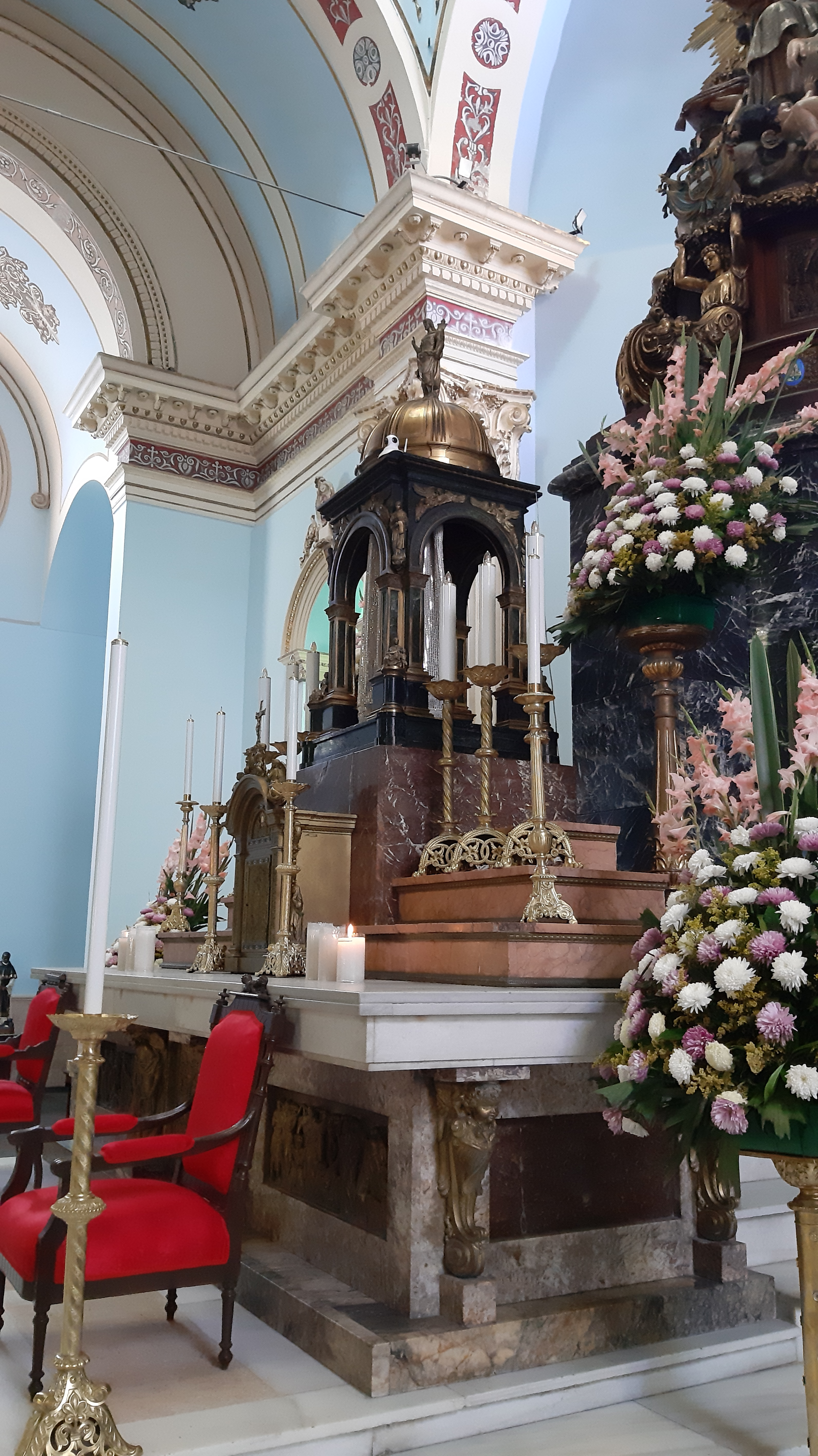
Side view of the former main altar

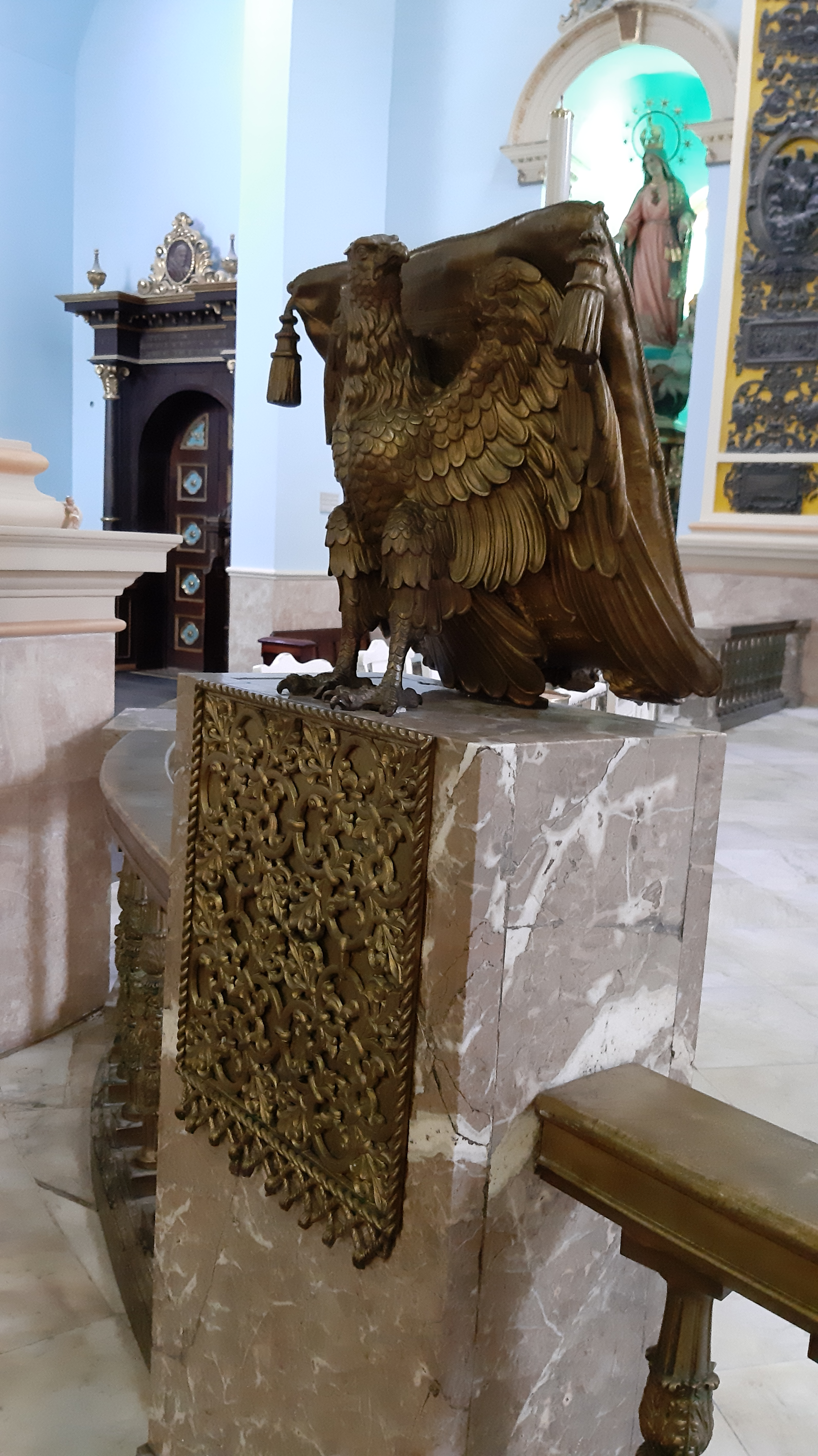
South ambo

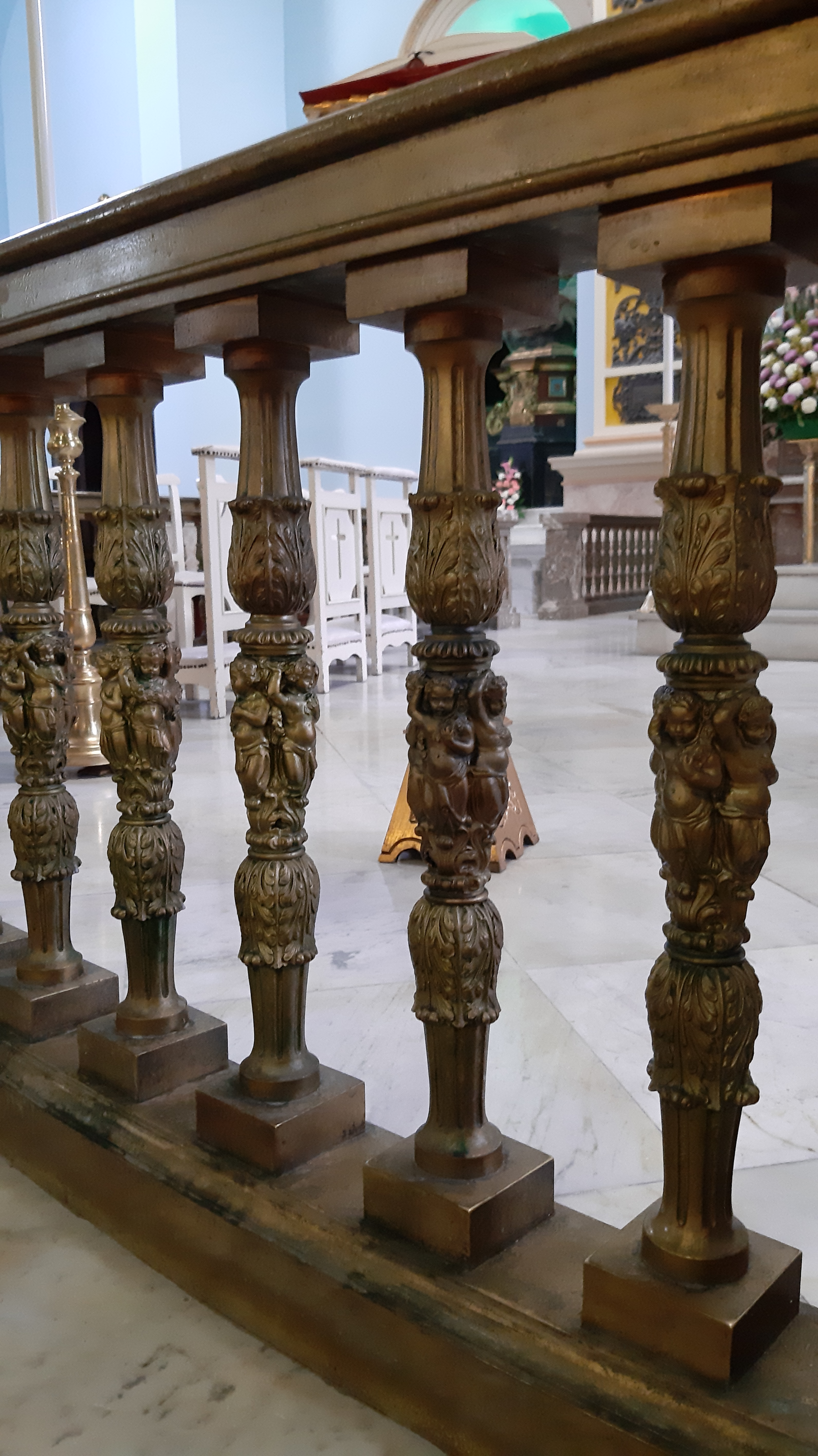
Detail of the balustrade

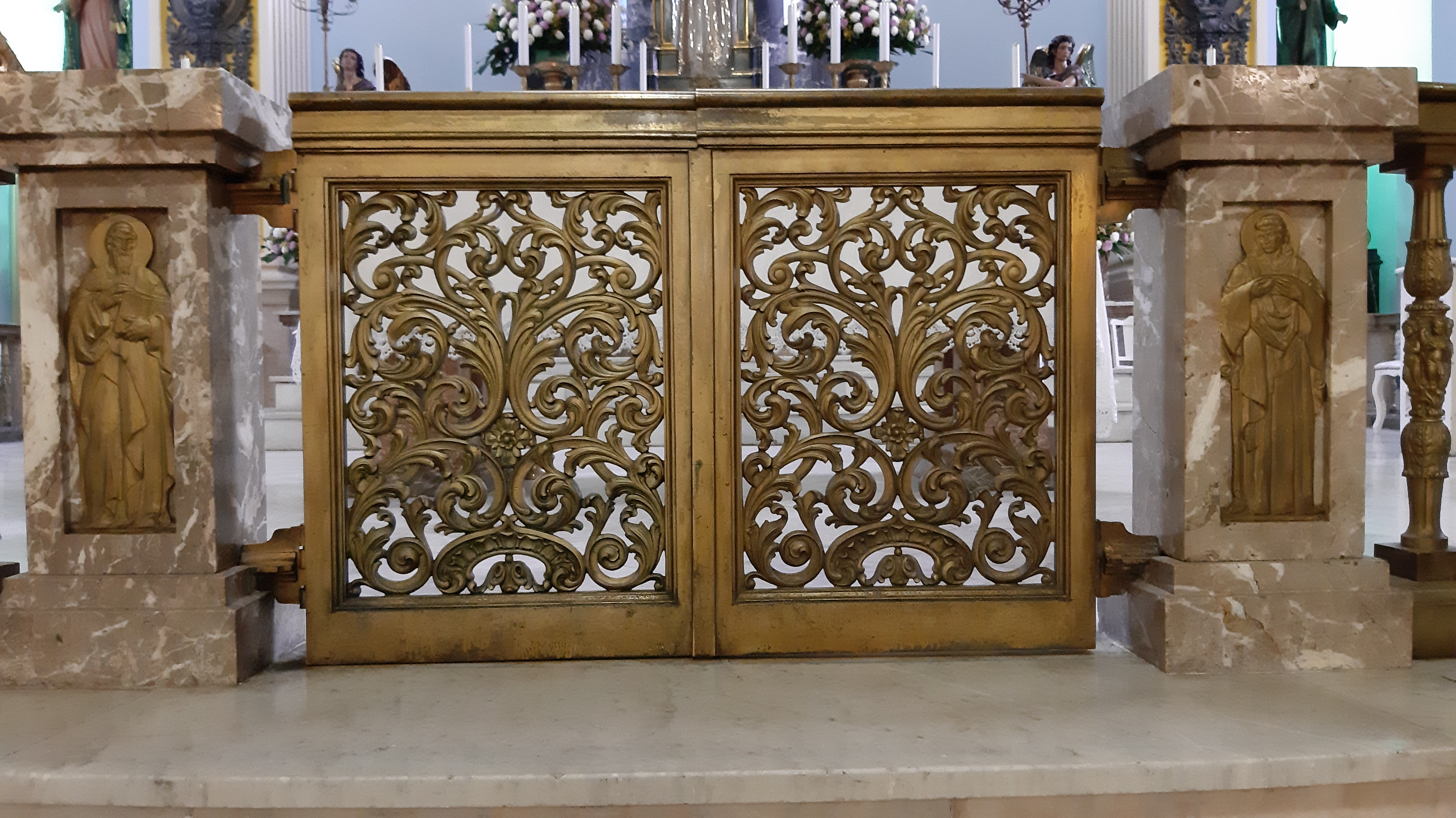
Doors of the communion rail

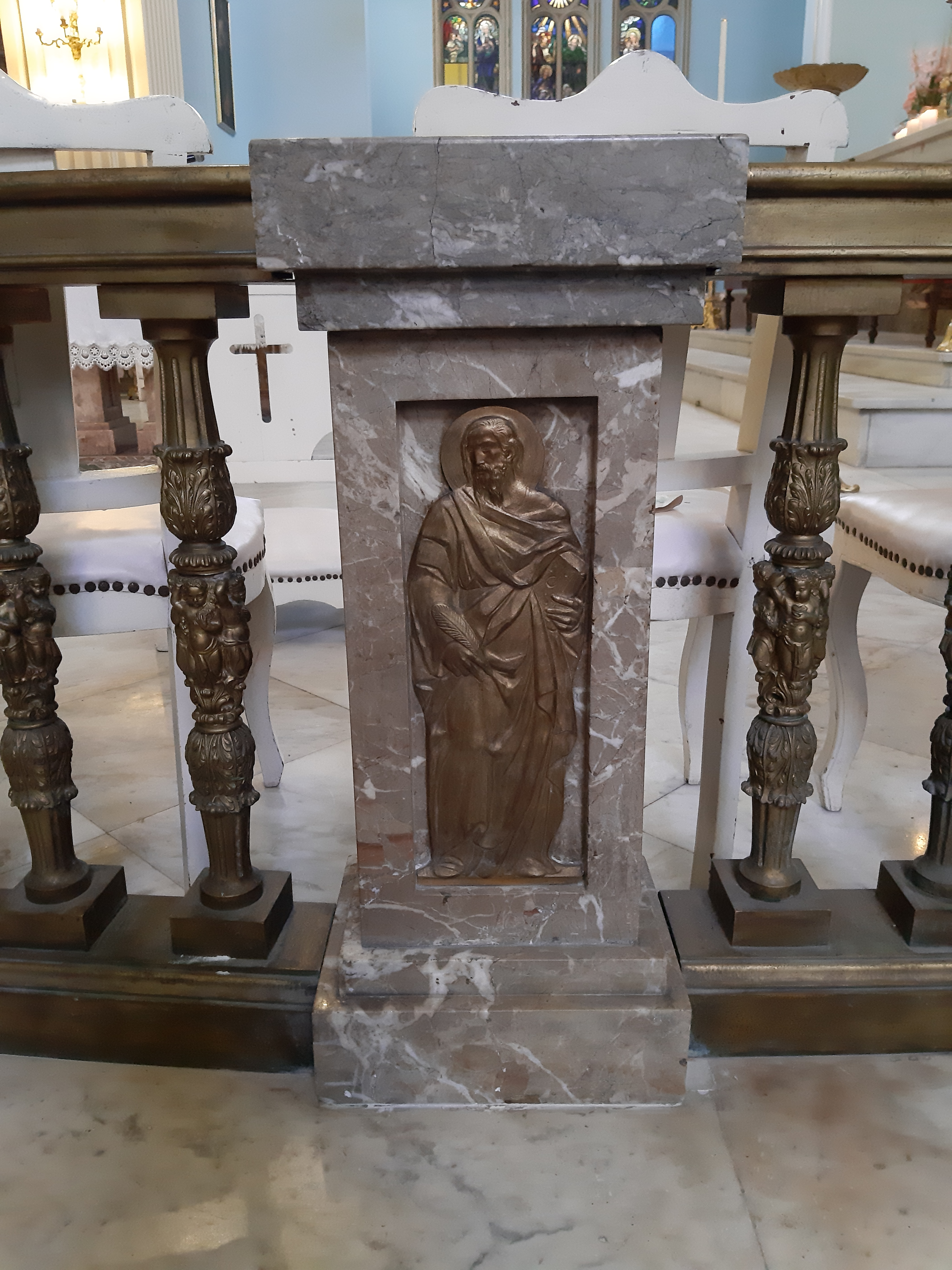
Detail of the communion rail

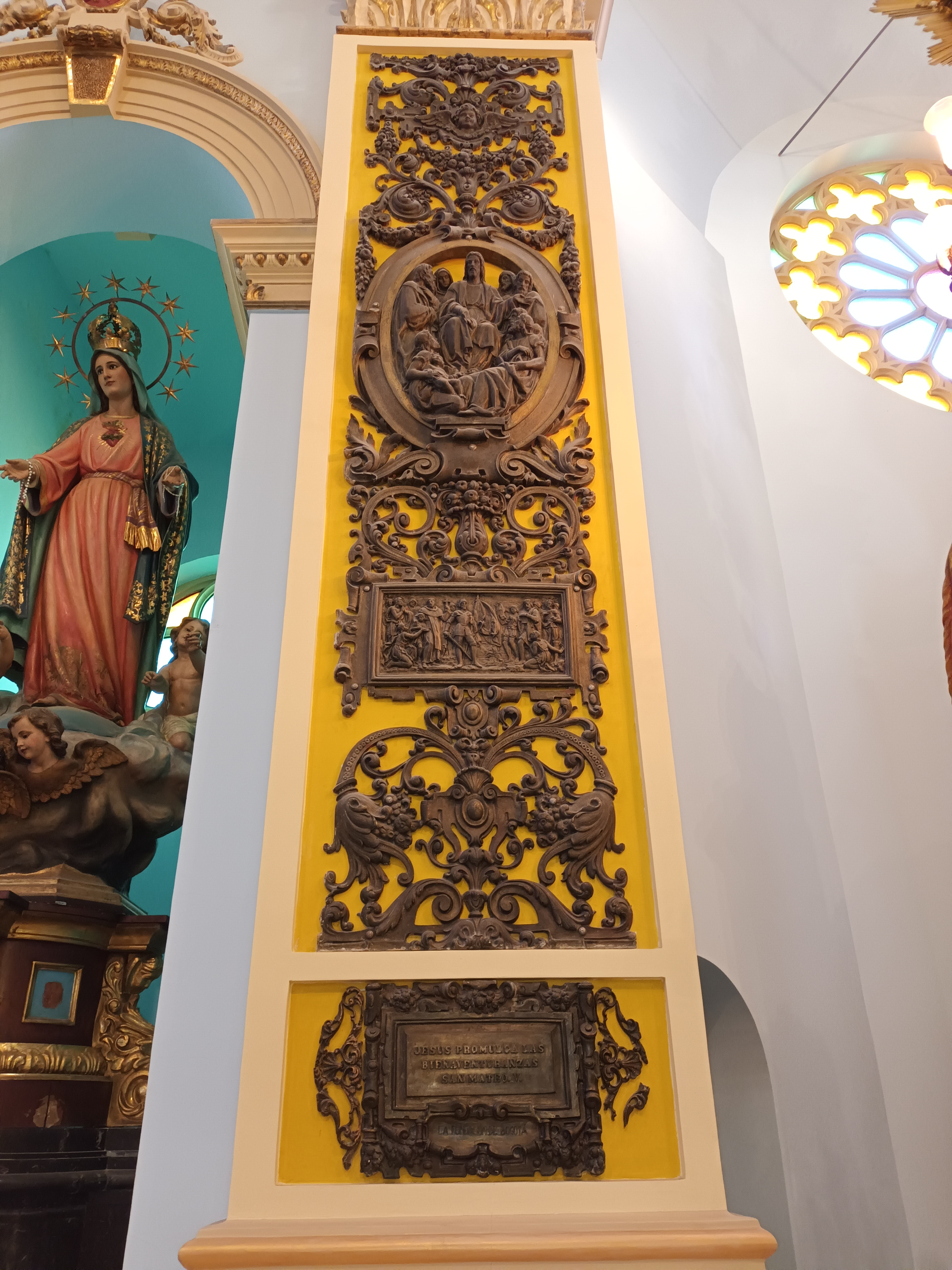
Bronze applique on a pillar

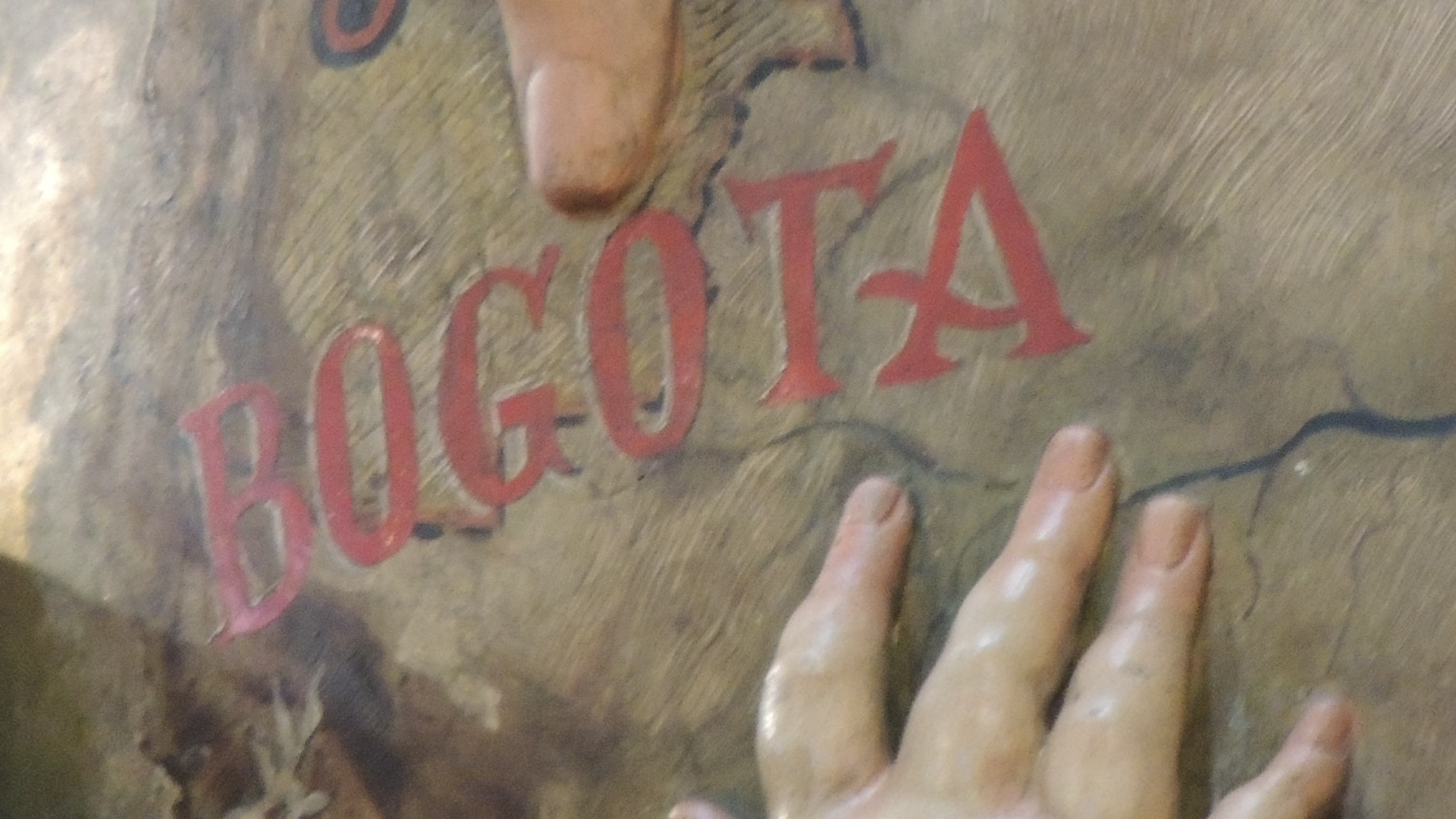
Angels' fingers pointing to the location of Bogotá on the terrestrial sphere

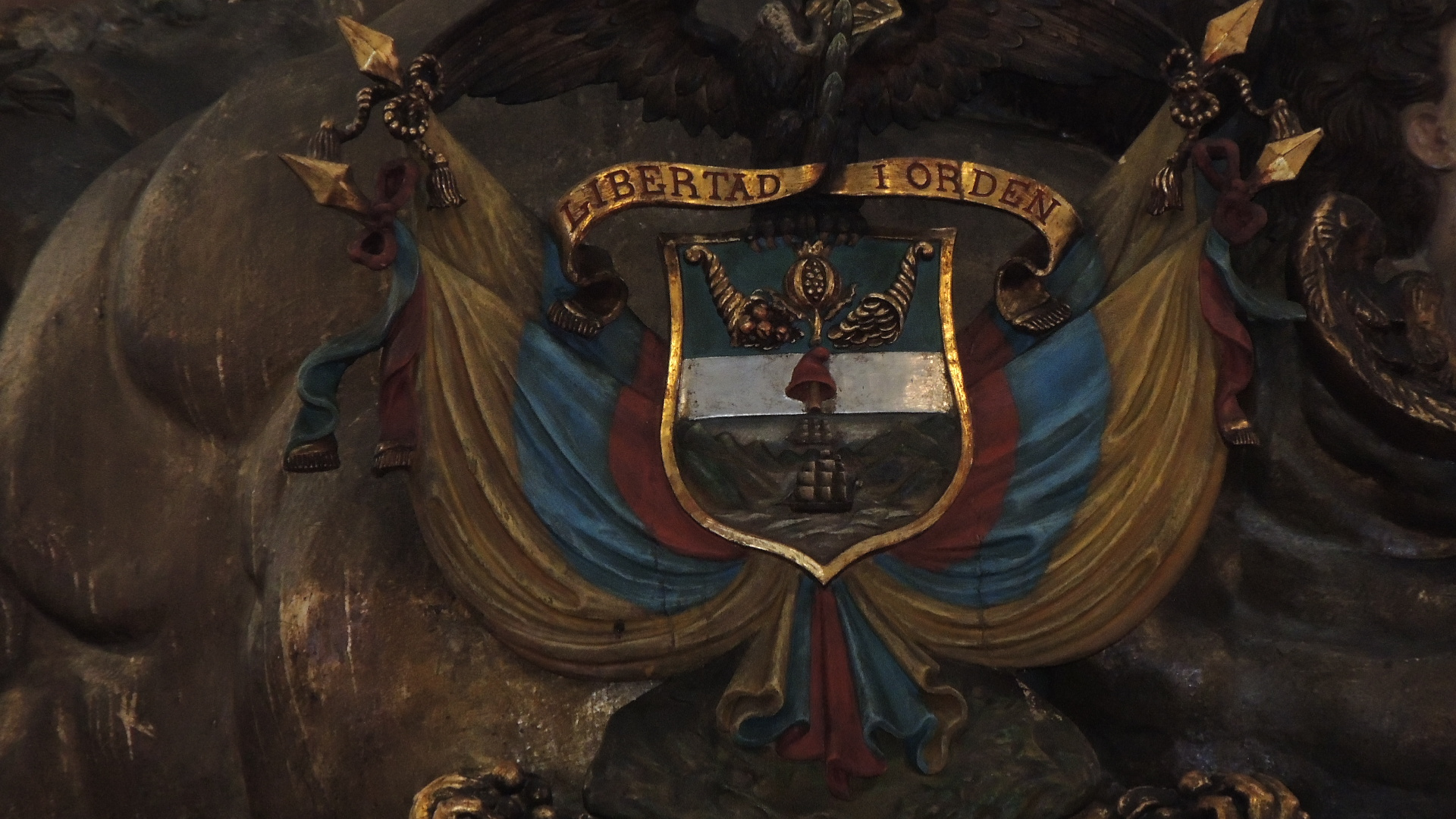
Detail of the Coat of Arms of Colombia

On 11 January 1953, Monsignor Emilio de Brigard Ortiz, auxiliary bishop of Bogotá, blessed the Tabernacle, Monstrance, and image of the Sacred Heart, and on 14 June of the same year it was consecrated by Bishop Pedro Grau Arola, Apostolic Vicar of Quibdó who received his episcopal consecration on 31 May 1953 at the Voto Nacional temple. Currently, this altar and main altarpiece are as installed by Casa Granda, except for the coat of arms of Colombia, which is a movable piece that was stolen years ago and replaced by the current plaster coat of arms.

The presbytery is situated at the far end of the longitudinal nave, in the space comprising the crossing and the apse, directly under the dome. The crossing is the space generated by the intersection of the longitudinal nave and the transept. The presbytery is elevated by three steps from the rest of the temple and framed by the four pillars. It is enclosed from the general public by a bronze communion rail. In the presbytery are the main altar, the main altarpiece with the image of Jesus, two ambos, and two credence tables supporting two large statues of angels.

The seated image of Jesus is the central sculpture of the entire temple; it is made of polychromed and gilded plaster with wooden appliqués, and the background disk is gilded and enamelled bronze. This sculpture exaggerates anatomical proportions to create an effect of grandeur on the viewer. The caryatids supporting the former altar table and the bases of the angels are gilded plaster. The balustrade of the communion rail is made of gilded bronze, as are the door decorations and the top of the tabernacle, which combine this technique with enamel (cloisonné). The appliqués on the pillar shafts are patinated (black) bronze. The ambos are made of pink marble with gilded bronze appliqués.

==== Side chapels ====
The 16 side chapels represent the 14 episcopal sees that existed at the time of the temple's consecration: three archdioceses: Cartagena, Popayán, and Medellín; and 11 dioceses: Jericó, Cali, Ibagué, Garzón, Manizales, Socorro, Santa Marta, Pamplona, Pasto, Antioquia, and Tunja (although some dioceses are now archdioceses); additionally, two chapels were included for Panama (which at that time was no longer part of Colombia) and the National Police.

In general terms, the altarpieces of the chapels have the following construction stages:

- the altarpieces of the 16 church chapels, before 1913, had as initial pieces tables with stone columns without polychromy.
- the altarpieces of the Manizales Chapel and the Antioquia Chapel have stone bases that were carved in 1913.
- the altarpieces of the Cali Chapel, Socorro Chapel, and Santa Marta Chapel have bases made of colored marbles by Italian Marble Works, between 1916 and 1920.
- the altarpieces of the Jericó Chapel and the Medellín Chapel have bodies made by Italian Marble Works in colored marbles, between 1916 and 1920.
- the altarpieces of the Panama Chapel, Cali Chapel, Ibagué Chapel, Garzón Chapel, Manizales Chapel, Socorro Chapel, Tunja Chapel, Antioquia Chapel, Pasto Chapel, Pamplona Chapel, and Santa Marta Chapel have bodies made of polychromed wood by Maestro Eugenio Vargas, between 1916 and 1919.
- the altarpieces of the Cartagena chapel and the National Police chapel were remodeled in colored marbles and bronze pieces in 1954 by Talleres de Arte Granda.
- Initially, the niches of the altarpieces were not deep, so the sculptures were located on the intrados of each altarpiece, but in 1956 the fourteen niches of the side chapels were rebuilt and enlarged in more durable material.

The first elements that adorned the 16 chapels from the first decade of the church's construction were the altar table and its stone columns, but without any altarpiece, as mentioned in one of the chronicles by Fr. Martín Jové in 1913: "The chapels, now small side aisles formed by closed walls down to the bottom, only with a table...".

The oldest known image of the altarpieces is a photograph of the Pasto chapel, consecrated on 23 September 1916, published in the serial publication El Gráfico that same month. In said photograph, the stone table that still exists can be seen, as well as the arches allowing people to move between the chapels.

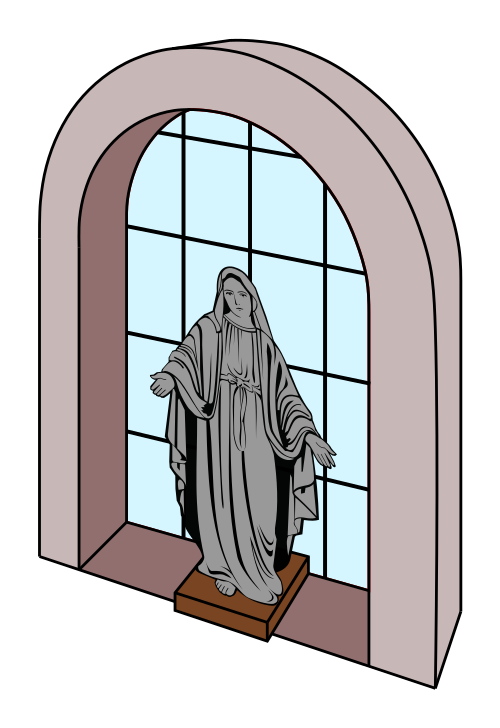
Example of a sculpture located on the intrados of a semicircular arch.

A series of photographs published in various printed media in different years allows us to analyze that the altarpieces did not initially have a deep niche as they do today. For example, in one of the photographs from 1920, the altarpiece of the Medellín chapel had a flat window instead of the current deep niches; this window was the initial structure that preceded the current niches. This altarpiece is currently preserved with all its pieces and structure, except for the current niche. This allows us to understand the initial way in which the sculptures were located on the intrados of each altarpiece, without the current deep niche.

However, another photograph published in 1922 of the altarpiece of the Tunja chapel, which houses the sculptural group of the Crucifixion, clearly shows a shallow niche, presenting a shallow vaulted space very close to the cross, indicating that some altarpieces had a small initial niche starting from the intrados of the semicircular arch, where the sculptures were located.

Another altarpiece for which information is available is that of the Cali chapel. In 1919, "the sculptural group of the Assumption arrived at the Cali chapel" and its altar, made by Italian Marble Works and by Maestro Eugenio Vargas, cost 3000 pesos. There is a photograph taken in 1948 in which it can be seen that the sculpture is still located on the intrados, exactly on the edge. The windows or structure of the current deep niche are not yet visible, which may mean that the current niches had not yet been installed by that year.

No specific information is available for the remaining side altarpieces; however, it is known that their completion spanned several years, as in 1922 bazaars continued to be held "For the benefit of the temple of the Sacred Heart of Jesus (...) and the completion of some altars". Fr. José Payas relates the evolution of the church from 1912 to 1941, indicating that the completion of the altarpieces extended until the end of the 1920s:

The glory of having the first altar completely finished with its altarpiece of local marble -Italian Marble Works- and its group of the 4th joyful mystery belongs to the diocese of Medellín, which had it finished in September 1926. That of Tunja with its 5th sorrowful mystery and that of Garzón with the Sorrowful Virgin were also the first to fulfill this sacred commitment. This beautiful idea has not yet been fully realized. As a curious fact, it is worth adding that the diocese of Panama, now an archdiocese, also has its altar and altarpiece finished and beautiful: that of the Virgin of Perpetual Help.

—

The altarpieces of the Cartagena and National Police chapels are the most recent, made of colored marbles and bronze pieces by "Talleres de Arte Granda" in Madrid, installed in 1954 by technicians who came from Spain, consecrated in 1963 by Fr. Jorge Restrepo (parish priest) and blessed by Msgr. Pedro Grau Arola. Originally, the Cartagena chapel was to house the sculpture "of the Heart of Mary" and that of the National Police "of Saint Joseph"; this would clarify the differences between these two altarpieces and the remaining 14, as they are the only ones with bronze work and have under the altar table the characteristic symbols of both figures: the monogram of Mary and the flowering rod of Saint Joseph. Both altarpieces were designed considering both form and materials; however, the Cartagena altarpiece is lower in height than that of the National Police, which is why they probably resorted to mural painting imitating the top of the other altarpiece to give the appearance of the same finish, since the Cartagena altarpiece is not completely finished in marble.

It is noteworthy that the sculptures currently located in these altarpieces are the Virgin of Fátima in the Cartagena Chapel and the Virgin of Carmen in the National Police chapel. This could be explained by the lower height of the niches in these two chapels relative to the larger size of the Heart of Mary and Saint Joseph sculptures; this reason possibly explains the need to find a new place for these two images, for which two spaces were adapted, consisting of arches located in the south and north arms of the transept, just to the sides of the presbytery, where two niches were created, each with its own marble altar table. In the south niche is the sculpture of the Heart of Mary, and in the north niche is the sculpture of Saint Joseph.

Finally, in 1956, the fourteen niches of the side altars were rebuilt and enlarged in more durable material, as they are today.

These are the chapels on the left, facing the altar. They are the following:

Chapels on the south side (Gospel side).

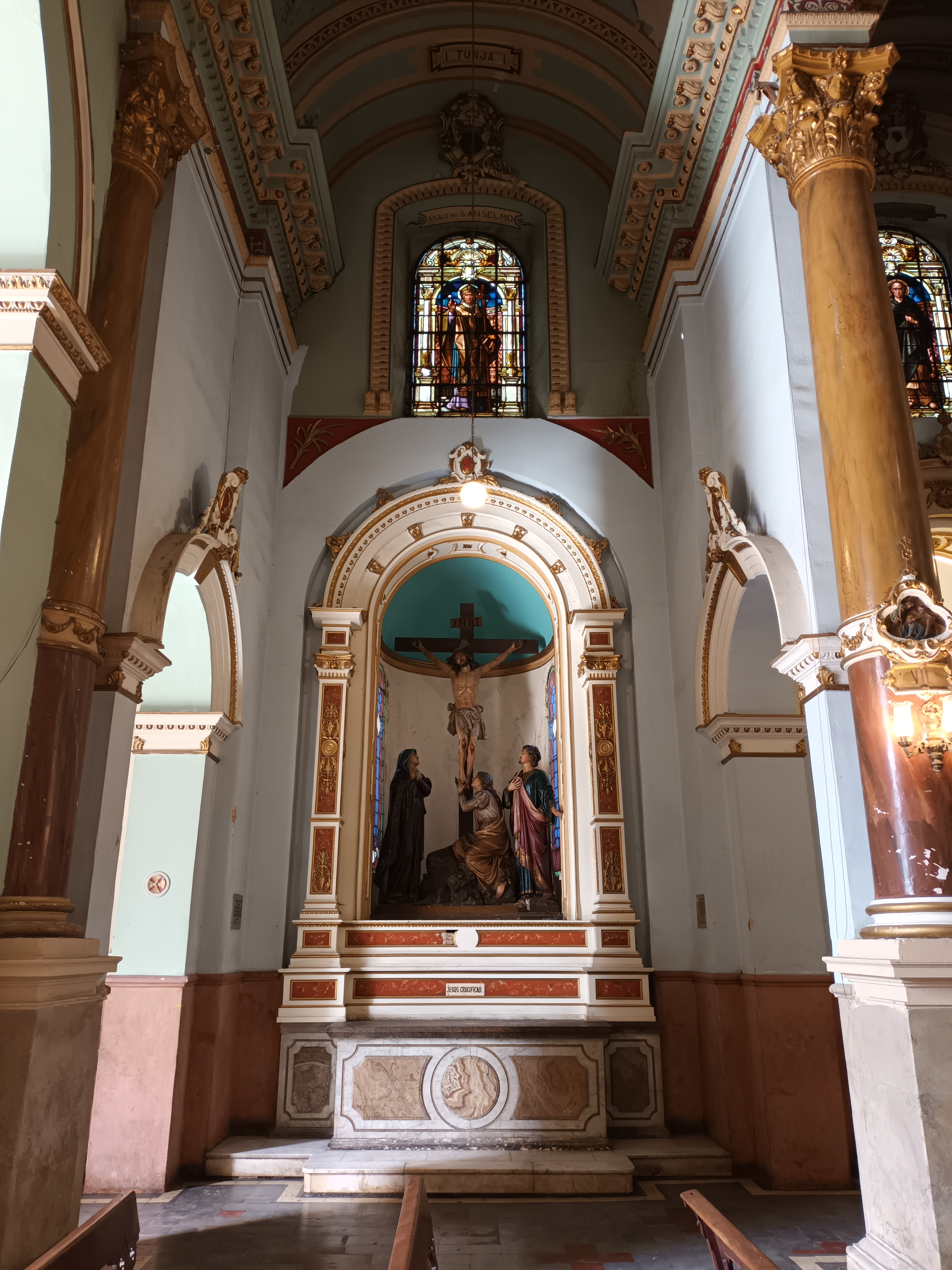
Tunja

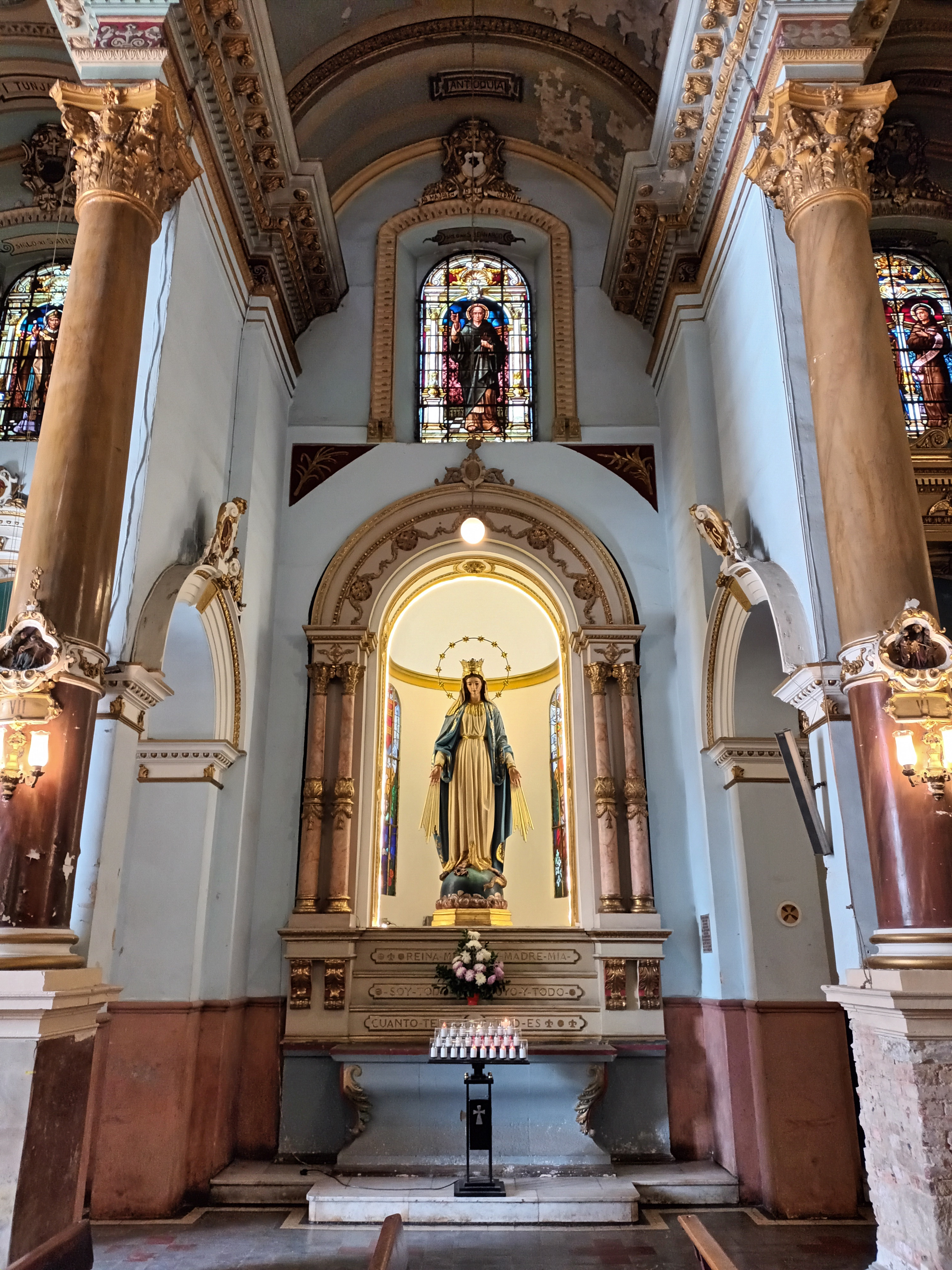
Antioquia

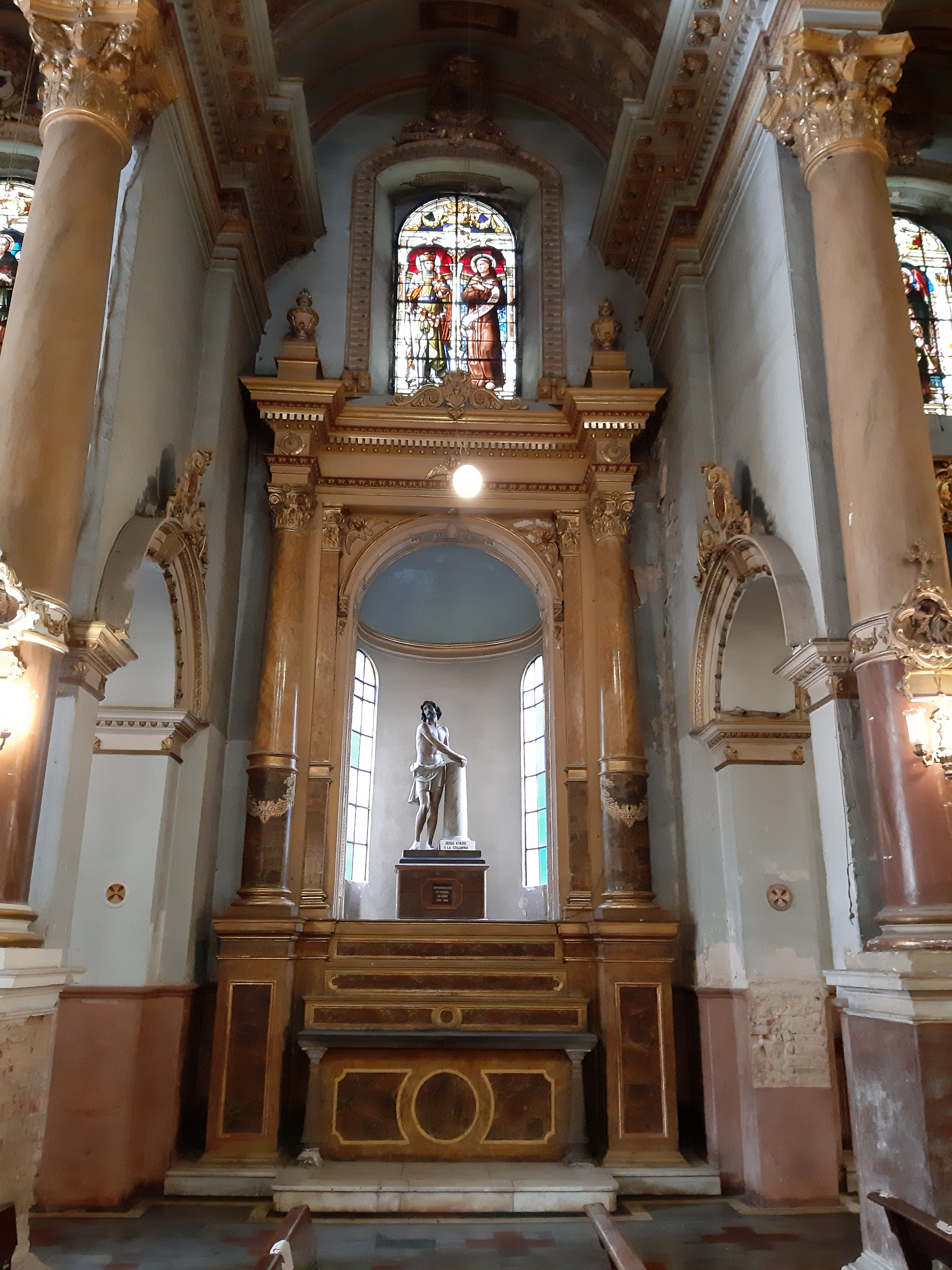
Pasto

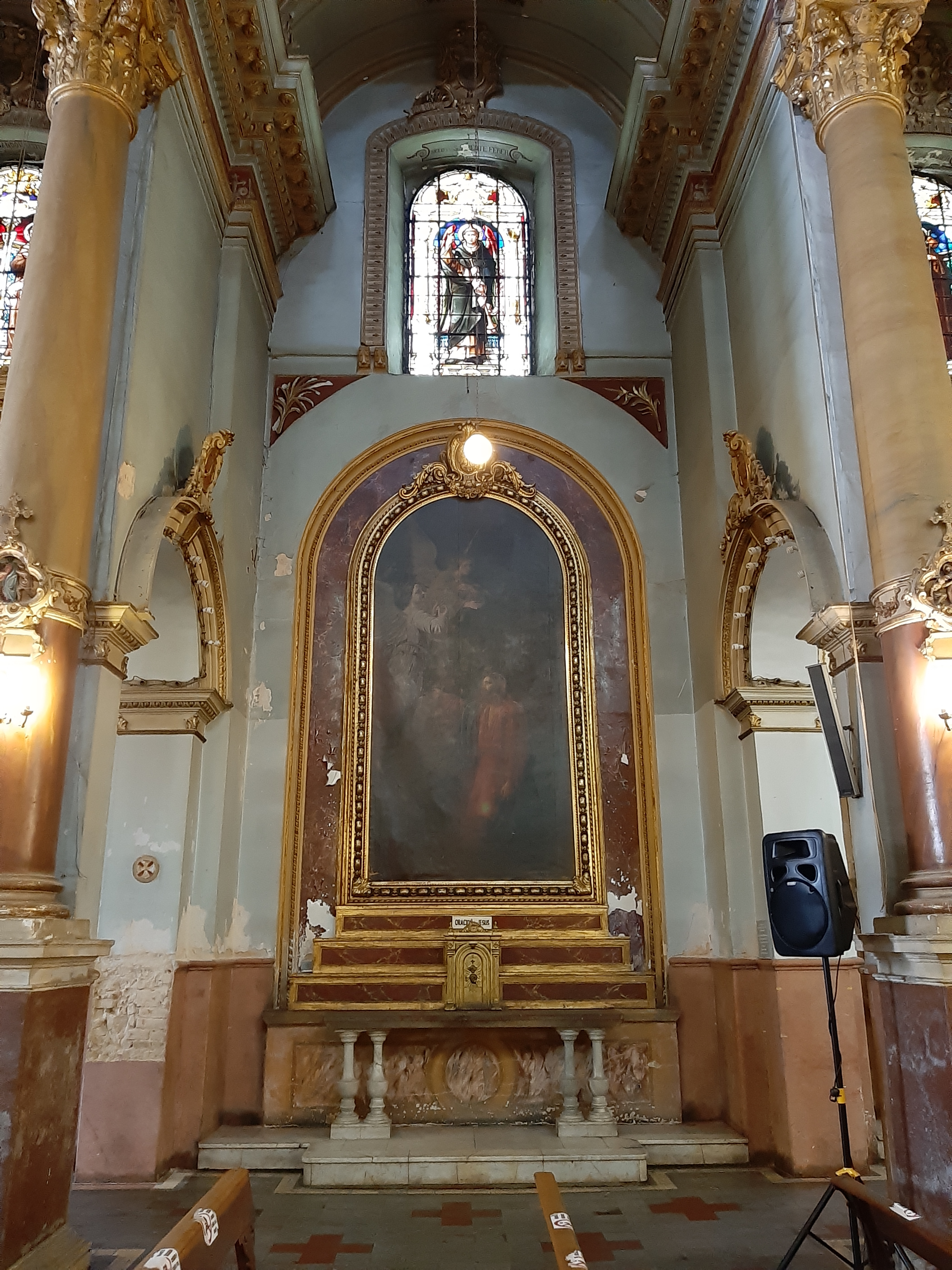
Pamplona

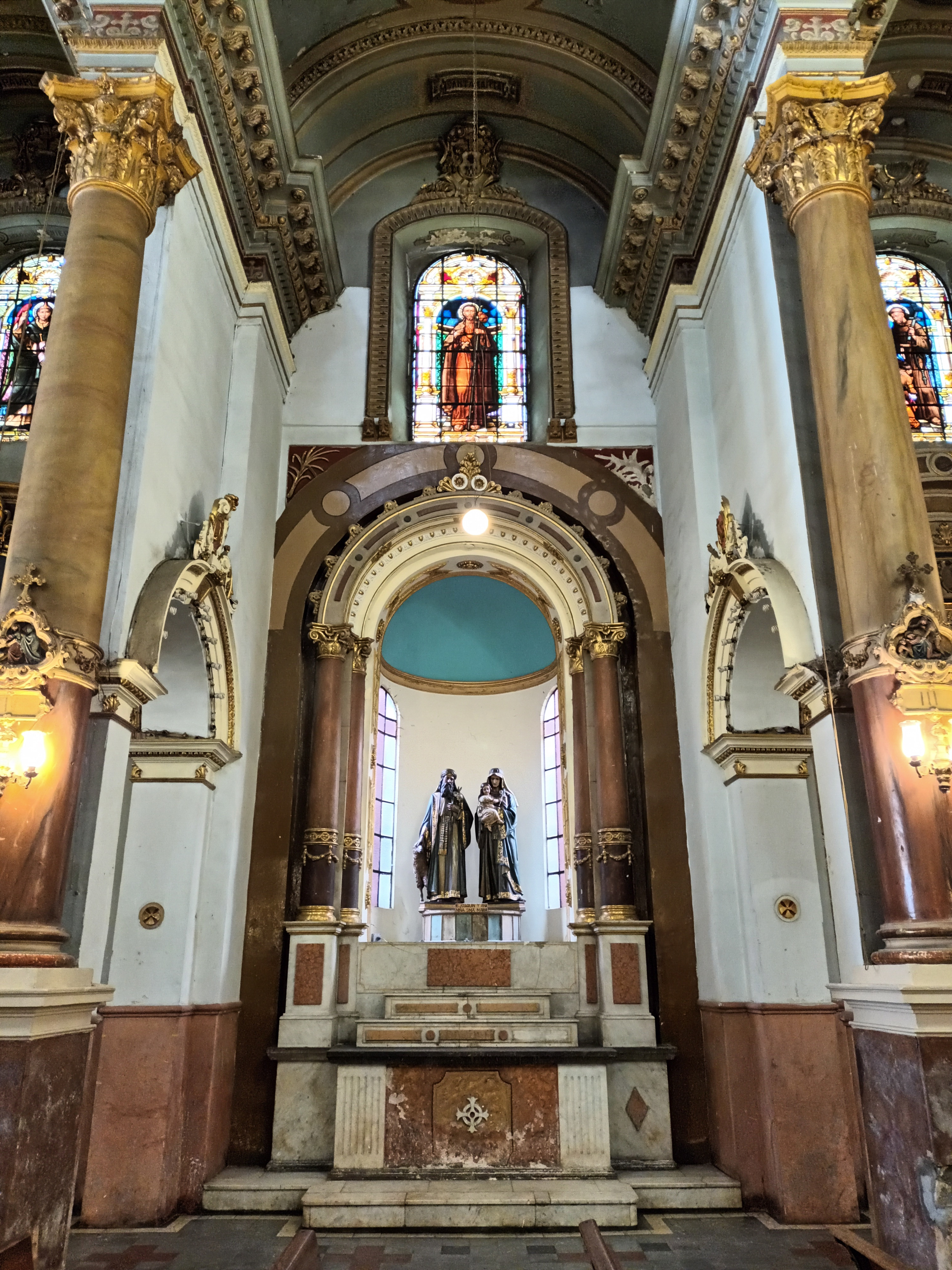
Santa Marta

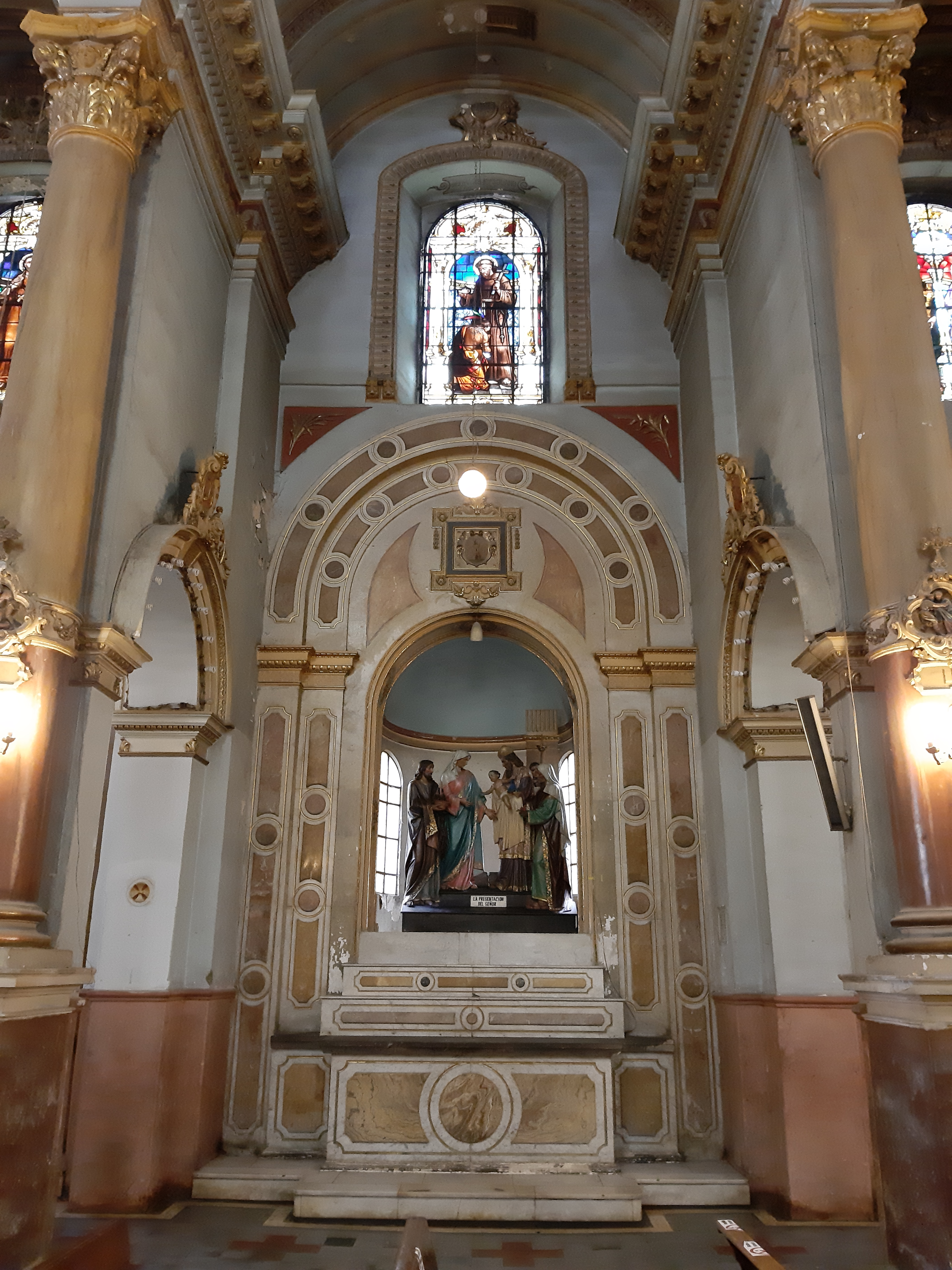
Medellín

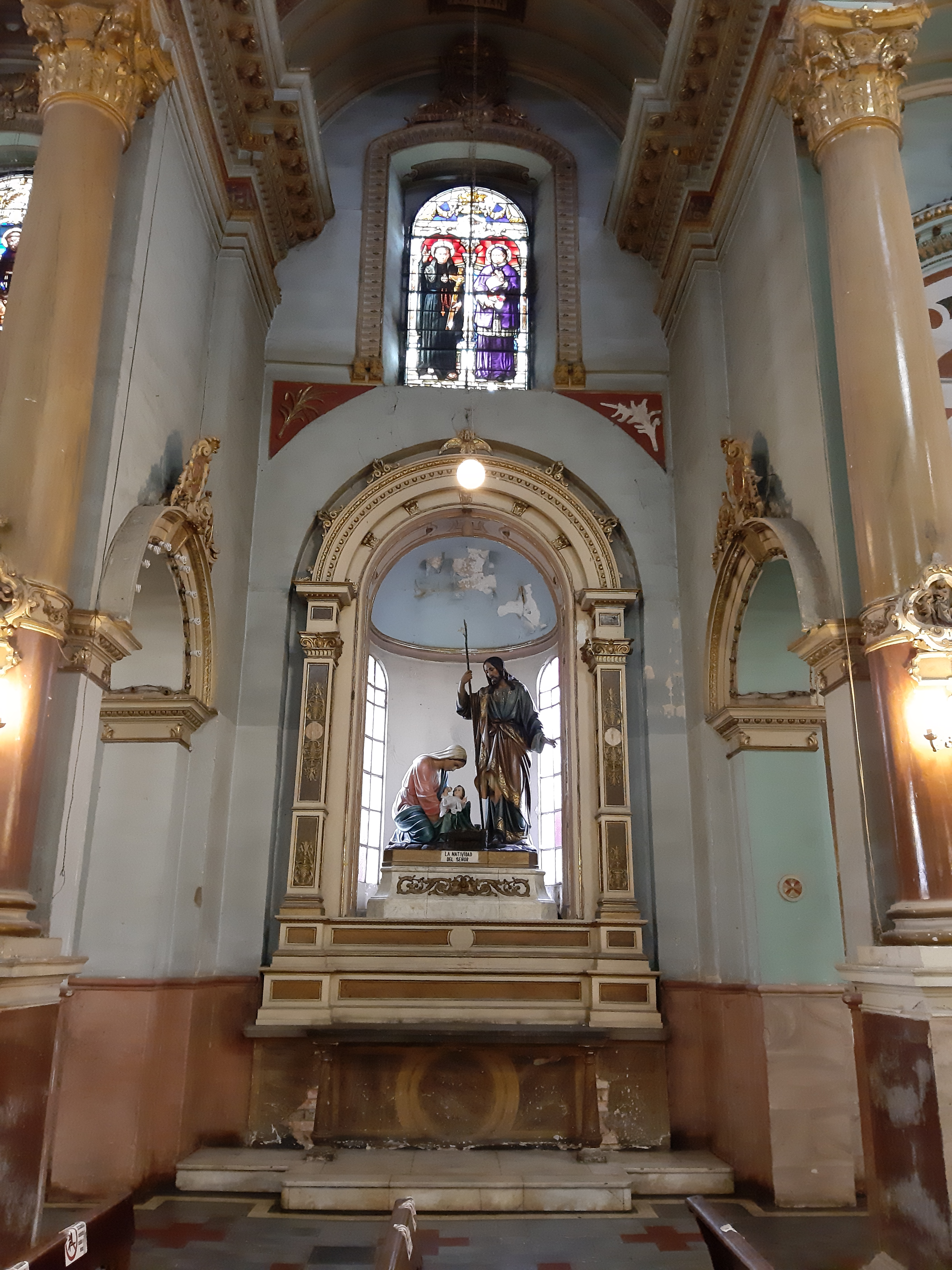
Popayán

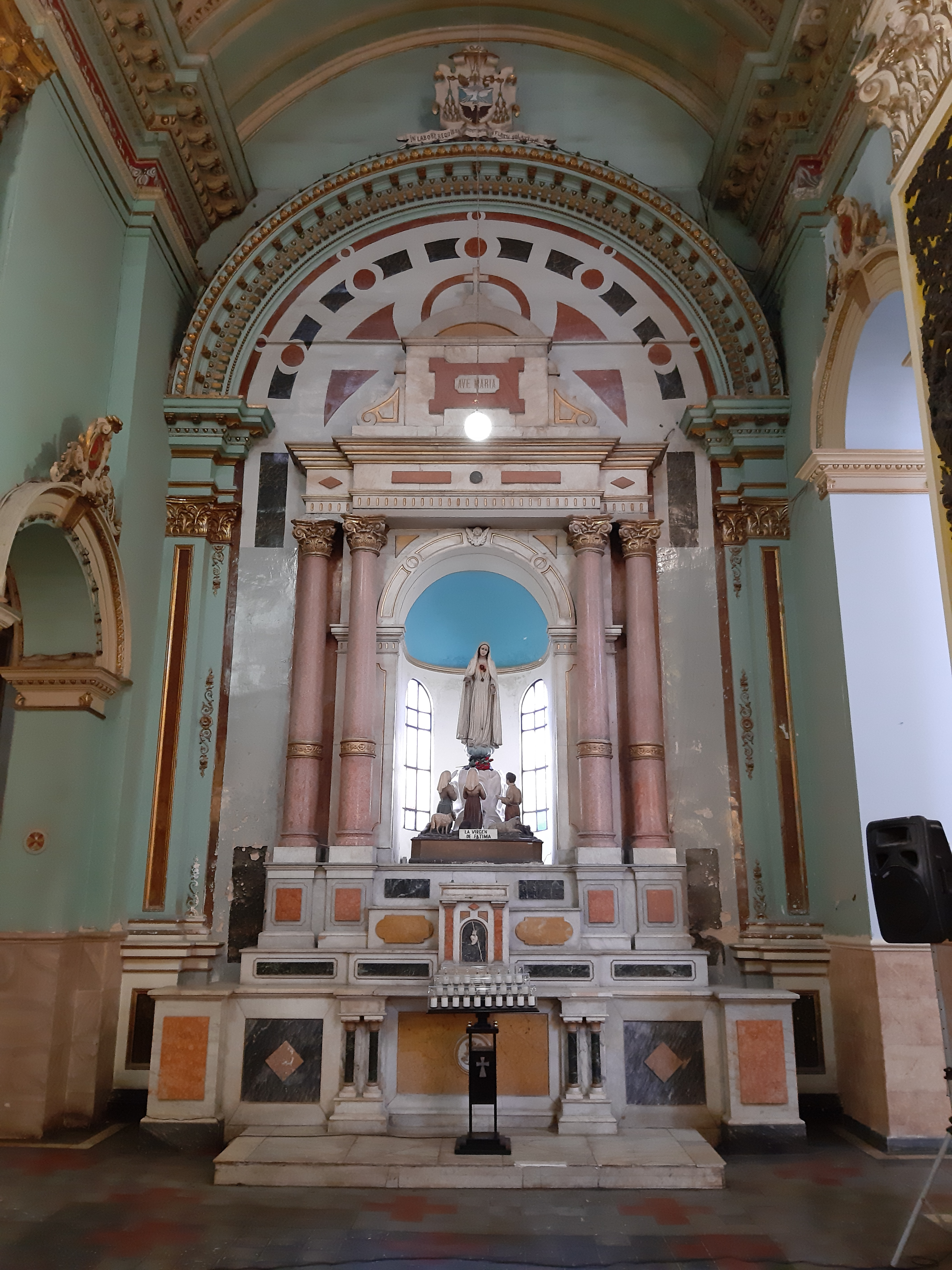
Cartagena

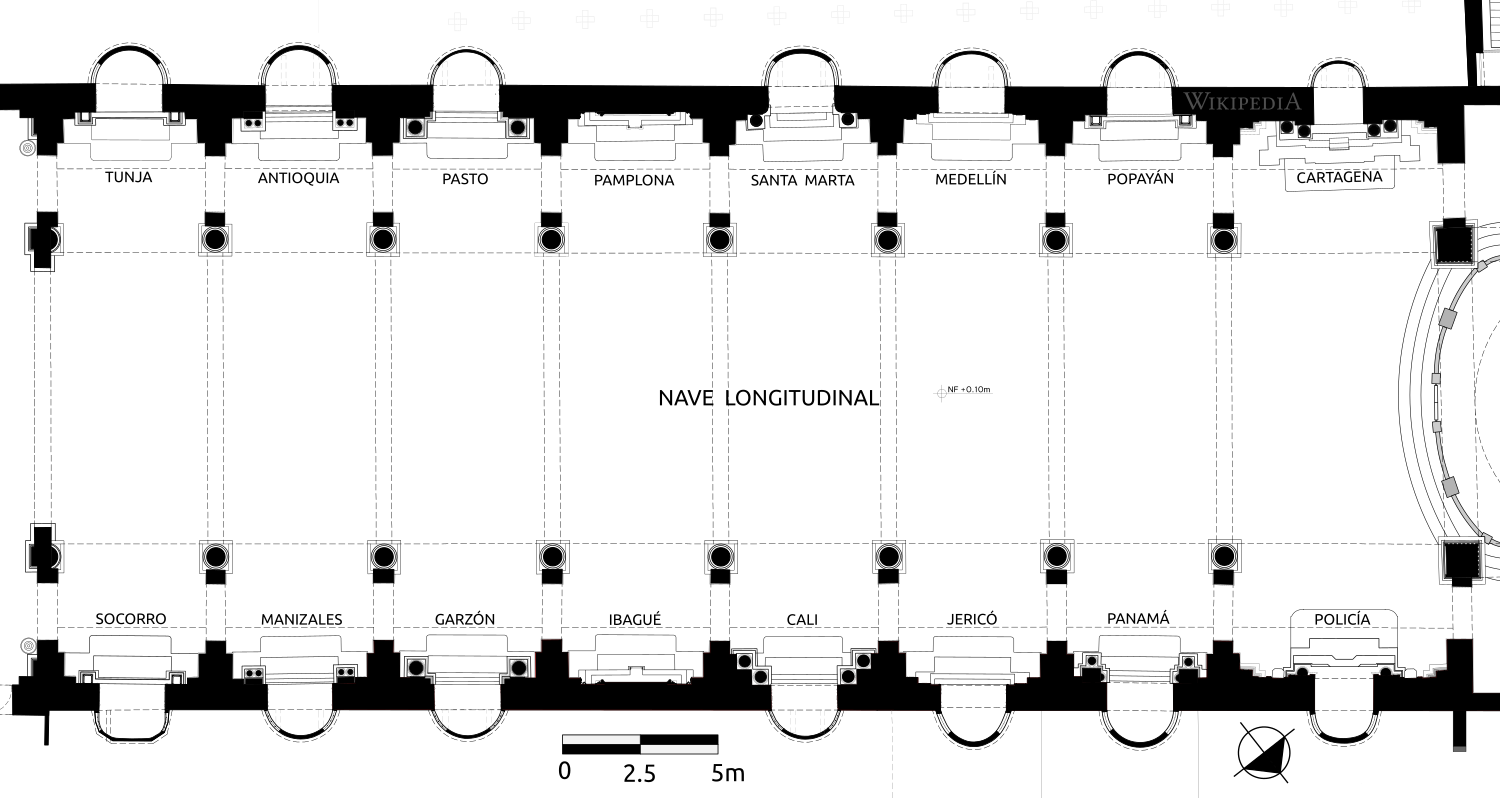
Section of the general plan with the side chapels.

These are the chapels on the right, facing the altar. They are the following:

Chapels on the north side (Epistle side).

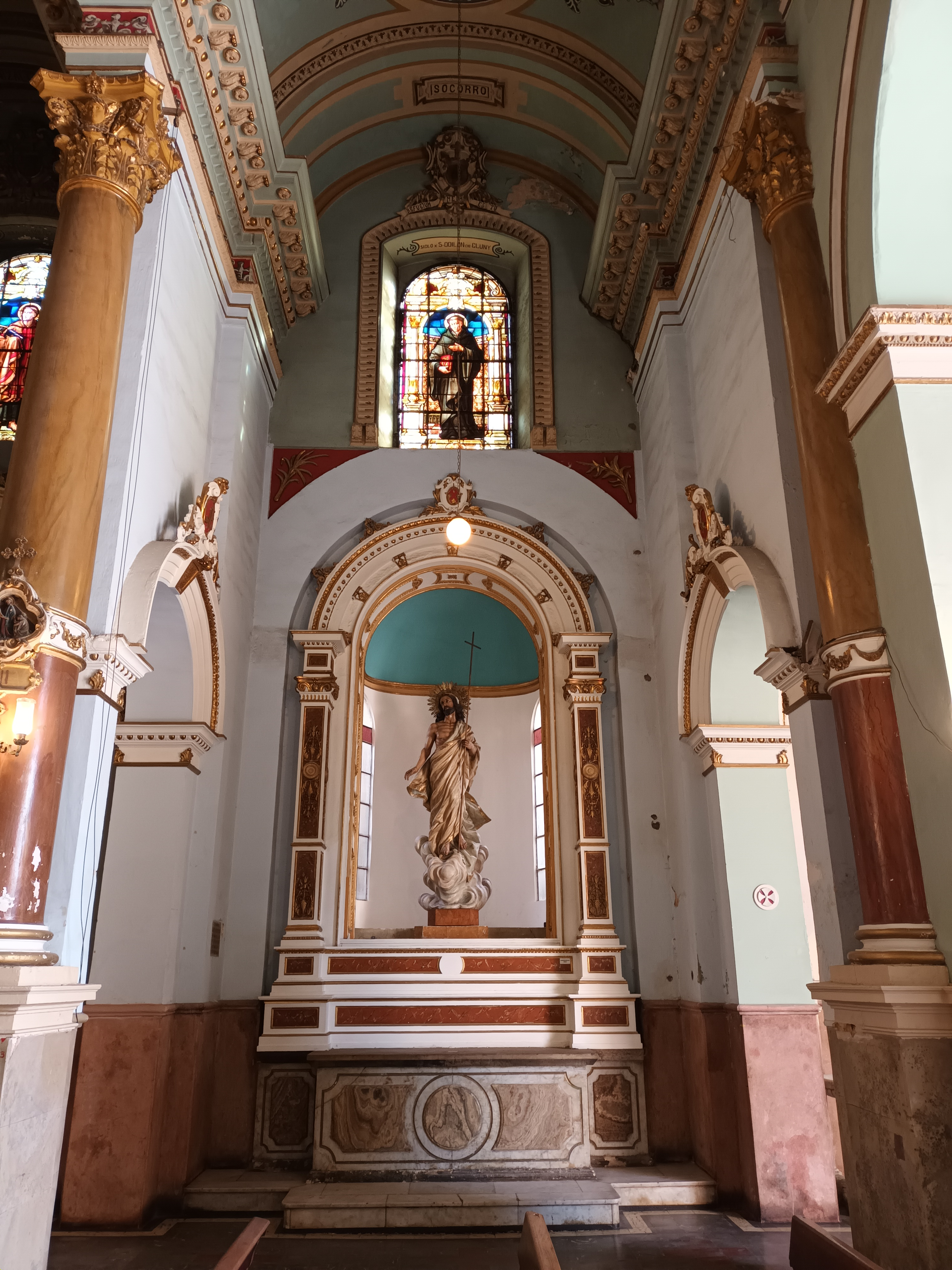
Socorro

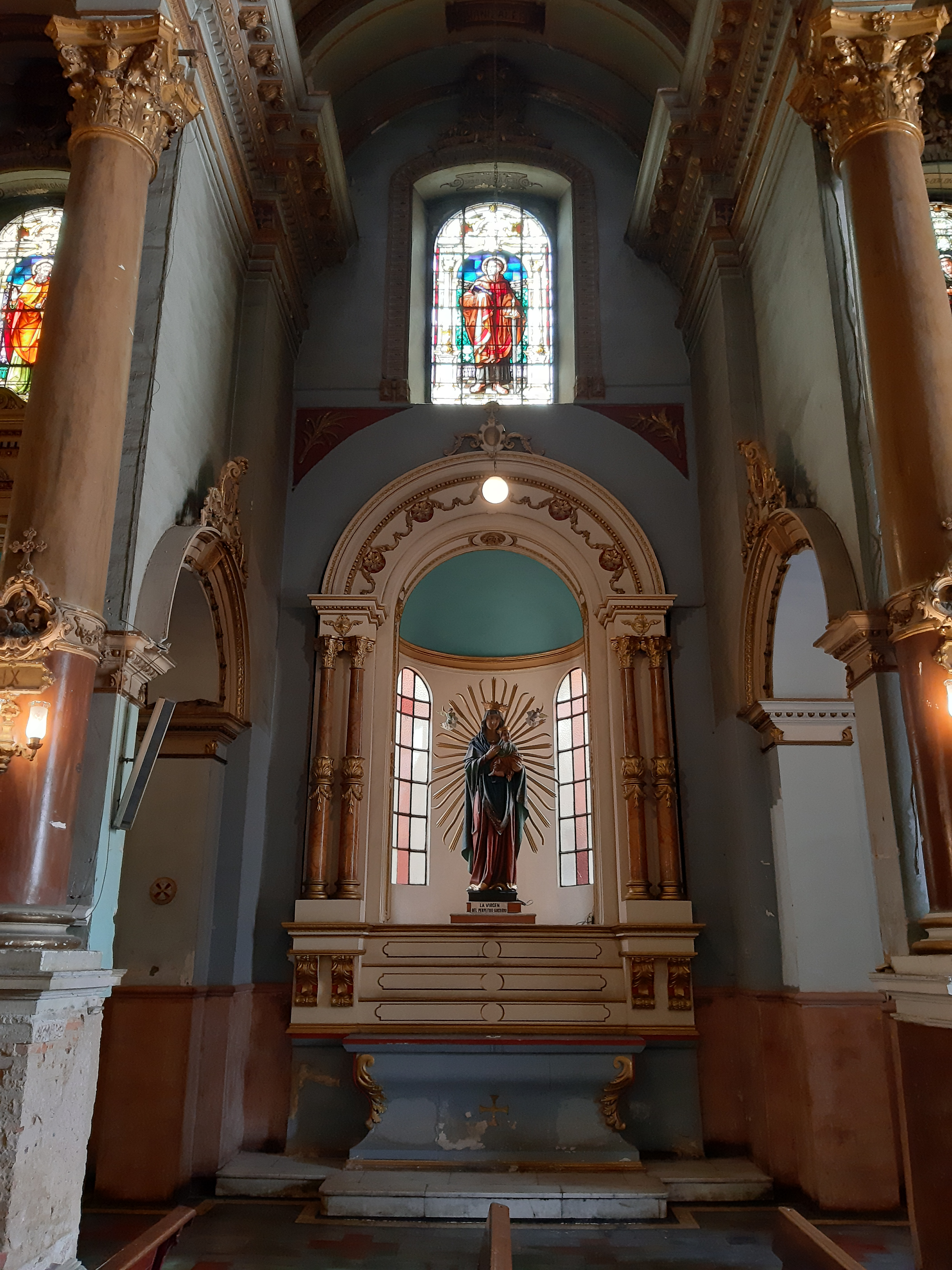
Manizales

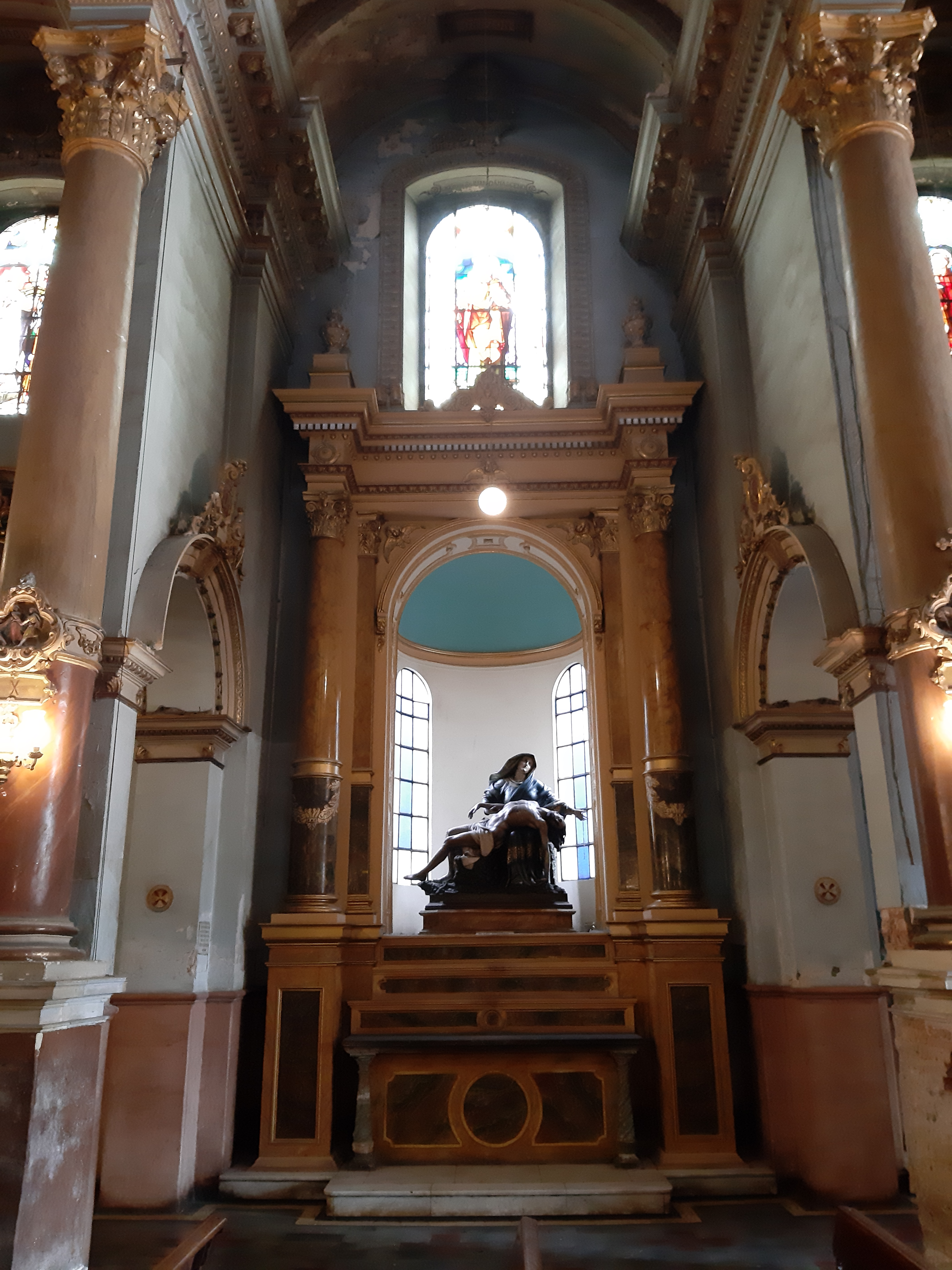
Garzón

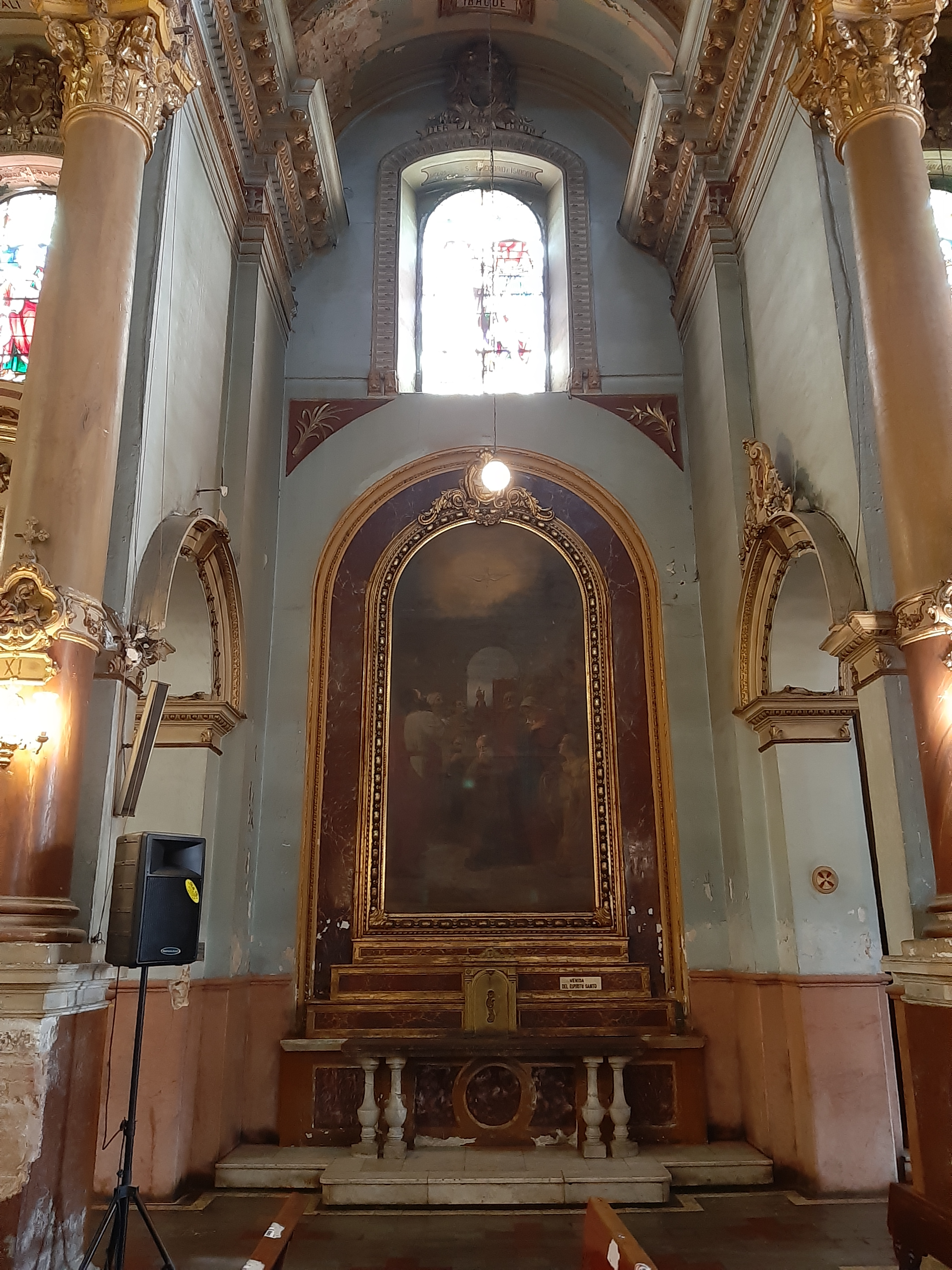
Ibagué

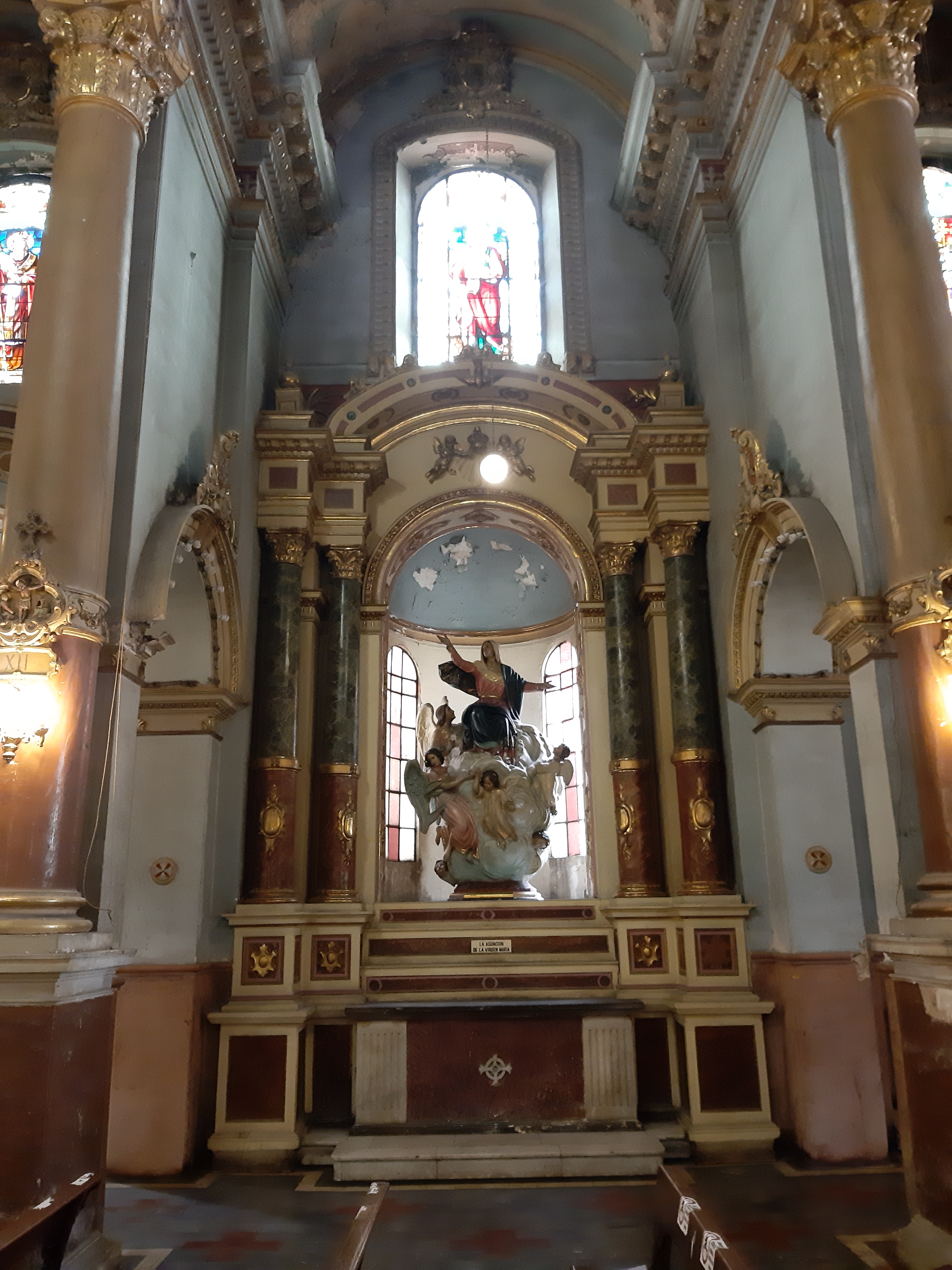
Cali

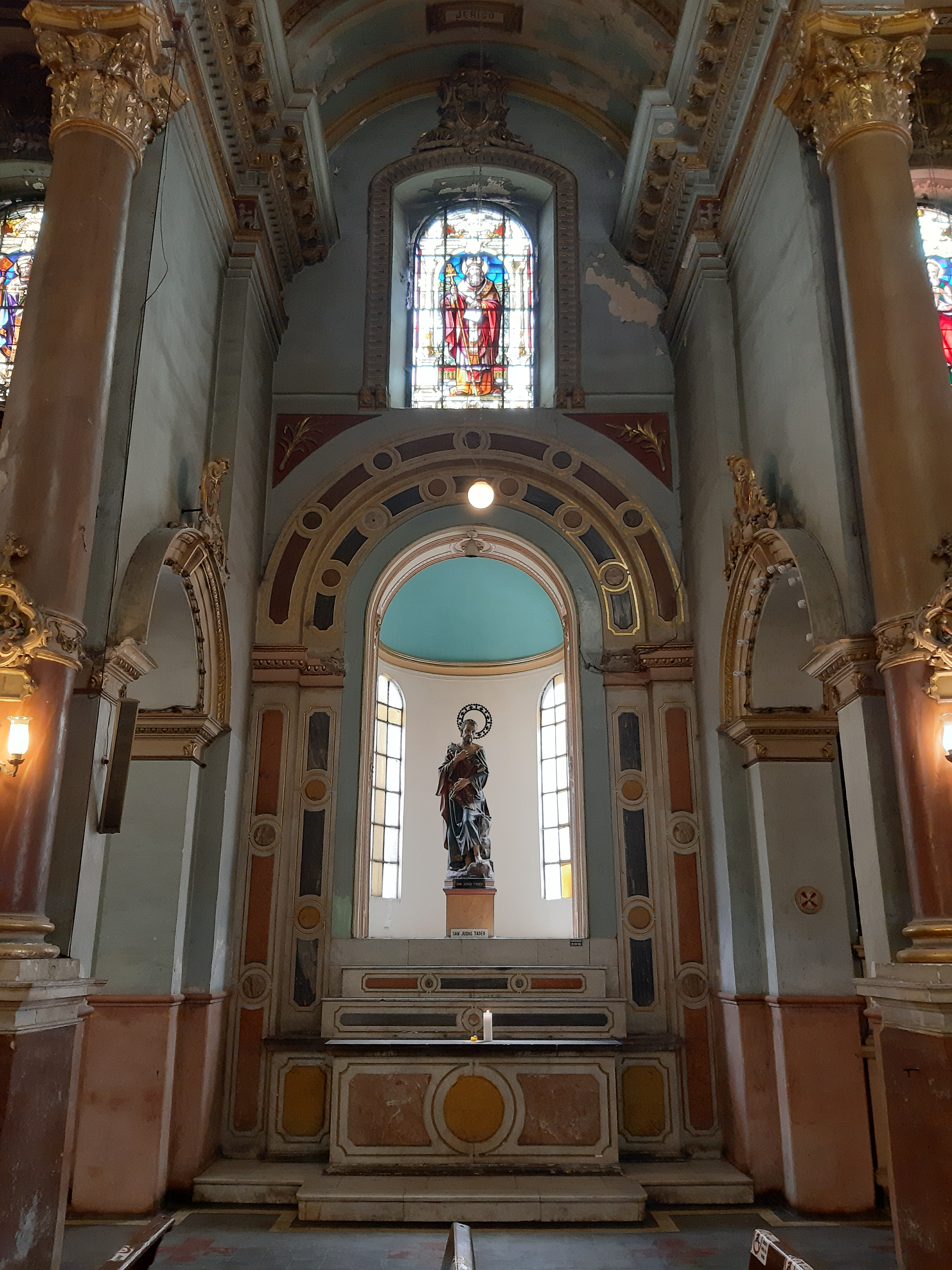
Jericó

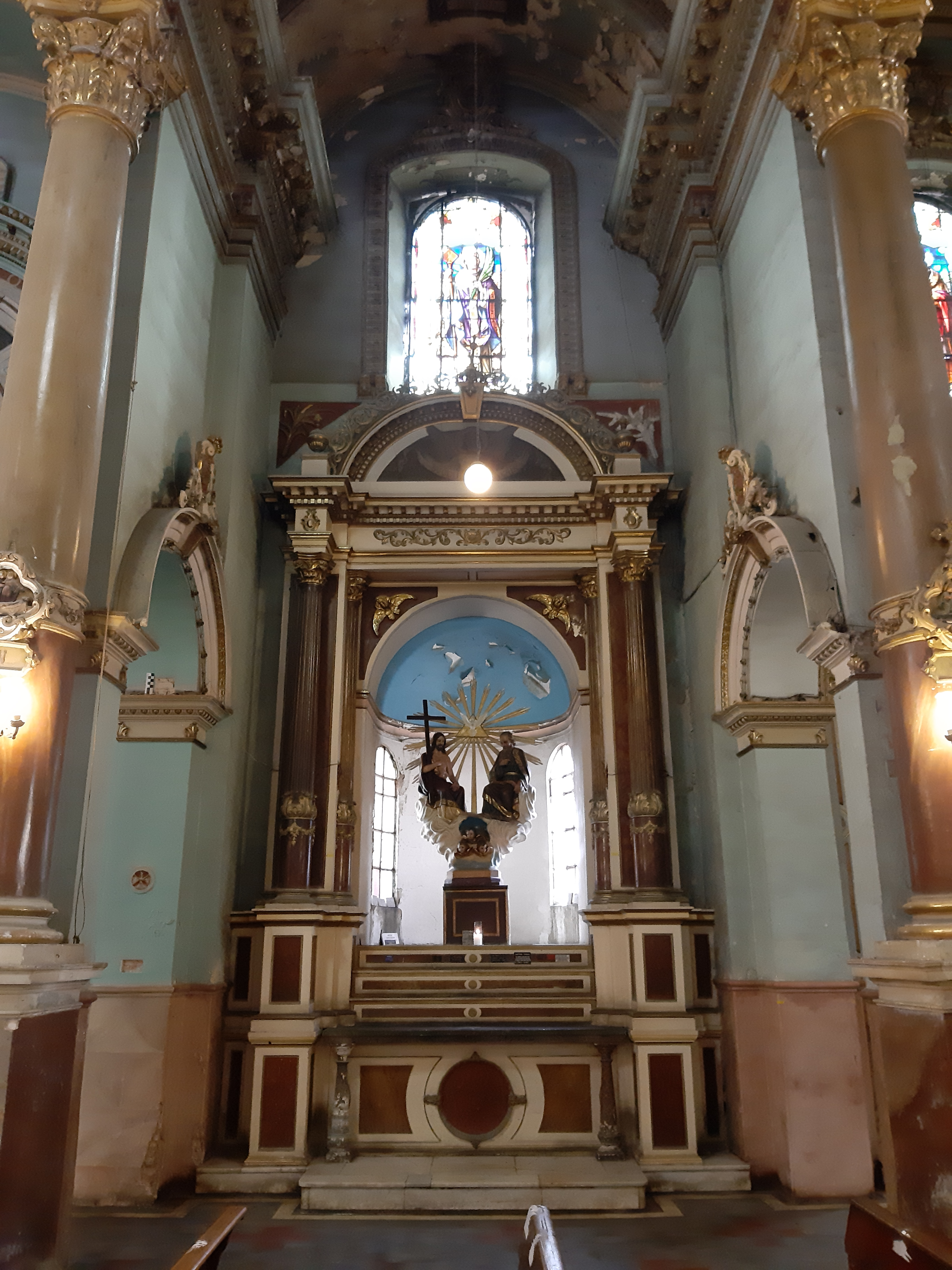
Panamá

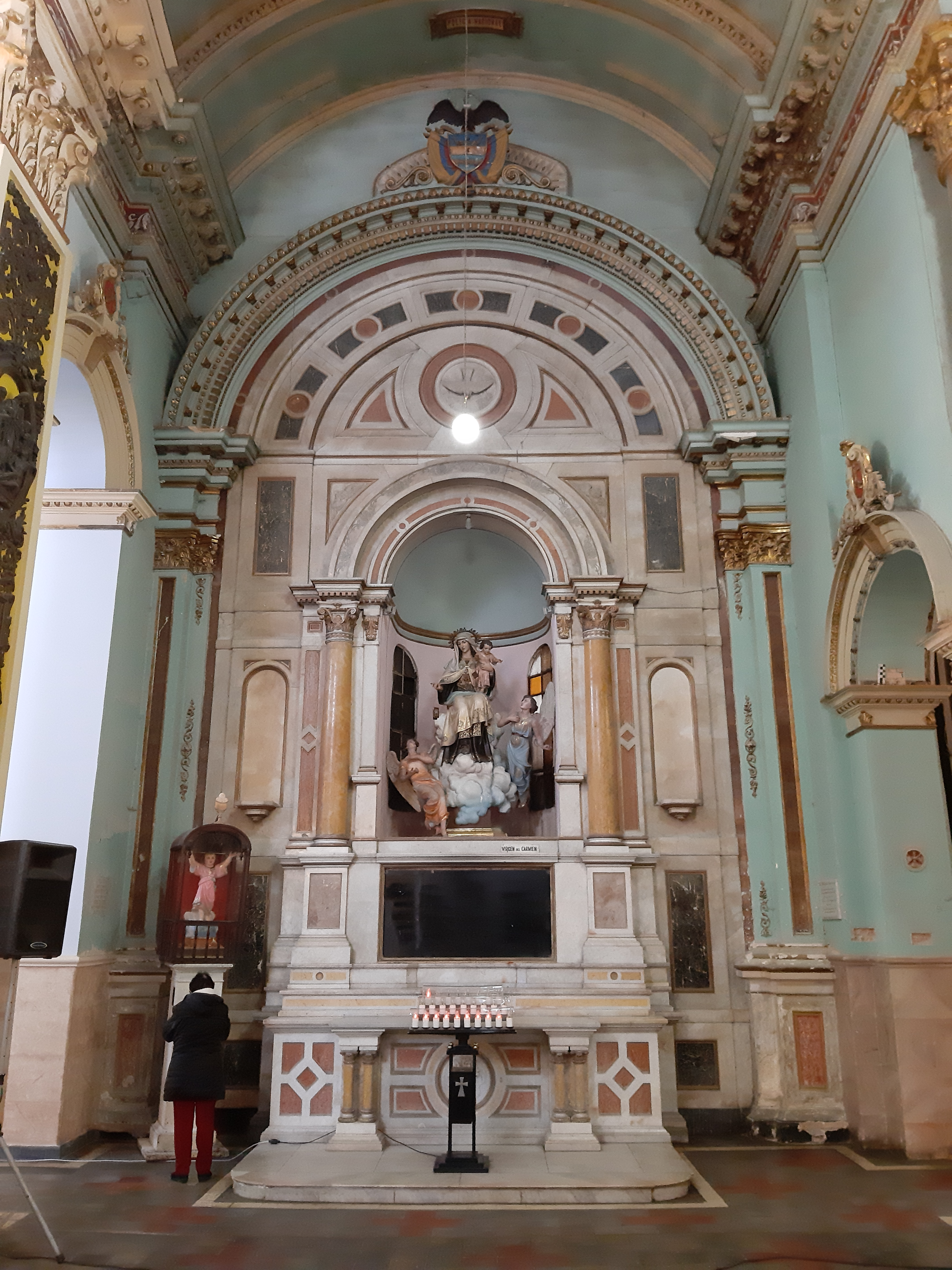
National Police

== Artistic elements ==
=== Paintings ===
==== Oil paintings ====
Between 1917 and 1920, Maestro Ricardo Acevedo Bernal designed and executed the 10 paintings done in oil on canvas, whose work had a total value of 4000 pesos paid by Fr. Pueyo de Val before his transfer as bishop of Pasto.

According to Claretian memoirs, every first Friday of the month, Acevedo came to receive communion at the Voto and during the day he would stay in the choir painting the paintings. For the 10 paintings, he charged the sum of four thousand pesos, which the Claretians themselves recognize as intrinsic, due to the great work and artistic quality of the works; it was more of a kind gesture, a gift. In 1989, on the jubilee commemoration (75 years) of the Claretian community in Colombia, Fr. Rafael María Cuéllar took the opportunity and "initiated steps to restore the beautiful paintings of Maestro Acevedo Bernal", but these steps were unsuccessful as the paintings were not restored and currently suffer from an advanced state of deterioration.

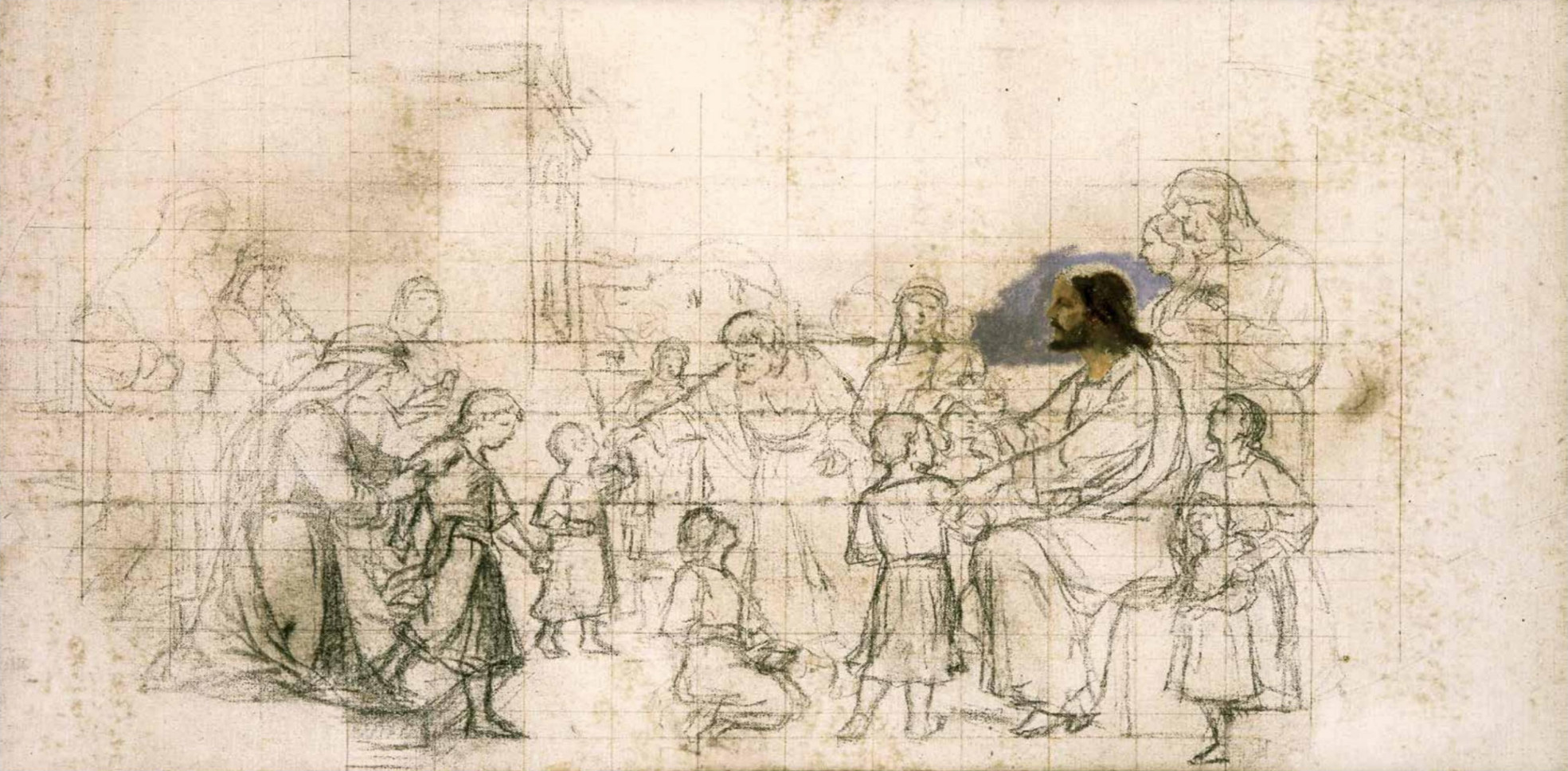
Paper sketch of the painting "Suffer the little children to come unto me" by Maestro Ricardo Acevedo Bernal.

The 10 paintings consist of the 8 large canvases adorning the ceiling of the longitudinal nave and the 2 paintings located in the Pamplona and Ibagué chapels, respectively. These works generally stand out for the religious style of the recreated scenes, which continue the guidelines of colonial art, in accordance with the canons of Catholic art treatise writers, such as Juan Interián de Ayala, who established the ways of painting scenes and standardizing religious images related both to the life of Jesus and to hagiographic paintings. This allows us to analyze how even in the 20th century, artists employed by the church, like Acevedo, continued to be guided by these norms of representation established by the Council of Trent in Europe, repeating its symbolism, colors, and attributes, and even the way of naming the iconographic themes for the works.

Artistically, it is necessary to point out the quality of the artistic work achieved in these large-format paintings, with life-size figures that accentuate the realism of the scene and a palette abundant in colors that, through the use of blue and brown tones, achieve dramatic shadows. The varnish was used locally, highlighting the difference between the planes of the work.

- The Adoration of the Magi: The work depicts the scene where the three Magi, having found Jesus by following a star, lie before him to adore him and offer him gold, frankincense, and myrrh. Here Acevedo created the work following the same guidelines of art treatise writers like Juan Interián de Ayala.
- The Holy Family: Here, Maestro Acevedo represented the Holy Family maintaining the canons of the religious scene and explicitly showing attributes of the Passion of Christ, such as the cross on which he is crucified, the crown of thorns with which he was crowned in mockery while being scourged, and the lance that pierced his side at the crucifixion.
- The Wedding at Cana: This scene describes the first miracle performed by Jesus, which took place at a wedding in Cana of Galilee attended by his mother and disciples. Maestro Acevedo followed iconographic stipulations, preserving the canons of representing the religious scene in the essence of the image, but allowed himself to vary the composition by placing Jesus in the center, with the bride and groom to his right, the groom offering three jars and a servant to the left, the other three.
- Suffer the little children to come unto me: Maestro Acevedo normally followed what was indicated in the treatises but incorporated as participating figures in the scene Fr. Otero and Msgr. Rubio y Sánchez, who stood out in the consolidation of the Claretian community in Colombia and in the construction of the Voto Nacional temple. Furthermore, "on the painter's initiative, he used children from Bogotá families as models".
- The Transfiguration of Jesus: Acevedo followed what was indicated in the treatises, including exactly the indicated figures, the radiances, and the white clothing of Jesus. The work represents the scene of Jesus and three of his apostles, Peter, James, and John, on a mountain praying. On the mountain, Jesus begins to shine with bright rays of light, then the prophets Moses and Elijah appear beside him.
- The Triumphal Entry into Jerusalem", which has a large number of figures and a richness in its composition. The work depicts the scene of the triumphal entry of Jesus into Jerusalem, which takes place in the days leading up to the Last Supper, marking the beginning of his passion. Hence, the work is the predecessor of the one that follows. This scene is recreated according to the stipulations of the Scriptures and the canons of art treatise writers, such as Juan Interián de Ayala.
- The Last Supper: The design includes preliminary work of three sketches, in which the location of the figures, the background, the proportion, and foreshortenings of the bodies varied. The work represents the scene of the Last Supper in the last days of the life of Jesus of Nazareth as narrated in the New Testament. The religious character of the scene corresponds to a classic iconographic theme recreated in Latin America since the colonial period.
- Representation of Saint Margaret Mary Alacoque and the revelation of the Sacred Heart of Jesus: The only scene among the 10 oil paintings that does not allude to an episode in the life of Jesus, but to a hagiographic event that occurred to the saint belonging to the Order of the Visitation. On 16 June 1675, Jesus appeared to Sister Margaret Mary with his heart open, and pointing with his hand to his heart, according to her testimony, said Heart was surrounded by flames, crowned with thorns, with an open wound from which blood flowed, and from the interior emerged a cross.

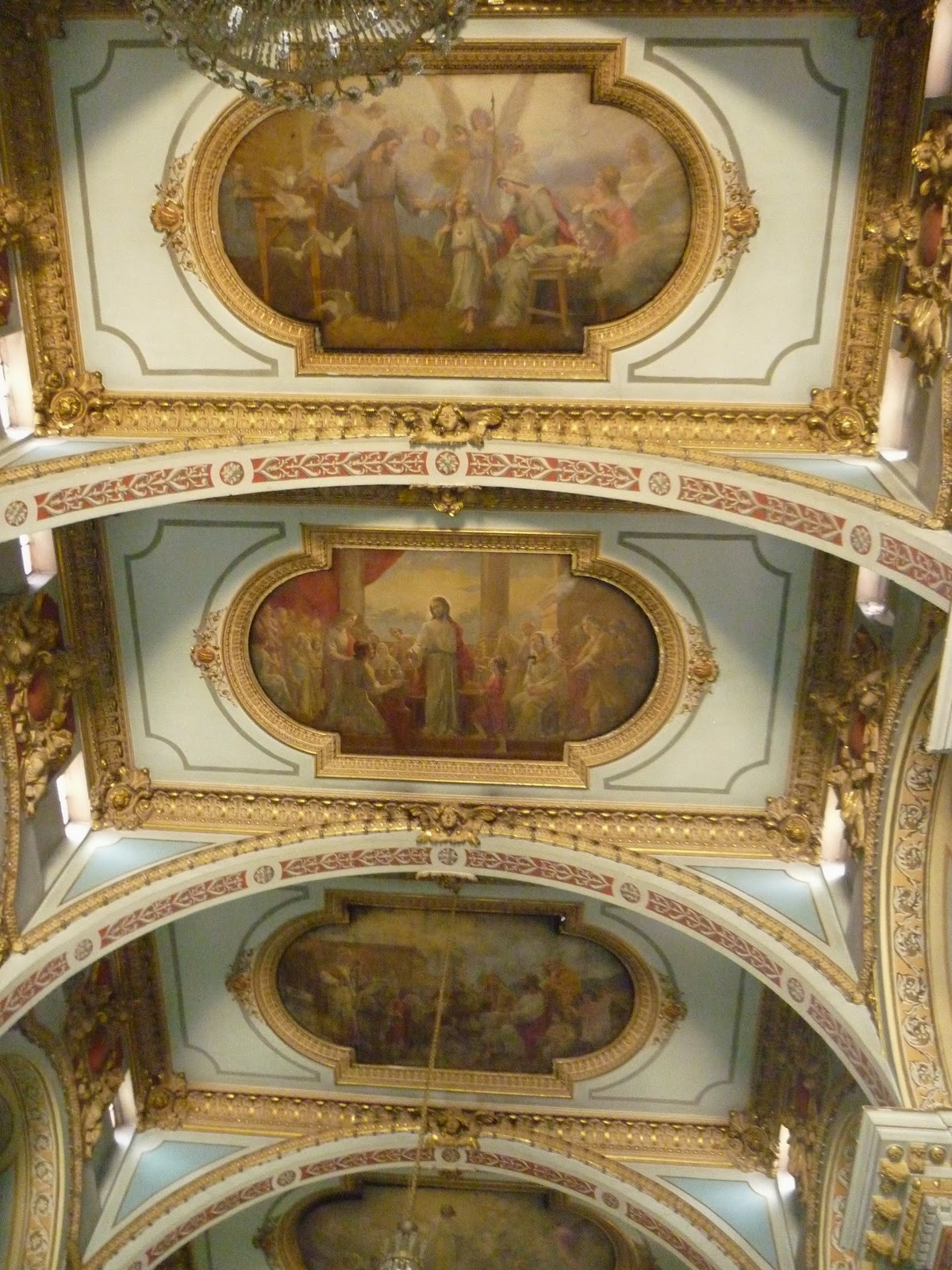
View of the paintings on the ceiling of the temple.

Vertically positioned, presiding over the chapels of Pamplona and Ibagué, are the paintings "The Prayer of Jesus in the Garden – The Agony of Gethsemane" and "The Coming of the Holy Spirit – Pentecost", also works by Maestro Acevedo. In the first, the artist continued with what was iconographically indicated by the conciliar treatise writers, but also used additional elements that help the observer link the theme with the passion of Christ, since the angel in a green mantle, besides carrying the cross, holds the crown of thorns in his right hand, which pertains to an iconographic theme called The Agony of Gethsemane.

Regarding the painting The Coming of the Holy Spirit, this scene corresponds to an iconographic theme called Pentecost, which Maestro Acevedo represents following the guidelines of art treatises. For the realization of these works, Maestro Acevedo made a preliminary study with pencil sketches, some even colored with watercolor, which were published together with the news of the installation of the paintings in the church in 1920 in Revista Cromos. These sketches help to analyze the meticulous work of proportions and metrics, the organization of the composition and its planes according to elements such as depth and perspective.

Maestro Acevedo titled the sketches of these works as follows: "For the mural painting at the Voto Nacional, Peace ushers in the century", works that, when installed on the ceiling in a horizontal position, give the appearance of mural painting. These sketches are preserved in the Graphic and Documentary Archive of the National Museum of Colombia.

==== Mural paintings ====
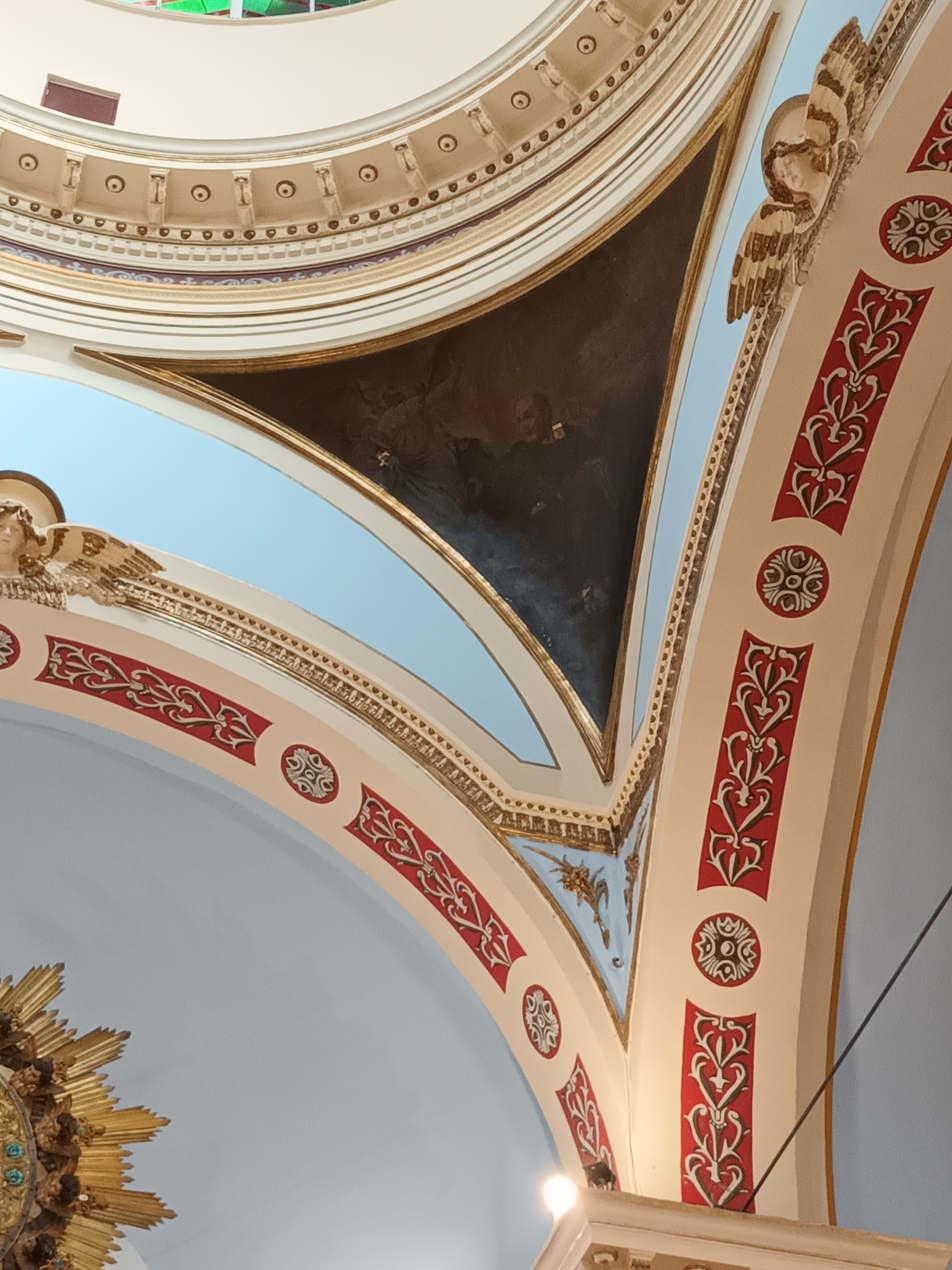
Pendentive with the image of Saint Matthew.

In the basilica, there are two groups of mural painting: the first is located on the pendentives and the second integrates the architectural spaces of the building.

The first group is located on the pendentives, below the dome drum, just above the presbytery; these are four paintings of notable artistic and aesthetic quality, as the compositions of each image have a number of elements and attributes that compose the iconographic scene of the four biblical evangelists (Matthew, Mark, Luke, and John). Unfortunately, no information has been found in the serial publications of the temple or the Claretian Community, nor even in the epistolary documents of the Claretian fathers, so the authorship of these four works is unknown, although it is presumed they were made in 1938 when the dome and transept of the Church were inaugurated.

The second group is made up of sections distributed in 28 spaces corresponding to the modules between arches and columns in the ceiling and the vaults of each chapel and the south and north arms of the transept, also including the mural painting preceding the stained glass dome vault. This mural painting is decorative, functioning by imitating moldings, thus it is a complement or visual architectural reinforcement that enriches the different architectural spaces of the temple through a design of geometric figures and phytomorphic motifs, combined with a color palette, replicated along the walls, ceiling, and vaults with details that adjust to the specific forms of each area. It also accentuates the religious symbolism of the temple. The author of the decorative mural painting is the artist Colombo Ramelli, of the Ramelli workshop.

In general, more than 60% of the mural painting has been intervened on different occasions, a fact corroborated by the mural study carried out in 2012 through the elaboration of stratigraphic test pits. (Note: A stratigraphic test pit is the analysis of the background of materials that have been part of a building for years; it could be said that they are the layers of paint, varnish, or construction material that a wall, railing, balcony, or other building components possess. Through this analysis, the history of the changes the building to be restored underwent can be known.)

=== Sculptures ===
==== Façade sculptures ====
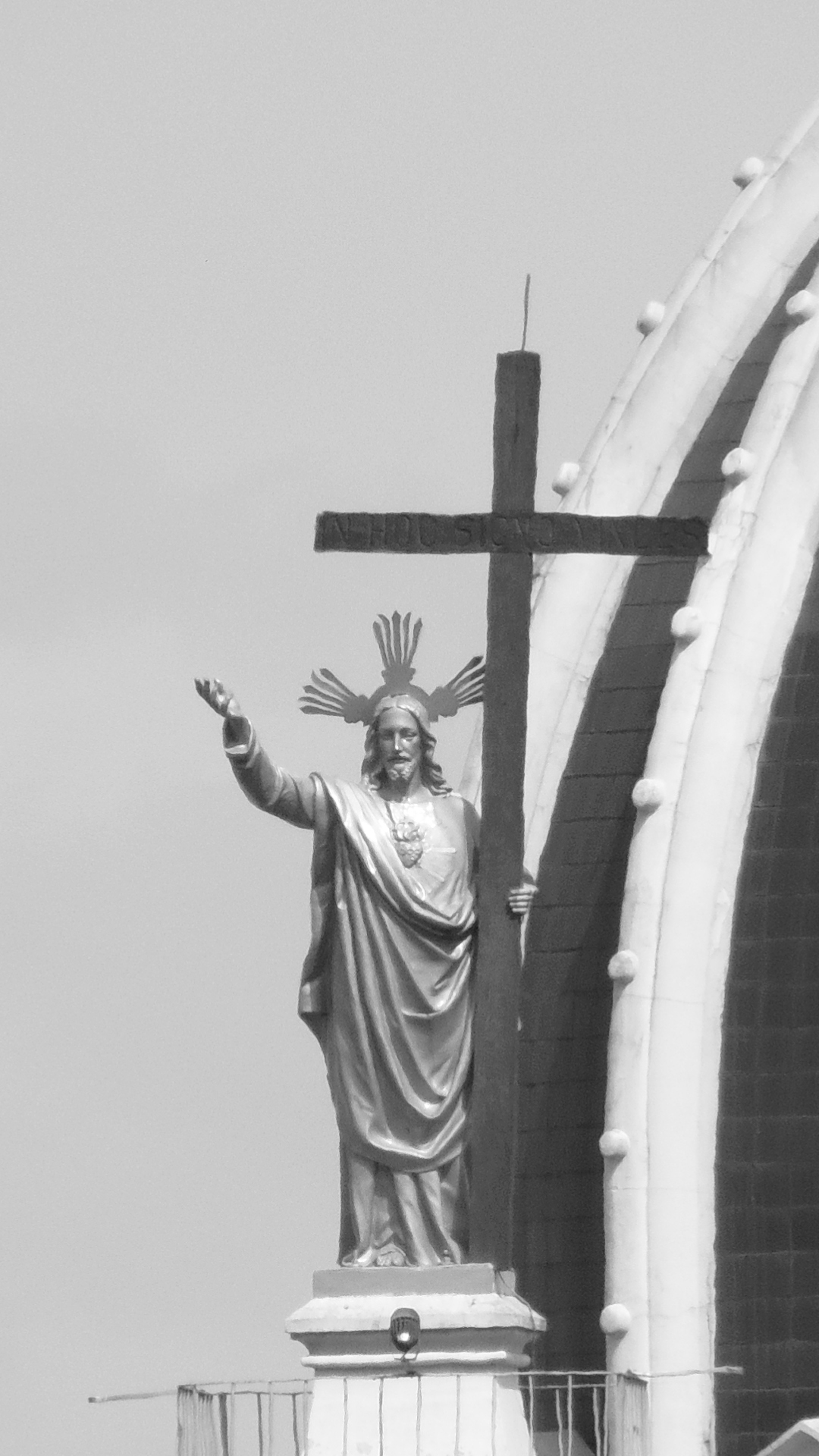
Left. Statue of the Sacred Heart of Jesus; in his left hand he holds a wooden cross.

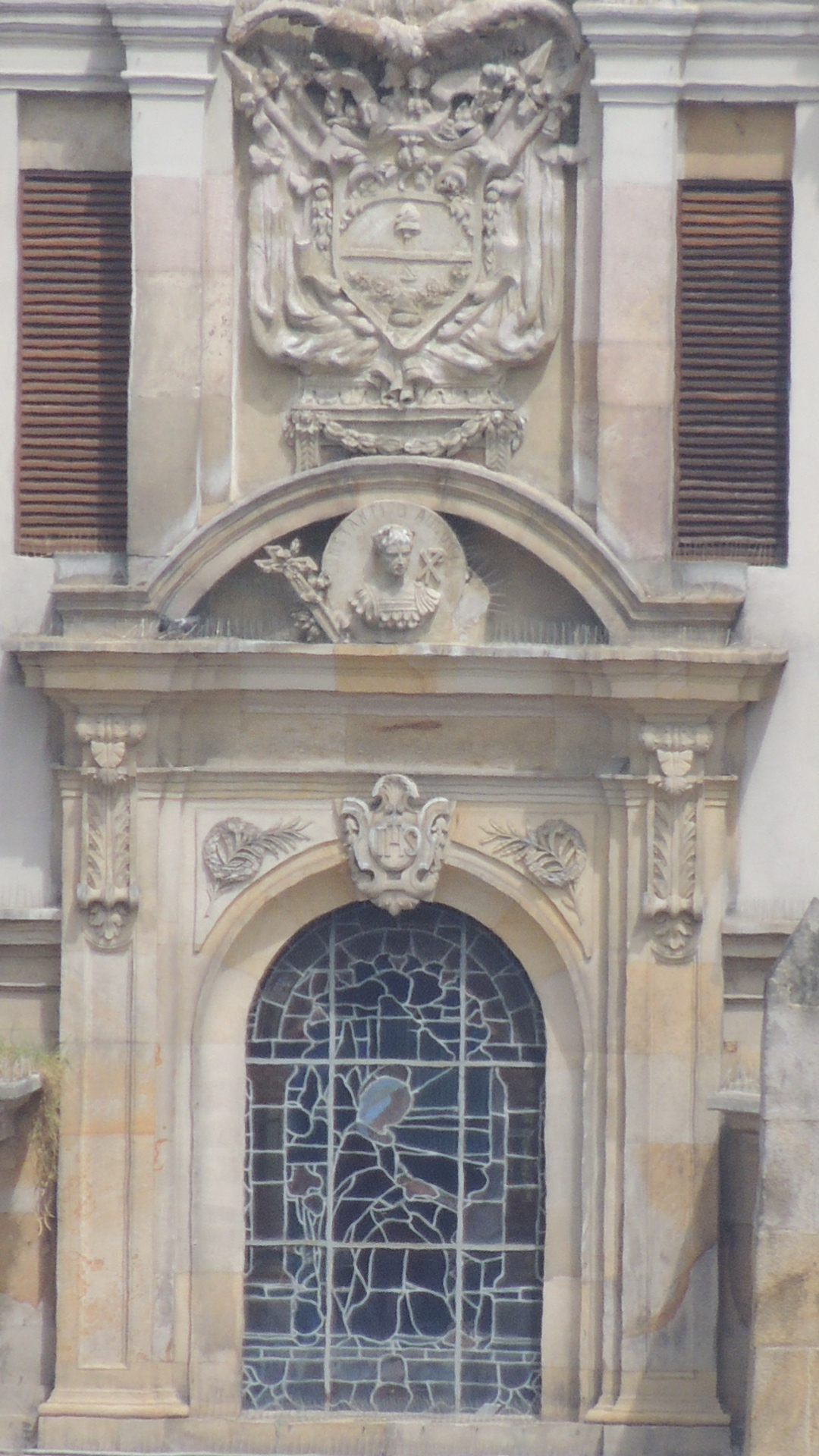
Right. From top to bottom, coat of arms of the Republic of Colombia, medallion of Constantine I, and the small shield with the letters IHS, monogram of Jesus.

The temple's façade is adorned by a sculptural ensemble divided into three groups corresponding to: 1) statues, 2) shields, and 3) decorative elements attached to the façade.

The statues are a group of 5 elements, which are important works on the façade because they are unique and original works. The dominant element is a cast iron sculpture with a gilded finish of Jesus standing in a victorious pose, raising his right hand and holding a wooden cross in his left hand, on the horizontal crossbeam of which is the Latin phrase "In hoc signo vinces" (by this sign you will conquer), and on his chest he displays a flaming heart wrapped in a crown of thorns. The statue is at the top of the façade and was blessed and installed on 8 December 1913 in a pompous ceremony. There is also a set of four statues made of cast cement with an iron frame inside, corresponding to different American saints (Saint Rose of Lima, Saint Turibius, Saint Louis Bertrand, and Saint Peter Claver), designed by Ricardo Acevedo Bernal and made by the Argentine sculptor Juan C. Atehortúa. The statues of Saint Turibius, Saint Louis Bertrand, and Saint Peter Claver were delivered and installed in 1914, and that of Saint Rose of Lima was installed in 1915. Atehortúa was a graduate of the National School of fine arts, where he surely had contact with Maestro Acevedo Bernal and with the ornamentation work of the Ramellis.

These saints were related to the Viceroyalty of Peru and the Viceroyalty of New Granada, and iconographically show relevance as part of the façade decoration, insofar as they reinforce the idea of a distinct (American) religious language that complements the figure of the victorious Jesus as the central theme of the entire Voto Nacional, which is positioned above (literally and metaphorically) all the saints on the façade. It is noteworthy that the location of the American saints on the two sides of the façade, on the two upper levels, serves as a frame of reference for the central decorative element: the coat of arms of Colombia. In that sense, with Christ at the top, the four American saints protect and guard the Republic of Colombia.

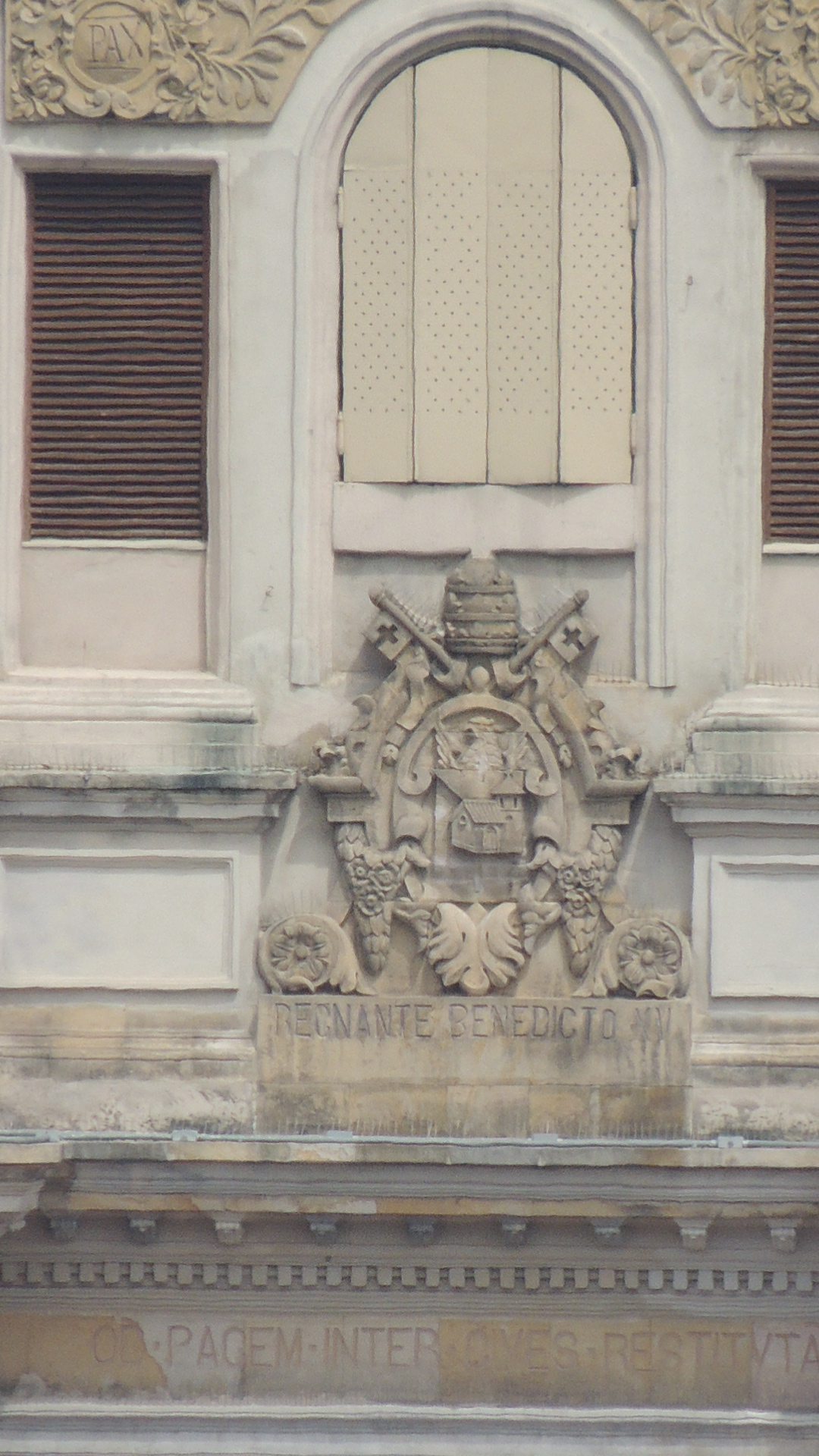
Coat of arms of Pope Benedict XV.

Likewise, on the façade, there is a group of shields sculpted in stone or cement corresponding to those of the Republic of Colombia, of Pope Benedict XV, of Archbishop Bernardo Herrera Restrepo, and of the Claretians, in addition to the medallion of Constantine Augustus and a small shield with the letters IHS, a monogram of Jesus. These elements were apparently made at the same time as the initial construction of the façade, between 1913 and 1915. The author of these carvings is unknown, although the coat of arms of Colombia and the medallion of Constantine Augustus were designed by Ricardo Acevedo Bernal, made of cement and sand mortar with a stone-like finish, and executed by the D'Achiardi workshop, directed by Pedro Julio D'Achiardi, an Italian sculptor and ornamenter who settled in Colombia at the end of the 19th century and participated around 1926 in the remodeling of the Ibagué Cathedral.

The coat of arms of Colombia has a cross at the top from which rays emanate, and in its center is a heart corresponding to the iconography of the Sacred Heart of Jesus. The shield together with the cross is 1.96 m high. At the bottom of said shield appears the manufacturer's inscription "TALLERES D'ACHIARDI".

This coat of arms of Colombia is the central element in the decoration of the façade, not only because of its literal location in the center of the second body, but also on a symbolic level for representing the Colombian homeland, consecrated to the Sacred Heart of Jesus, the objective and supreme act that Archbishop Bernardo Herrera Restrepo proposed with the Voto Nacional.

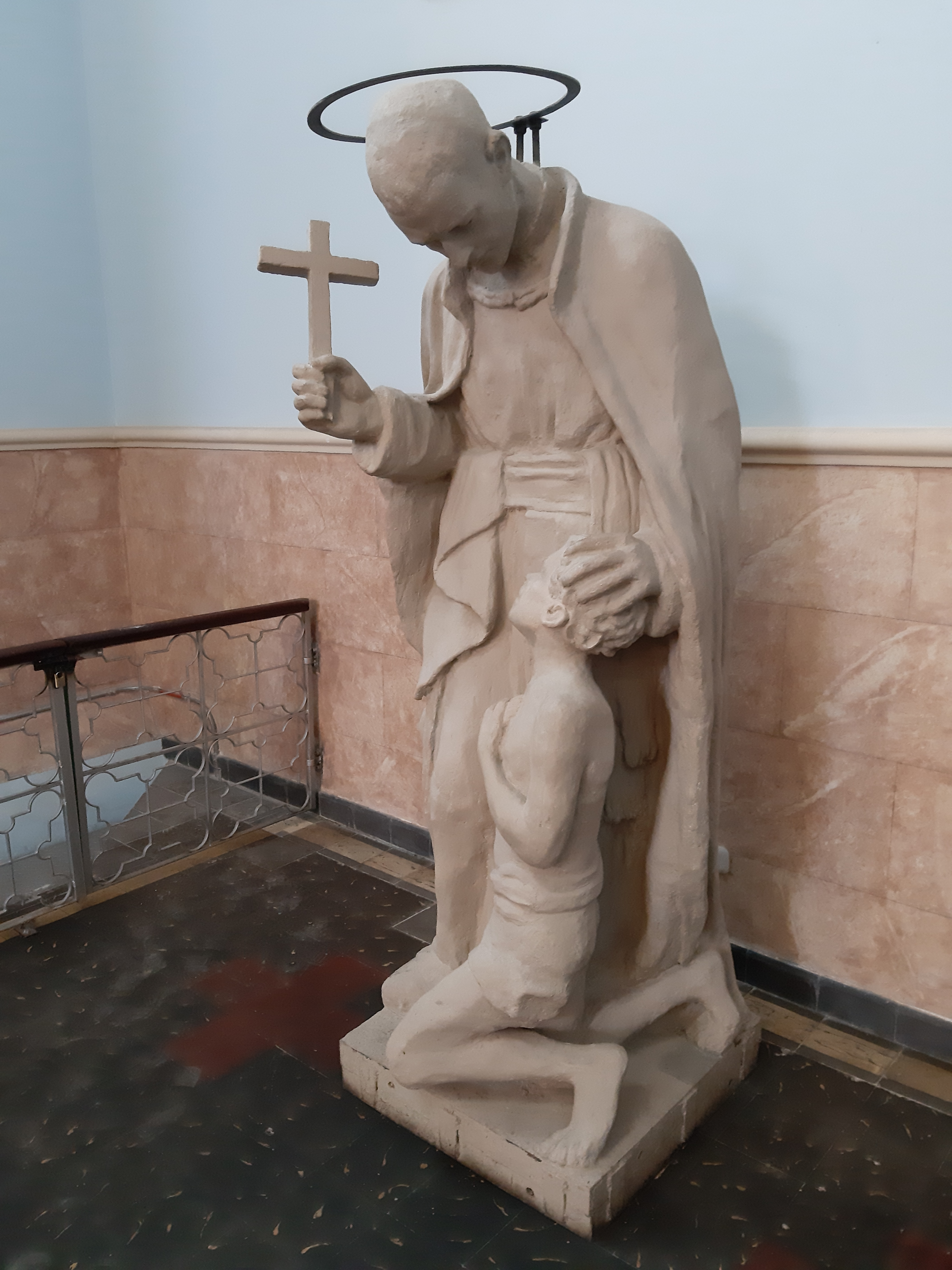
Replica of the statue of Saint Peter Claver on the façade.

The interplay of Catholic symbols, such as the four American saints, complements the message by framing this shield. Below and more discreetly, a medallion of Constantine Augustus (Flavius Valerius Constantinus) is observed, who was a Roman emperor and the first to grant freedom of worship to Christianity. The image of Constantine is a direct allegory to the union of politics and religion, thus reinforcing the language of the entire ensemble.

Also noteworthy from this group are the ecclesiastical shields, which are a decorative exaltation to honor the memory of the promoters and builders of the temple. On the south side is the episcopal coat of arms of Archbishop Bernardo Herrera, author of the Voto Nacional pastoral letter, indicating his important role in the conceptualization of the temple and his personal decision to execute it. On the north side is the coat of arms of the Claretians, the religious order that took charge of the temple's construction and currently guards it. At the top, where the third body begins, is the coat of arms of Pope Benedict XV, during whose pontificate (1914–1922) the Voto Nacional temple was consecrated. These ecclesiastical shields, including the small shield with the IHS monogram, are sculpted in sandstone.

Finally, there are the decorative elements attached to the façade, such as the moldings and capitals. The author of the carvings of these elements is unknown, although it is possible they were also the work of the D'Achiardi workshop, especially the capitals due to the characteristics of the materials, as these are made of cement and plaster with a stone-like finish. This façade was the one Fr. Pueyo designed with the help of Maestro Acevedo Bernal.

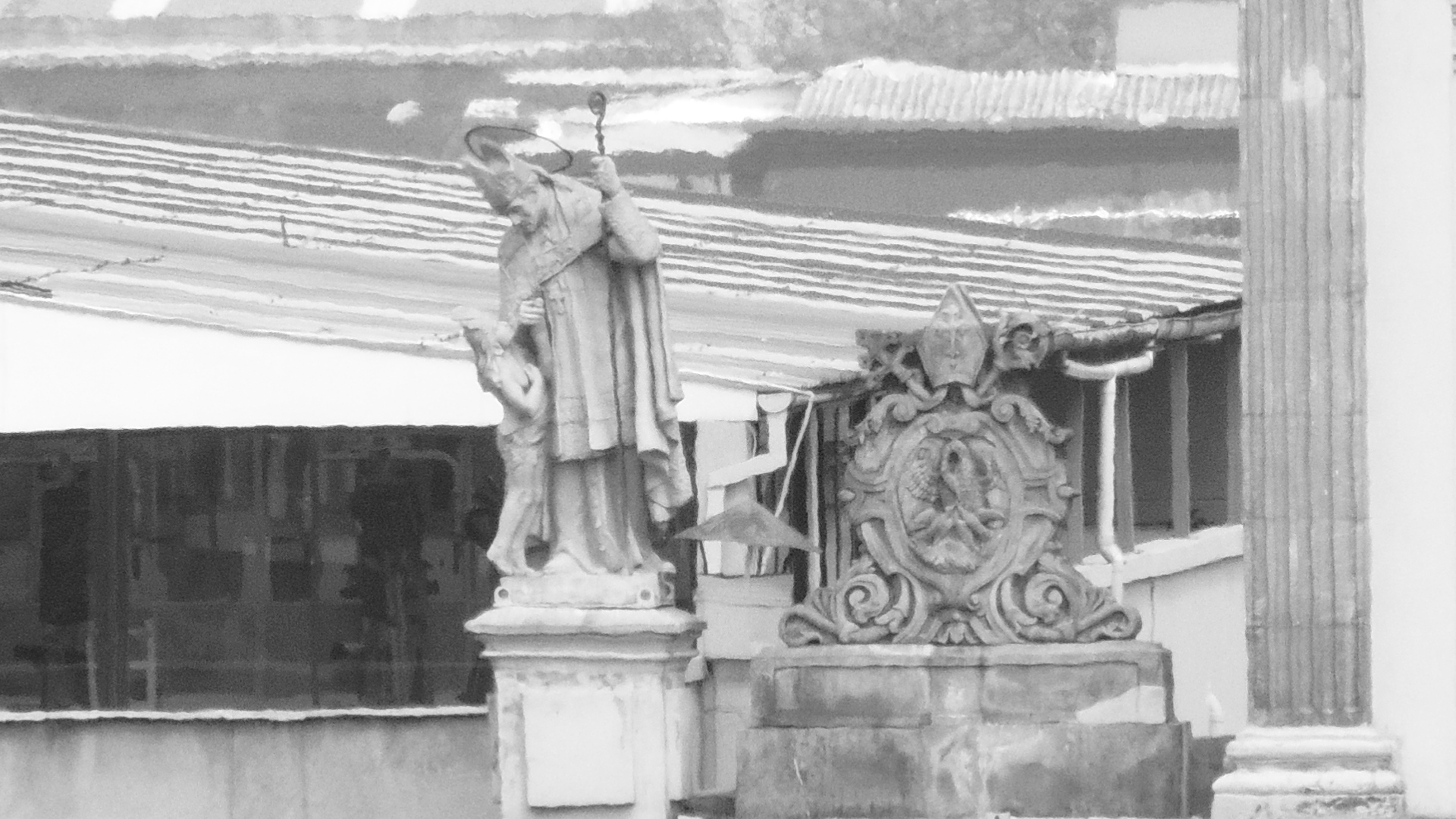
Statue of Saint Turibius, Archbishop of Lima, and the coat of arms of Archbishop Bernardo Herrera Restrepo.

The central door of the façade is decorated with cast bronze pieces. On each leaf of the central door, there are 12 quarterfoils of equal proportions, framed by a simple gilded molding, in the center of each is a trefoiled cross with equal arms. In the corners of each quatrefoil is a fleur-de-lis containing the word PAX, peace in Latin. These fleurs-de-lis are placed in such a way that they point to the trefoiled cross, indicating that peace is in Christ, as indicated by several references in the Bible, such as the Gospel of John (14:27-31), when Jesus says: "Peace I leave with you; my peace I give you".

On the mullions separating the quatrefoils, there are alternating open pomegranates in which their red seeds can be seen, and five-pointed radiant stars (associated with the military world). Also, between the upper mullions are the coat of arms of Colombia (north leaf) and a mantle with a royal crown (south leaf) containing a flaming heart wrapped in a crown of thorns surrounded by olive branches.

The pomegranate is a fruit found on the coats of arms of Colombia and Bogotá; it is also a reference to New Granada (the old name of Colombia). In heraldry, the pomegranate is a symbol of concord and unity. From all these decorative elements, a clear political-religious content is read, in accordance with the language of the entire temple.

Although there are no direct references to these decorative pieces, the possibility that they are part of the initial design of the façade is suggested by old photos in which these pieces are visible. Even so, the author of these elements is unknown, or whether they were designed with the mediation of Maestro Ricardo Acevedo Bernal or Colombo Ramelli.

Before the restoration of the façade, the sculptures presented serious conservation problems, due on the one hand to their manufacturing technique and on the other, to their prolonged exposure to a polluted environment due to being located outdoors.

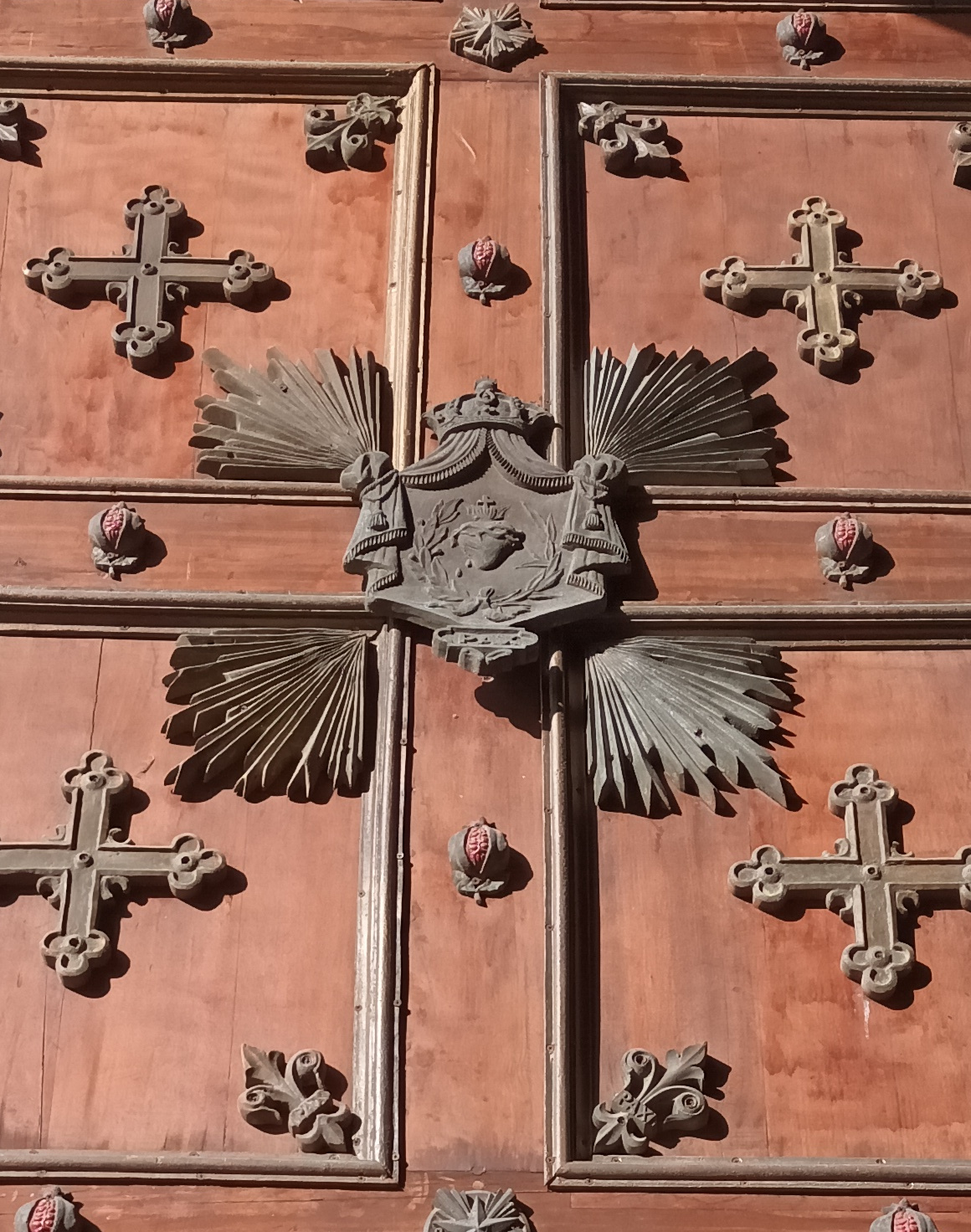
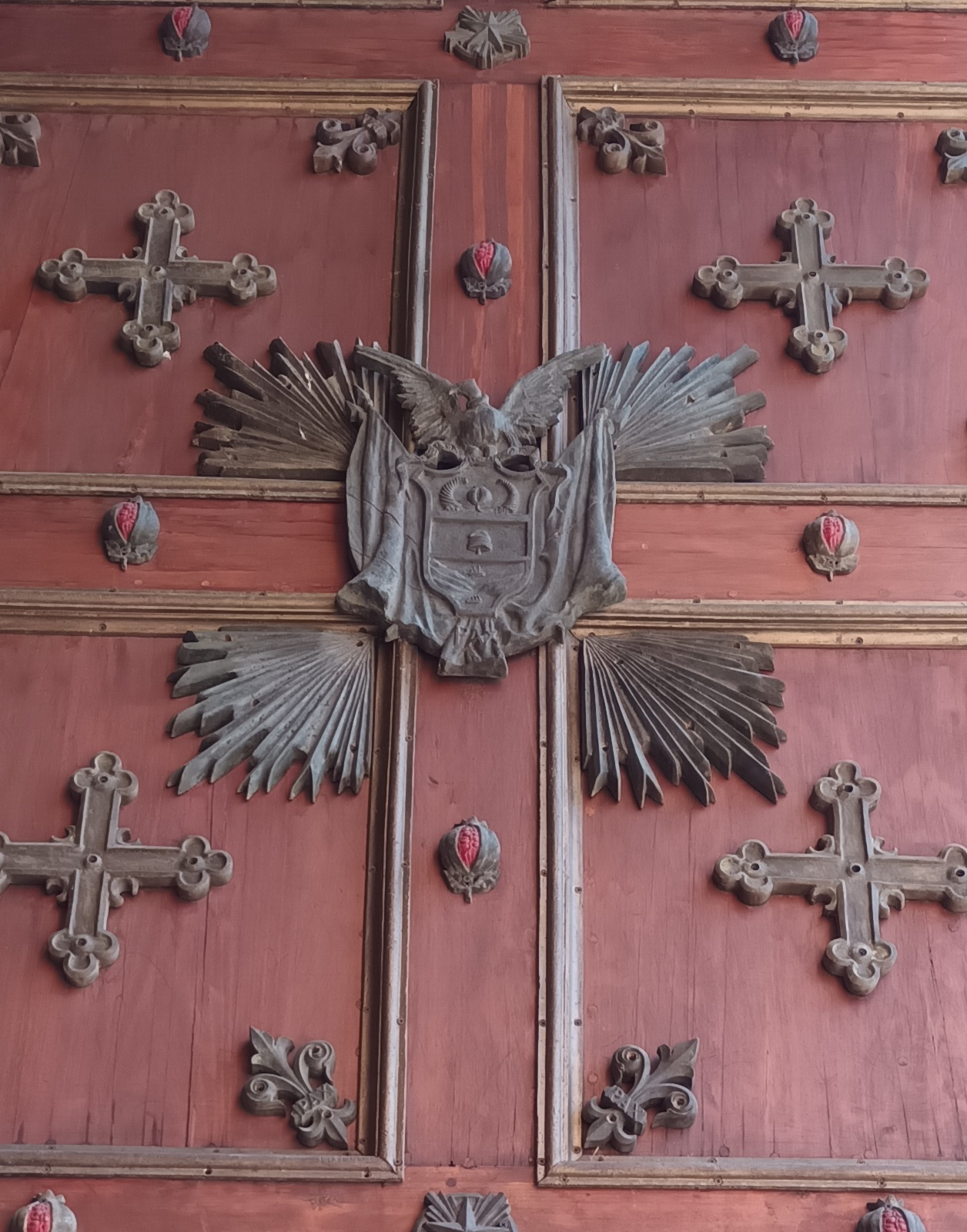
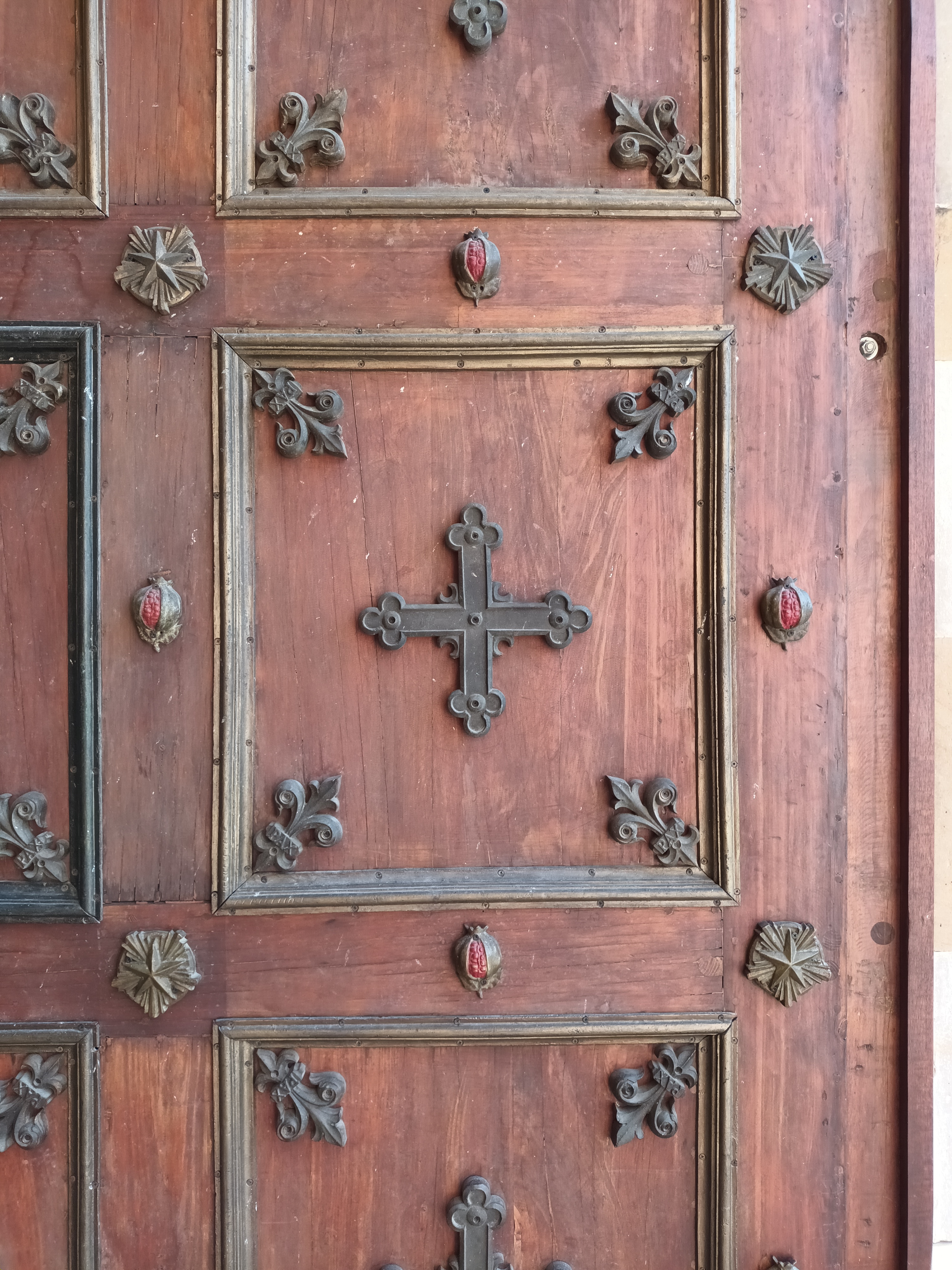
Bronze pieces on the central door. Left: Mantle containing the flaming heart (Sacred Heart of Jesus) (south leaf). Center: Coat of arms of the Republic of Colombia (north leaf). Right: In the center of the quatrefoil is a trefoiled cross with equal arms, and in each corner is a fleur-de-lis. On the mullions separating the quatrefoils, there are alternating five-pointed radiant stars and open pomegranates in which their red seeds can be seen.

Of these, the statues of Saint Peter Claver and Saint Louis Bertrand were the most affected, presenting cracking and fracturing of the cement; these cracks also allowed corrosion of the internal metal. For example, the sculpture of Saint Louis Bertrand had a missing piece in the central part that created a cavity that served as a pigeon nest and, in the medium term, could lead to structural failure.

The other two statues, Saint Turibius and Saint Rose of Lima, suffered superficial deterioration caused by weathering conditions and deterioration of the paint layer. They presented black stains associated with environmental pollution by sulfur dioxide together with biological growth and colonization, which were causing green stains, affecting the sculptures and their characteristics.

Something similar occurred with the shields and other decorative elements, which, besides black stains, presented an exaggerated amount of accumulated dirt caused by pigeon droppings.

The iron statue of Jesus showed corrosion and abrasion. Traces of a red layer that was part of an anti-corrosive coating were also found; it is unknown if the state of the work at that time was part of an alteration process caused by the environment or if it was subjected to an inadequate cleaning process that eliminated the original patinas or coatings. The Claretian memoirs mention that the image, apparently imported from Germany, is "gilded bronze", so it is possible that the gilding was its original color. The central door presented dirt, graffiti, and multiple missing bronze pieces due to theft and vandalism. For example, the mantle-shaped piece containing the flaming heart is slightly raised at the bottom due to a theft attempt in which they tried to tear it off the door.

==== Permanently exhibited sculptures inside ====
The sculptures permanently exhibited inside the temple are an important sample of 20th-century imagery, brought from different parts of Europe, especially Spain and Portugal, a provenance indicated by marks or signatures inscribed on each of these works. This sculptural collection preserved today in the basilica is the result of the efforts of the Claretian priests and various donors who contacted renowned art houses or importers of artistic works from Europe to Bogotá.

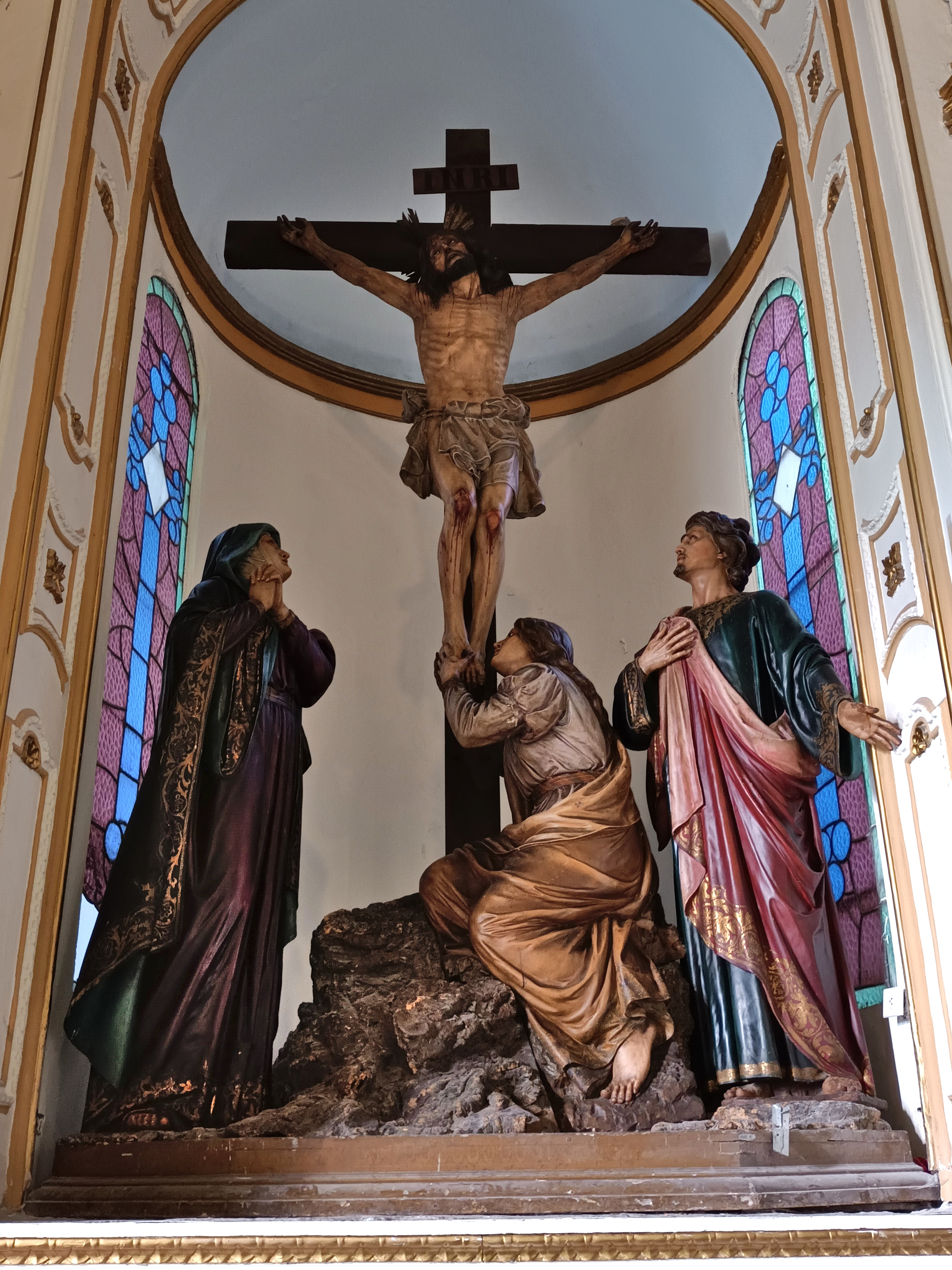
Left. Crucified Jesus.

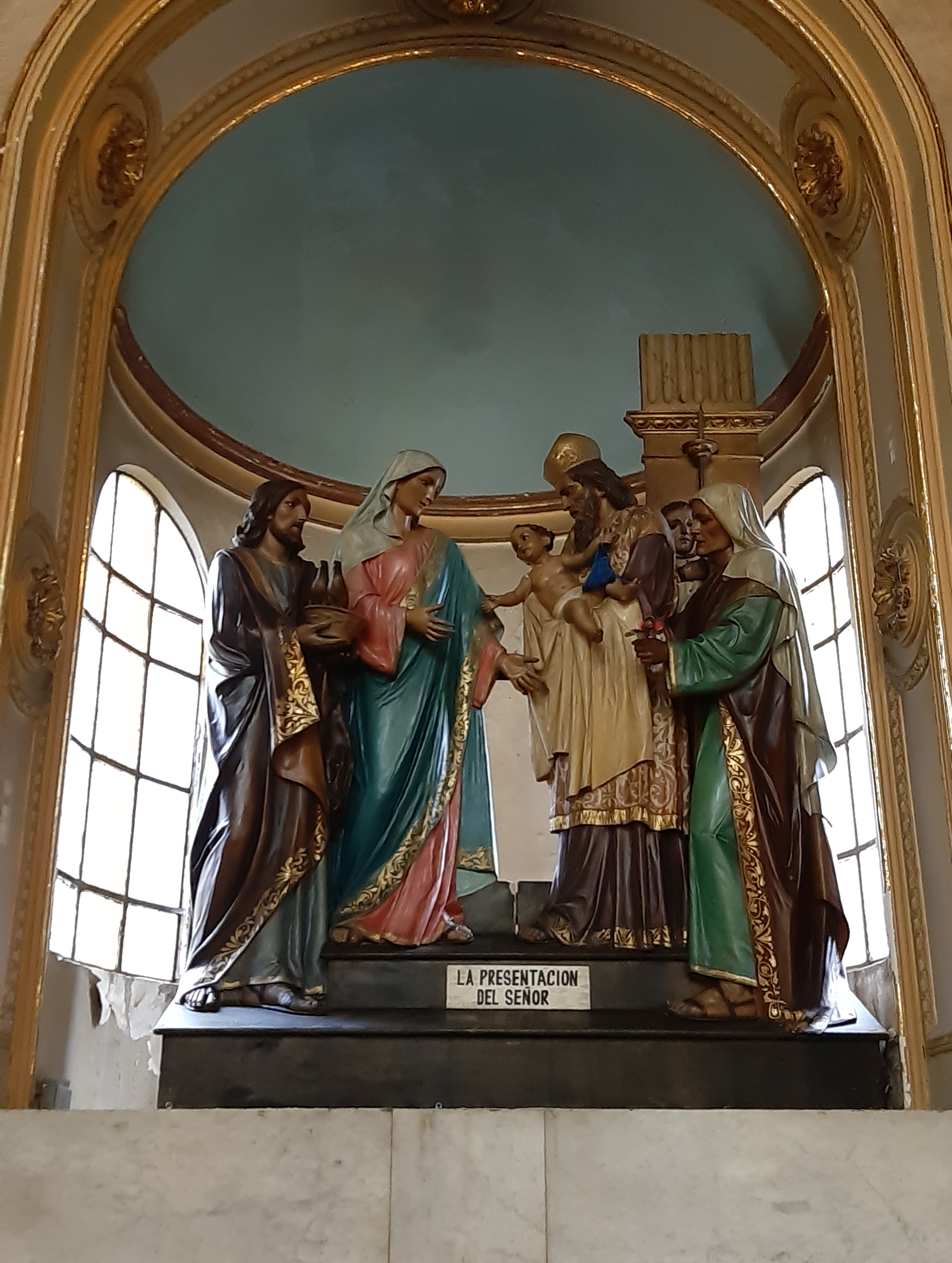
Right. The Presentation of the Child Jesus. Sculptures made by the "Talleres Candela" of Valencia.

According to historical records that are still preserved, several sculptures were contracted in 1919 directly by Fr. Pueyo de Val with the businessman José Candela Albert, from the city of Valencia, Spain: the Crucifixion, that of Carmen, that of the Presentation of the Child Jesus, and that of the Angustias. These works were made thanks to the collection of silver items donated by the faithful, organized in the Temple, and with which the businessman was paid.

Mostly, the Candela workshop made its sculptures in carved and polychromed wood, with gold leaf and glass eyes. In some works, the least intervened, the following inscription can be seen: "Fábrica de Ornamentos. Talleres de escultura. José Candela Albert. Santo Tomás 18 Valencia, España"; and they are currently located in the Tunja, Manizales, Medellín, and Garzón chapels. The sculpture of the Virgin of Angustias or of Sorrows appears in several publications of the time and in photographs of Holy Week processions.

Likewise, Fr. Martín Jové commissioned in that same year (1919) from "Casa Rius" in Barcelona, Spain, other images, which were: those of the Heart of Mary, Saint Joseph, and Perpetual Help, costing 3,000 pesos. In addition, the sculptural group of the Assumption made by the same house, currently located in the Cali chapel, also arrived in 1919, which was made of carved, polychromed wood, with gold leaf, and also commissioned by Fr. Jové, who paid 1,500 pesos for it. The group was blessed on 12 July 1919 by Msgr. Antonio María Pueyo.

A few years later, the images of Saint Joachim and Saint Anne would arrive, also made by Casa Rius and likewise paid for by Fr. Jové. The sculptures made by Casa Rius are marked with the signature of the different artists who made them and with the corresponding date.

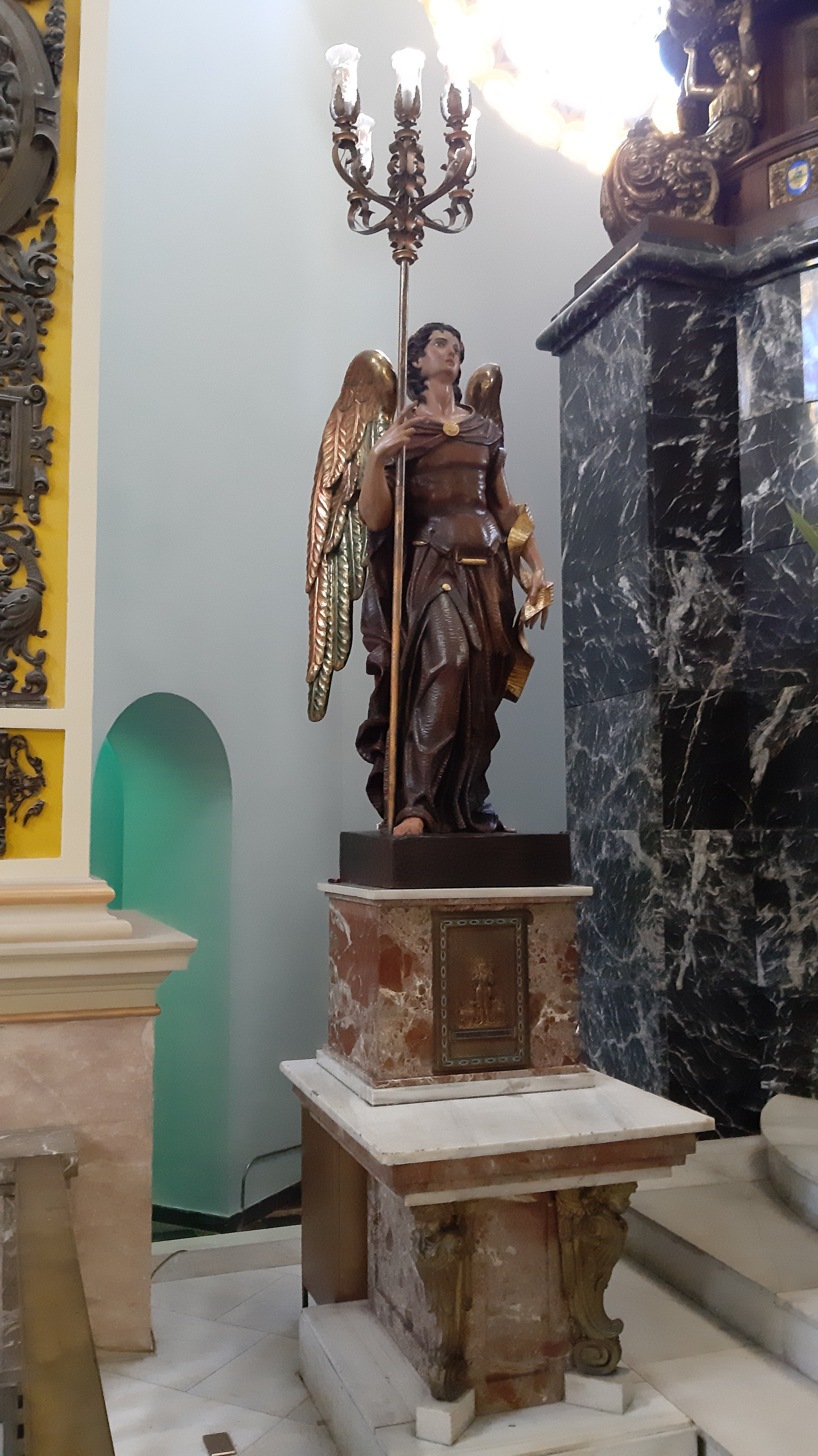
Angel south side

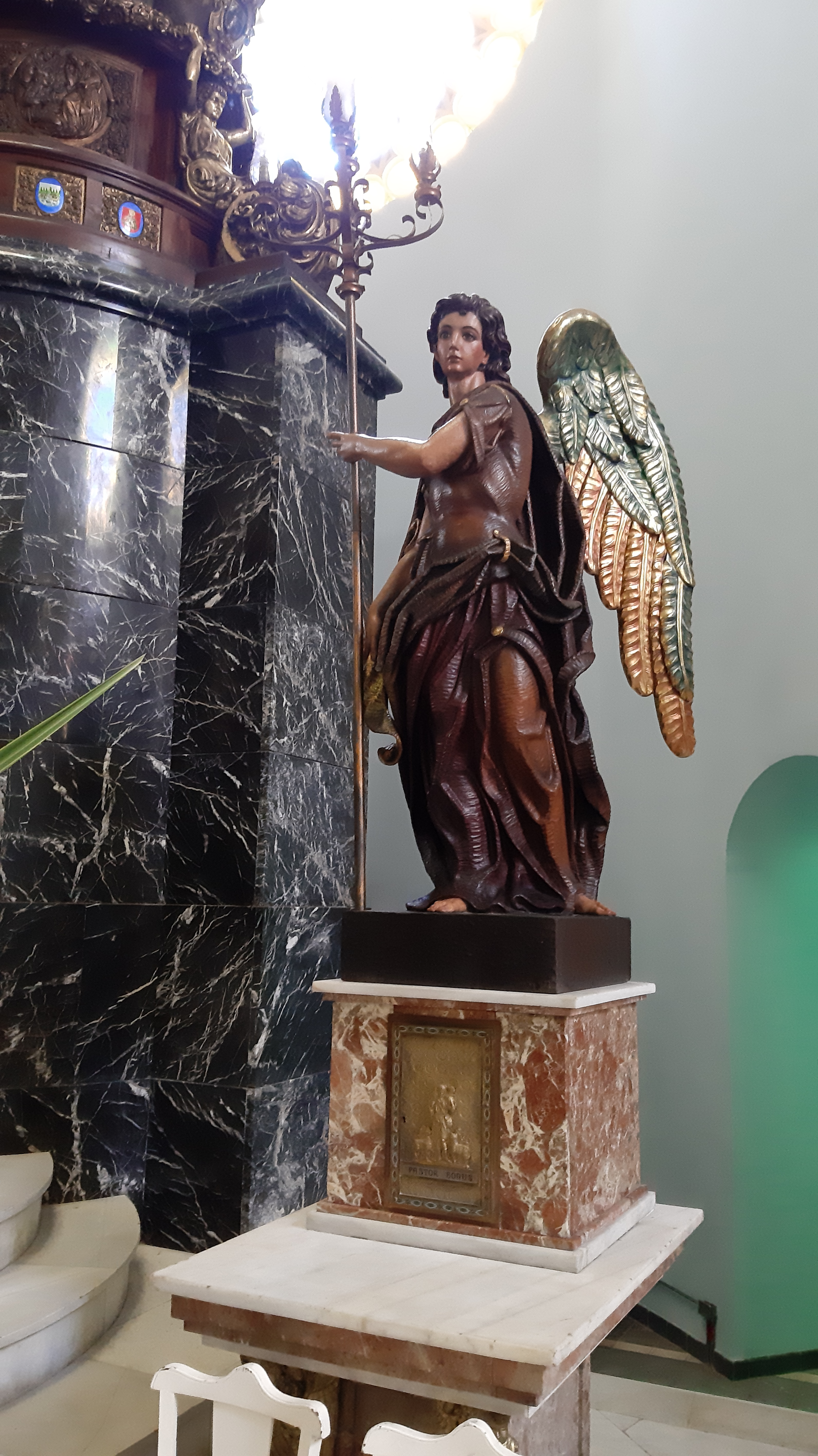
Angel north side.

The angels guarding the main altarpiece, made by "Talleres de arte Granda" of Madrid.

The image of the Resurrection was acquired in one of the stores in Bogotá, originally commissioned by one of the towns of the diocese, but when they found it too large, they did not wish to receive it. The images of Saint Anthony and Saint Francis of Paola were also acquired by Fr. Jové; they are from the "Taller El Arte Cristiano" in the city of Olot, one of the most prominent religious imagery workshops in Spain.

In 1930, the temple bought "two beautiful images, that of the Nativity and that of Saint Thérèse", both made of polychromed wood, with gold leaf and glass eyes, from Casa Rius.

Years later, in 1960, a sculptural shipment arrived from Spain consisting of two large carved angels (currently accompanying the main altarpiece) and "a gigantic carved image of the Blessed Virgin of the Miraculous Medal", (currently located in the Antioquia chapel) and were made by "Talleres de Arte Granda" in Madrid, one of the most prominent artistic workshops in Spain.

The angels, almost 2 meters high, are in a modern Baroque style, made of carved wood, donated by the lawyer Álvaro Fonnegra, and first used on 21 August 1960. Each carving cost 2000 dollars, including the structures on which they rest, consisting of "two credence tables and small marble tables in white and red jasper tones, with bronze supports for the projecting micro-altar console, tabernacles with gilded bronze veneers and strips of blue enamel".

The enormous image of the Virgin of the Miraculous Medal is made of carved and polychromed wood, with glass eyes and gold leaf; it was blessed on 17 September of the same year (1960) by the then bishop of Santa Fe de Antioquia, Msgr. Guillermo Escobar Vélez.

==== Sculptures stored in the deposit ====
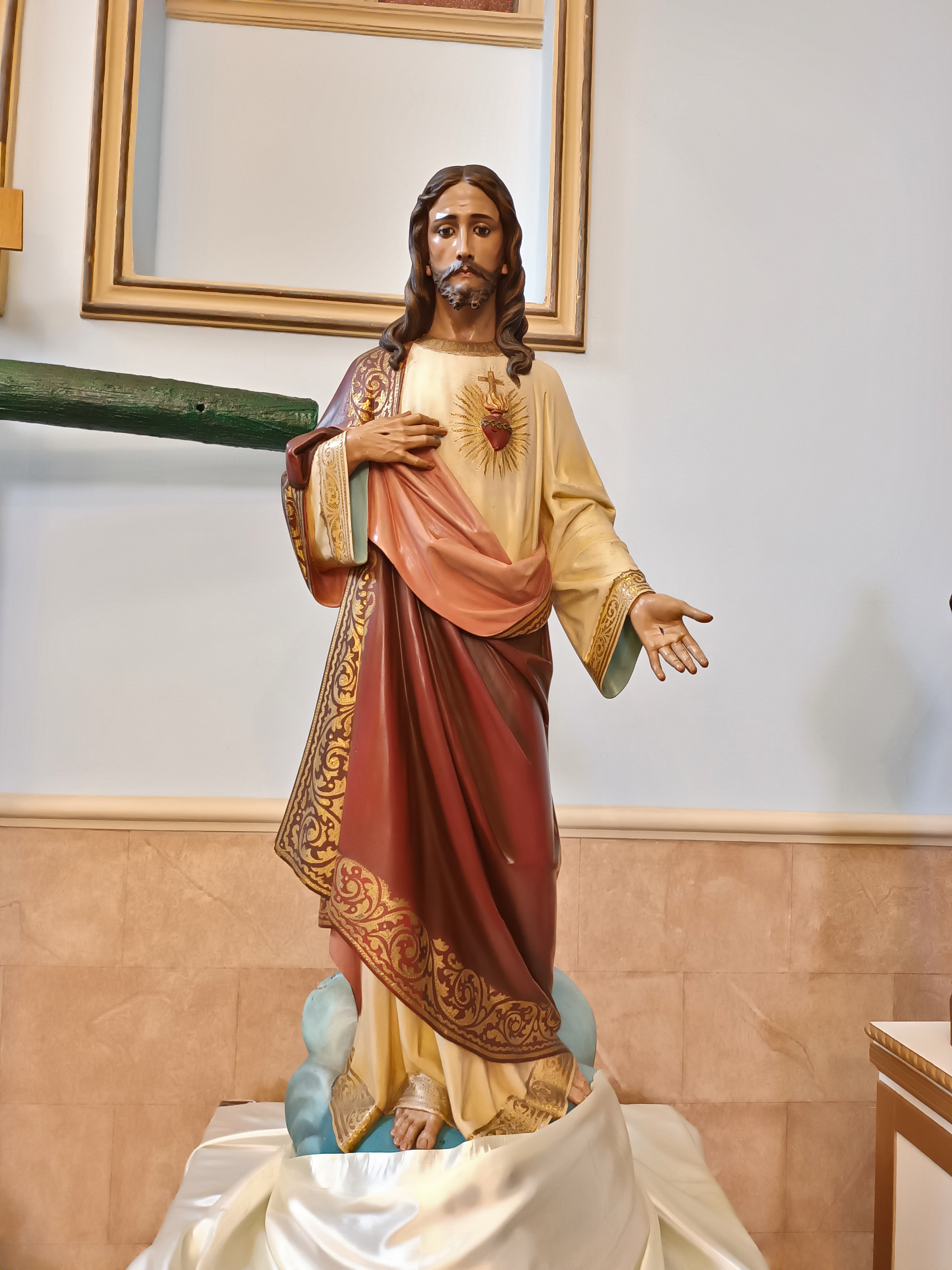
Second statue of the Sacred Heart of Jesus that the basilica had and that presided over the temple from the main altarpiece between 1919 and 1952.

In the deposit adjacent to the sacristy, the images used to be displayed on certain dates of the liturgical year are stored. Among the most outstanding sculptures located in this enclosure is the image of the Sacred Heart of Jesus, made of carved and polychromed wood, signed and dated 1919, from the Rius Workshop in Barcelona. This image was the second image of the Sacred Heart that the basilica had and presided over the temple from the main altarpiece. This image was part of the sculptural group of the Holy Family, located from 1919 to 1952 in the presbytery, such that the Sacred Heart was placed in the main altarpiece, and together, to the right, was the statue of the Virgin Mary (under the title of the Immaculate Heart), and to the left, Saint Joseph (these images are currently located in the side niches of the crossing).

The other images stored in the deposit make up three groups: the first concerns the Holy Week floats and special church festivals; the second and third are nativity scenes of different formats and sizes, with cardboard, plaster, and textile supports on a metal structure.

The large-format images that make up the processional floats and one of the nativity scenes were made by the Taller El Arte Cristiano, of Olot, Spain, and made of the material called "cartón-madera" paste. (Note: Imagery is a specialty of the art of sculpture, the plastic representation of religious themes, usually realistic and with devotional, liturgical, processional, or catechetical purposes. The most common technique is carving in polychromed wood, but there are also other techniques and materials for making images. Some of these techniques were especially conceived for processional use, characterized by their creators seeking, as one of their main objectives, to lighten the weight of the load. Devotional images for processional purposes constitute a type of image in which art and craftsmanship are fused and are included within the generic denomination of "light imagery". At the end of the 19th century, industrial production also influenced imagery, which benefited from the production and dissemination of new iconographies and lower costs. In industrial imagery, the Spanish town of Olot will stand out in particular, which at its peak had more than 30 imagery workshops. The creation of works for processions in these workshops was immediate. The workshops of Olot, several of which still continue to produce and market their numerous original models, use as their main material the so-called cardboard-wood paste or wood-like paste, which quickly achieved classification as artistic material. In Spain, outside the Olot workshops, there were also some in Valencia, Barcelona, Murcia, and even Madrid, but those of Olot were the most outstanding, especially "El Arte Cristiano", which was the first. In France and Italy, there were also workshops that exported. Although the technique is named as such by its manufacturers and is thus recognized, This may not be the best way to name the technique, because it has little to do with cardboard and even less with wood; in reality, the raw material used is plaster reinforced with textile fibers. The production process of these images has not changed much from its beginnings to the present. The first step in the production of an image of this type was the creation of the original model made of clay from which a first plaster mold would be obtained, serving as the basis for serial reproduction. On this original mold called charpa, another soft gelatin mold is made, which will be used to reproduce a series. With a gelatin mold, 3 to 9 images can be made. The next step is to mold the image; for this, several layers of cardboard-wood paste reinforced with burlap and wooden slats are applied. The parts of the image are assembled and joined, then need to be polished and finished. The polychromy is done on a primer called encarnado, on which the final oil paint is applied. The technique with cardboard-wood paste meant an important advance in the production of images, as it implied: less molding time, lighter pieces, and greater resistance of the material.: Guzmán Moral, Salvador (2017). "Aproximación a la "imaginería ligera"". Revista Torralbo. Lucena: Agrupación de Cofradías de Lucena: 137–144.) These sculptures were imported by order from Spain, from the "Almacén Lourdes" of Mr. Antonio Brando (located behind the Bogotá cathedral, on Carrera 6). He requested them from the Spanish workshop, according to the client's tastes. There they placed the images on wooden bases with a hexagonal or octagonal shape, two steps, and modulated edges, to which the small silver-colored metal plaque with black lettering was glued, saying "Taller El Arte Cristiano".

This Spanish workshop, which produced two dozen sculptures for the basilica, has an artisan tradition from 1880 to the present. The sculptures made of cardboard-wood paste (actually plaster reinforced with textile fibers) have the affirmative concession from the Sacred Congregation of Rites and Indulgences, therefore considered noble and venerable material, as stated in the decree of 1 April 1887 issued by said congregation.

Another outstanding sculpture is the image of the Recumbent Christ, made of carved, polychromed wood with glass eyes, and together with its sepulcher, was made by the Candela Workshop. These works remain stored almost all year in the Sacristy deposit, but during Holy Week they are displayed in the south arm of the Temple's transept, next to the Main Altar.

==== Angels at the base of the dome ====
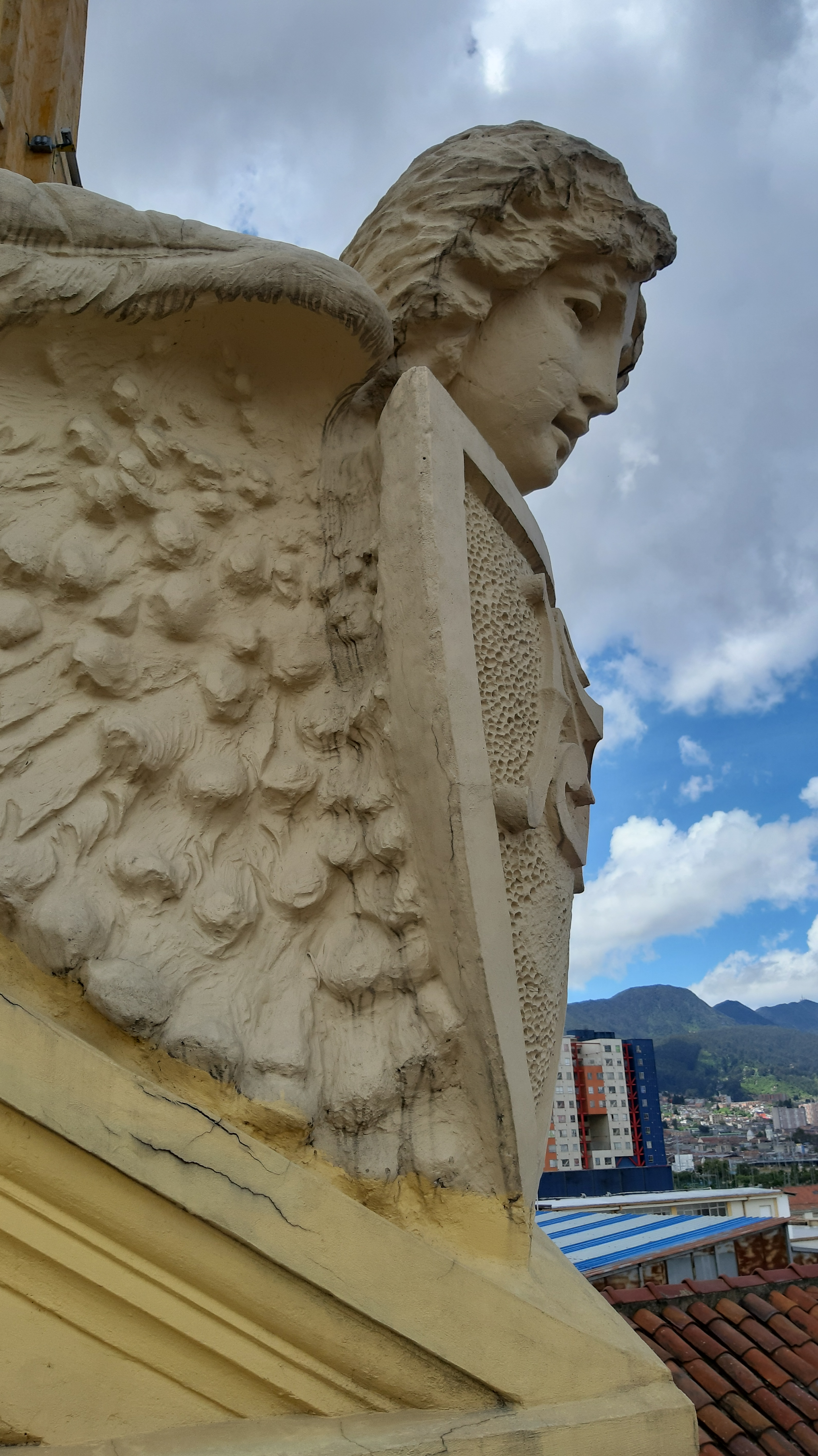
One of the corner angels.

At the corners of the exterior base of the dome drum, there are four sculptures of angels (cherubs) with the monogram of the Sacred Heart of Jesus. There is no information about the author of the design or manufacture of these four angels, although due to their location and characteristics, it is known that they were part of the dome and transept construction project completed in 1938.

Each sculpture consists of a head protruding from the top of a pointed shield containing the monogram of the Sacred Heart; on the sides of the shield, two wings unfold, one on each side. The sculptures were originally made with a yellow/ocher colored cement and sand mortar. Each sculpture has an internal metal structure supporting it.

Before restoration, the sculptures showed superficial erosion caused by weathering conditions and also presented cracks and fissures in the cement. They also exhibited black and green stains due to environmental pollution and biological colonization.

=== Stained glass windows ===
==== Chapel stained glass windows ====
The stained glass windows of the side chapels of the basilica were designed by the artist Ricardo Acevedo Bernal under the ideas of the priest Antonio María Pueyo de Val, who was in charge of the temple's construction between 1911 and 1916. The windows were installed between 1915 and 1916, cost around 10,000 pesos, and were made in Madrid, Spain.

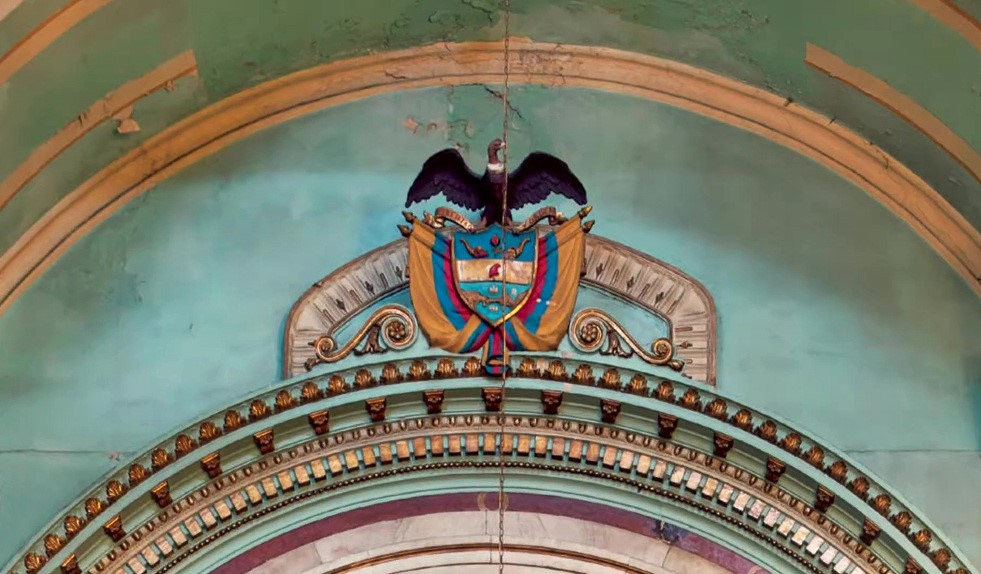
Detail of the top of the Police Chapel; behind the coat of arms of Colombia, vestiges of the window that contained a stained glass window can be seen.

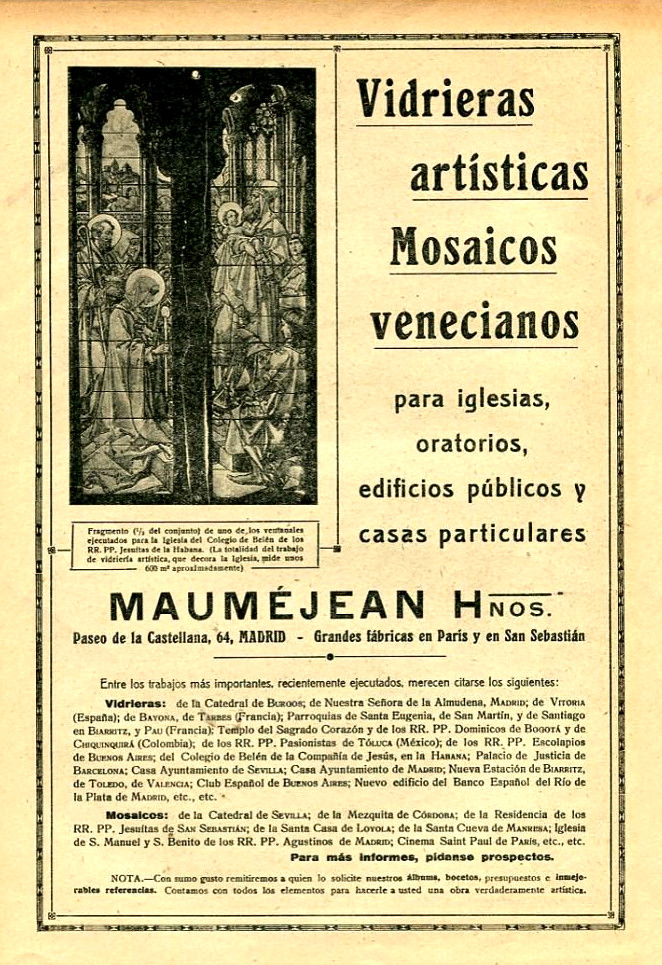
The stained glass windows are made of painted glass, made by the Casa Maumejean, a family business founded in 1860 by Jules Pierre Maumejean, who at the age of 23 established his first workshop in Pau (France) on Rue Montpensier. The founder's sons expanded the business to Madrid and Paris. (Note: Publicity advertisement for Casa Maumejean in 1919, where they cite recently executed important works, including the Voto Nacional temple and the Chiquinquirá basilica in Colombia. Casa Maumejean is a company specializing in artistic stained glass with over 150 years of history. In 1860, Jules Pierre Maumejean, from a family of porcelain painters, at the age of 23 established his first workshop in Pau (France) on Rue Montpensier. Jules married Marie Honorine Lalanne and they had five children: Joseph Jules Maumejean, Jean Siméon Henri Maumejean, Léon Ernest Maumejean, Marie Thérèse Maumejean, and Charles Emile Maumejean. All the sons followed their father's artistic path and quickly became prominent glass painters. However, Joseph, Henri, and Charles worked together, while Léon remained independent in Paris, where he died in 1921. In 1890, Jules Pierre Maumejean set up a workshop in Anglet, moving it to Biarritz in 1893, where he died in 1909. Biarritz's proximity to San Sebastián (Spain), which at that time was the summer resort of the aristocracy and the Royal Family, led Jules to come into contact with high society in Madrid, allowing him to obtain numerous commissions and leading him to become a supplier to the Spanish Royal House. At the end of the 19th century, a resurgence in the use of glass took place in Spain, thanks not only to the restoration of existing stained glass windows in Gothic cathedrals and other monuments, but also to new architectural currents that used glass both as an architectural and decorative element in the so-called "iron architecture". The Art Nouveau movement was born, which together with the later Art Deco, offered new artistic possibilities for the use of glass. Therefore, in 1898, Joseph Jules Maumejean established a workshop in Madrid on Calle Abascal, No. 39, moving a few years later to Paseo de la Castellana, No. 64. Then came the workshops in Barcelona and San Sebastián, the latter specializing in mosaics, a technique in which the Parisian establishment run by Charles particularly excelled. From this moment on, all the workshops were grouped together in S. A. Maumejean Hermanos, based in Madrid, which undoubtedly contributed decisively to the success of the company and the large number of works from their workshops existing in Spain and especially in Madrid. In Paris, the Maumejean Brothers created a new workshop, registered in 1921 as a "Mosaics-Venetian enamels" workshop, incorporated two years later as a limited company under the name "S.A. Maumejean", based in the same building where the workshop was. Shortly after, they opened another new workshop in Hendaye, which would become very commercially successful over time. Henri, who directed the Madrid workshop, died in 1932, leaving his brother Joseph in charge, who died in 1952; five years later Charles died in Paris in 1957, and his son Georges in 1970. Thus culminated the saga of the long Maumejean dynasty, stained glass artists who worked tirelessly for three consecutive generations. The Maumejean brothers always tried to produce their commissions using traditional techniques such as lead came, but without forgetting new advances, such as cloisonné. Casa Maumejean has made beautiful stained glass windows for public, religious, and private buildings, mainly in France and Spain, although many of their works have been commissioned from other countries in Europe, America, Asia, and Africa. The workshop on Paseo de la Castellana moved to Calle Zabaleta until a few years ago, when it moved to Alcalá de Henares, after the craftsman Francisco Hernando Pascual took over the firm.: Vidrieras Maumejean. "Quiénes Somos" [About Us] (in Spanish).) Joseph Jules Maumejean created the Maumejean workshop at Paseo de la Castellana No. 64 in Madrid in 1898, where the 16 stained glass windows of the Voto Nacional were made, as stated in the signature on each window. The Maumejean workshops are a prestigious Artistic Stained Glass House that has had numerous commissions, not only from France and Spain, where they were established, but also from the rest of Europe, Africa, Asia, and America. Some of their best-known works adorn the Bayonne Cathedral, the Biarritz Town Hall, the Seville Cathedral, the Burgos Cathedral, the Cathedral of María Inmaculada in Vitoria, the Diocesan Museum of Sacred Art of Álava, and the Basilica of the Assumption in Lekeitio; they became the official stained glass artists for the Royal House of Alfonso XII. In Colombia, the stained glass windows of the Medellín Cathedral and the Basilica of Chiquinquirá are also from this house.

Each stained glass window has outstanding aesthetic value, both for its handling of a wide range of colors and for the fine work in establishing shadows, lights, and the saturation of tones; even the assembly of the glass plays with the composition of the designs of each scene.

The group of stained glass windows in the side chapels illustrates a repertoire of saints, philosophers, and theologians who upheld Christian dogmas, iconographically showing 17 centuries of the history of the Catholic Church. Documents reference 16 stained glass windows, but today 14 are preserved, as the stained glass windows of the Cartagena and National Police chapels disappeared, possibly due to the modification of the old presbytery, as the current altarpieces of these chapels were made by Talleres de Arte Granda, and in one of them, the remains of the frame of one of the windows can be seen. Each stained glass window contains one or two saints, each corresponding to a different century, starting chronologically with the Panama chapel (3rd century) and ending with the Popayán chapel (19th century) as follows:

The stained glass windows on the left, facing the altar. They are the following:

Stained glass windows on the south side (Gospel side).

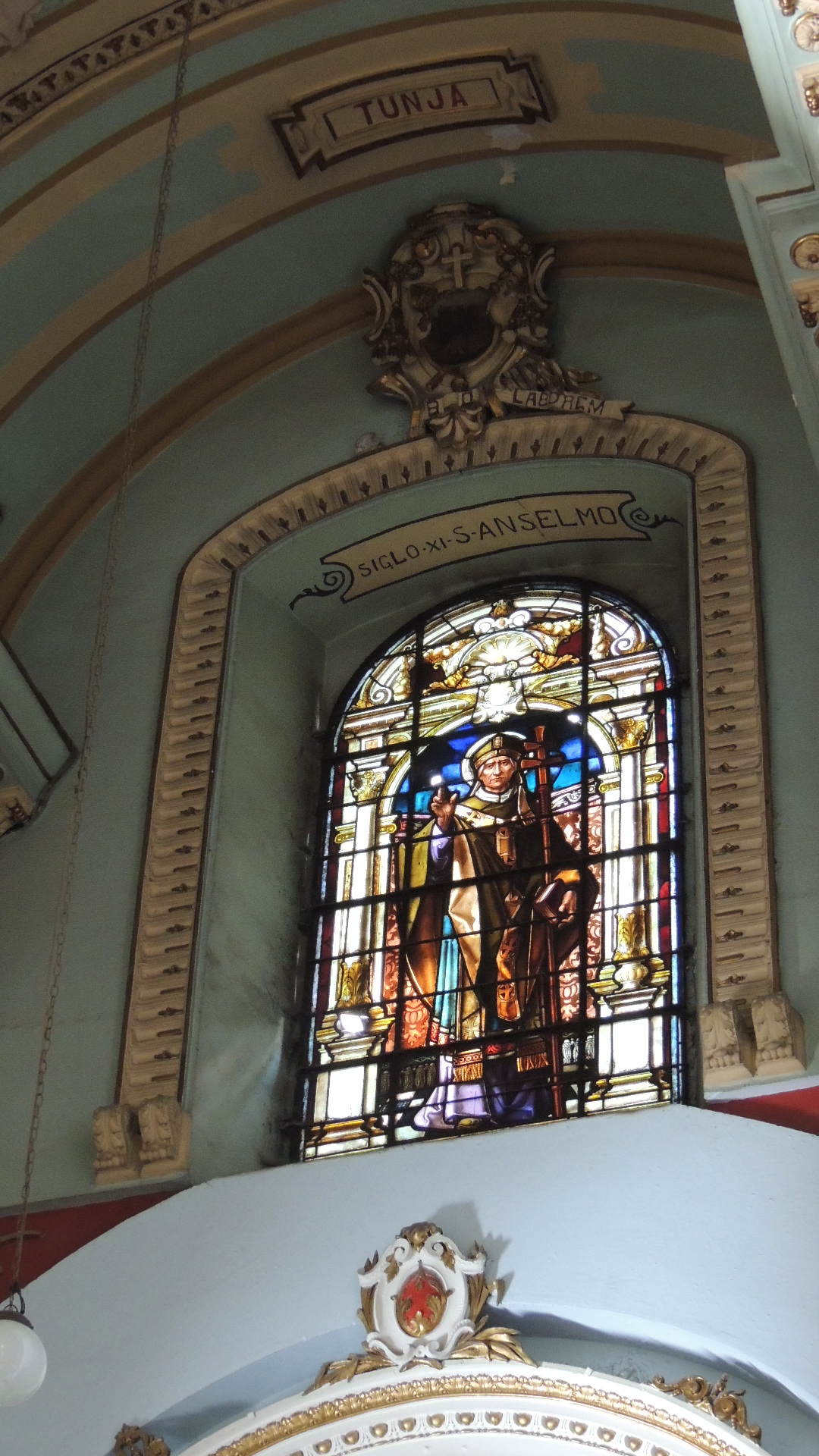
Saint Anselm, 11th century (Tunja)

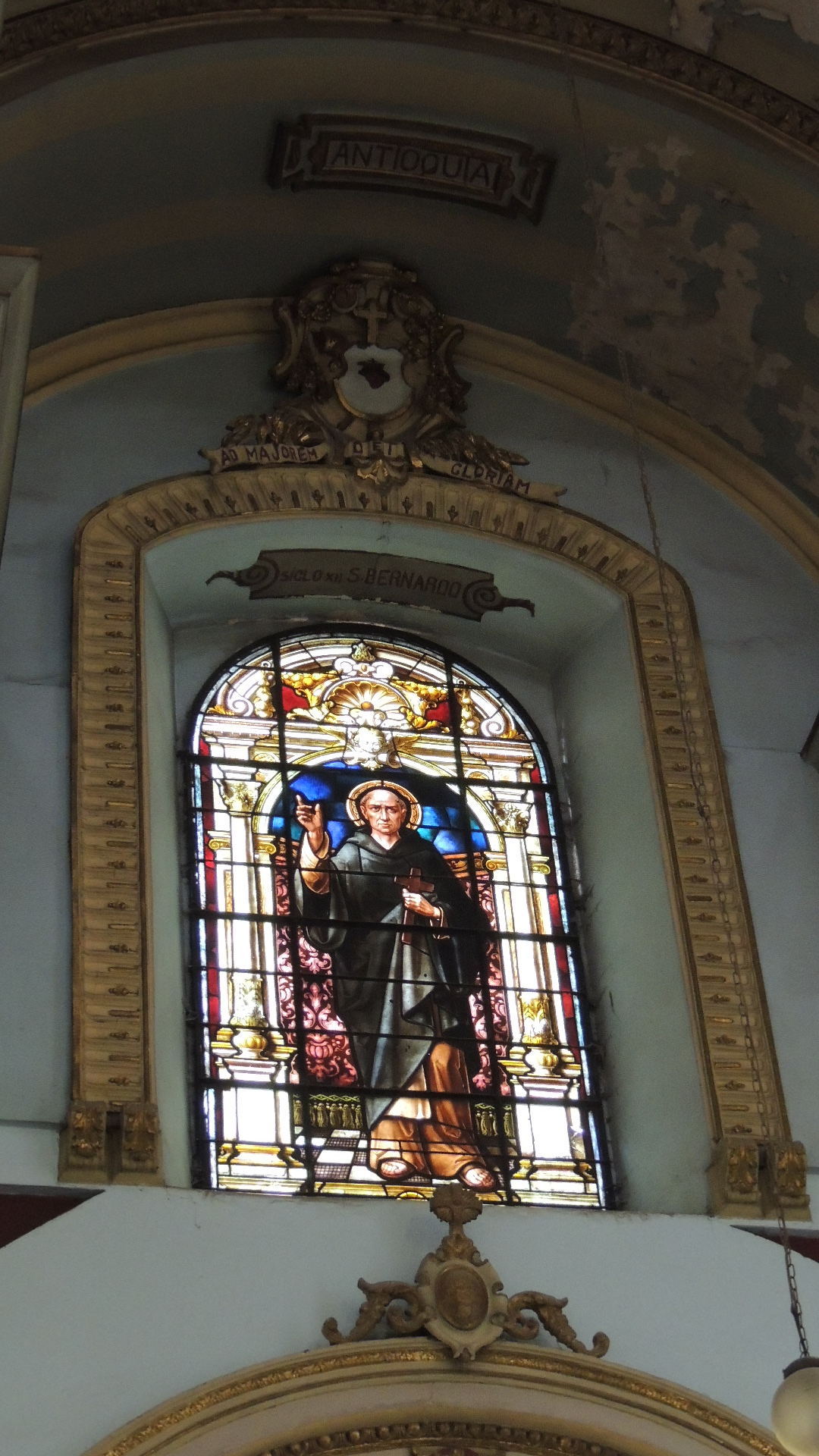
Saint Bernard, 12th century (Antioquia)

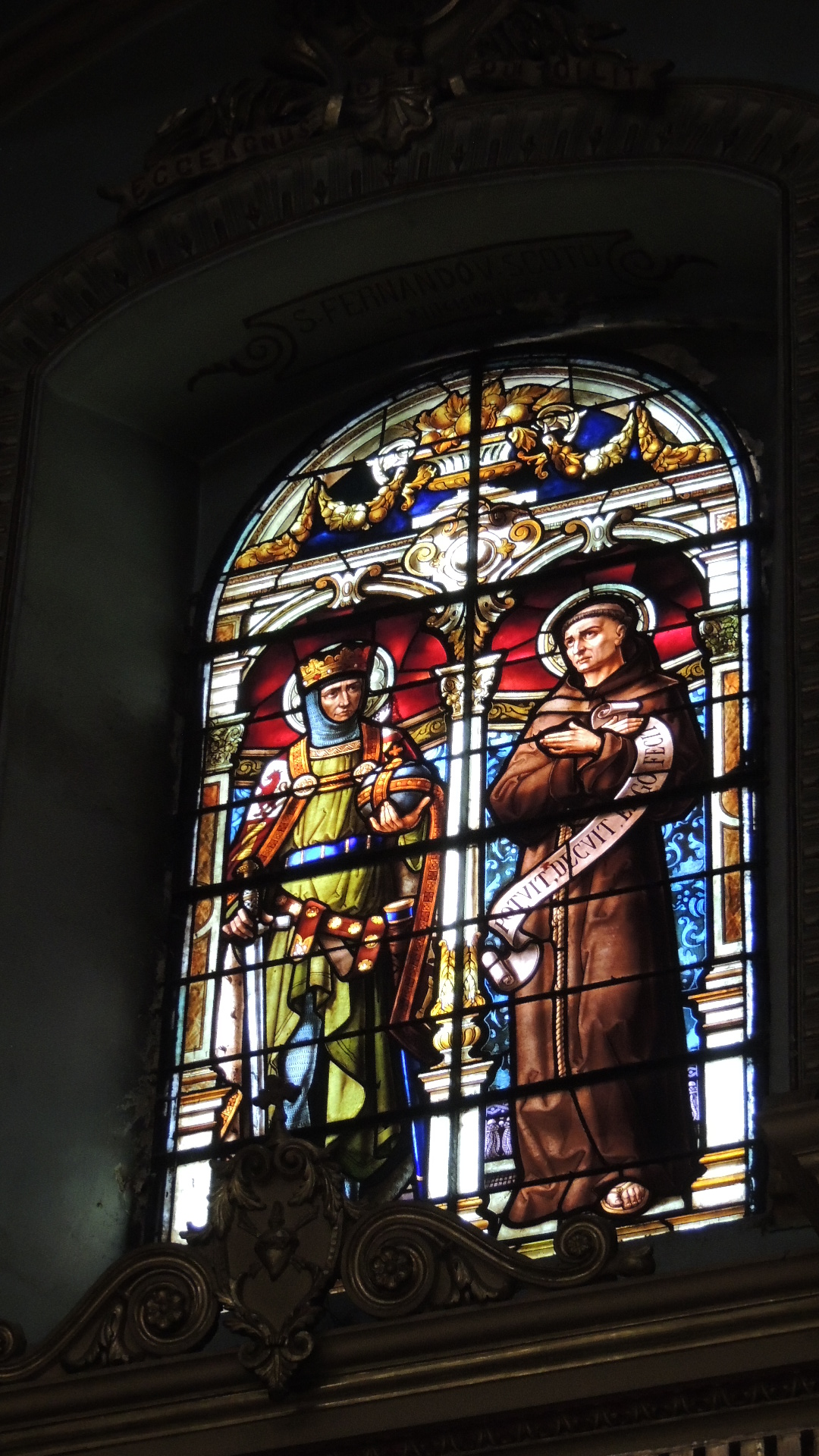
Saint Ferdinand, 13th century and Venerable Scotus, 14th century (Pasto)

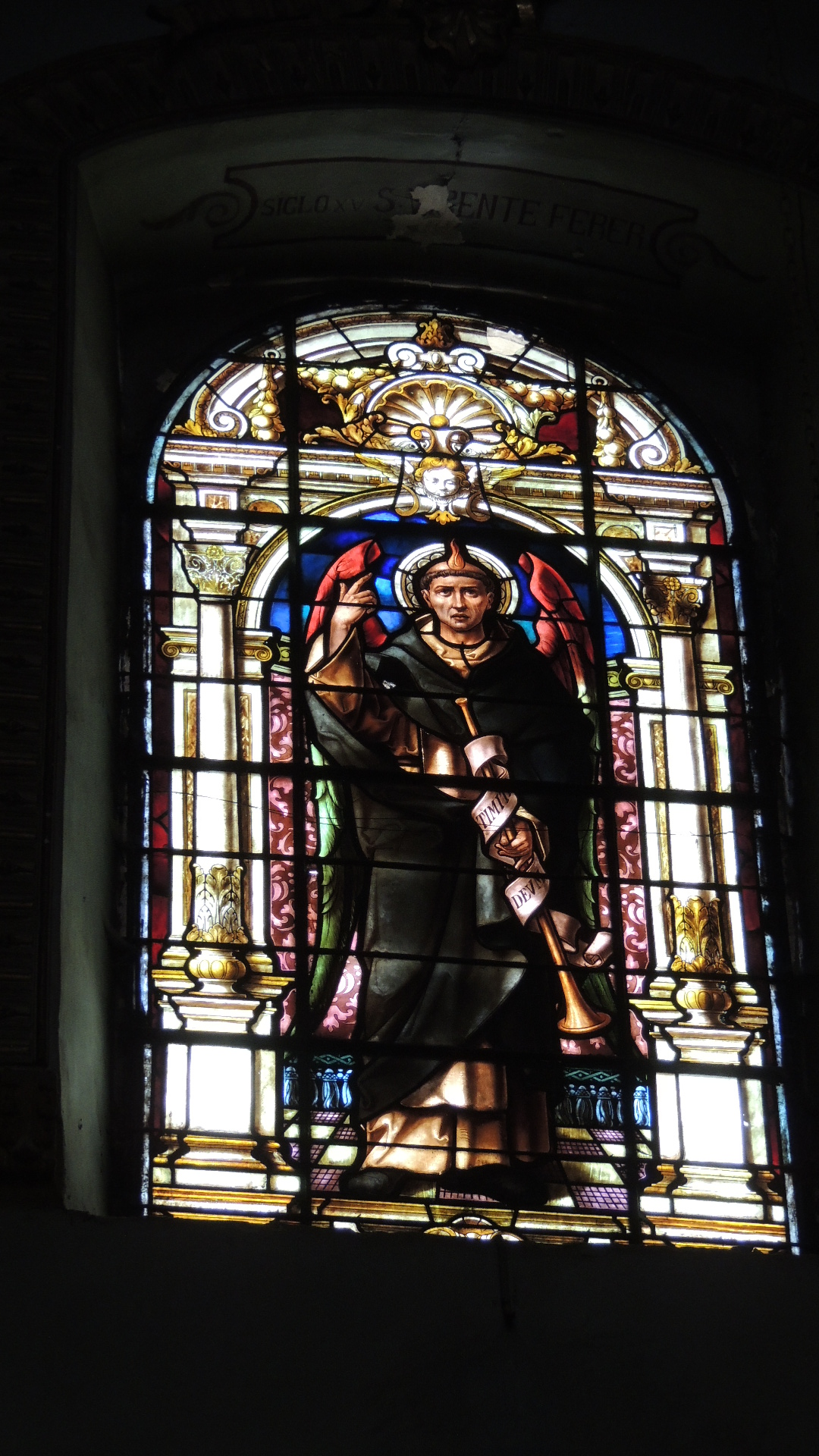
Saint Vincent Ferrer, 15th century (Pamplona)

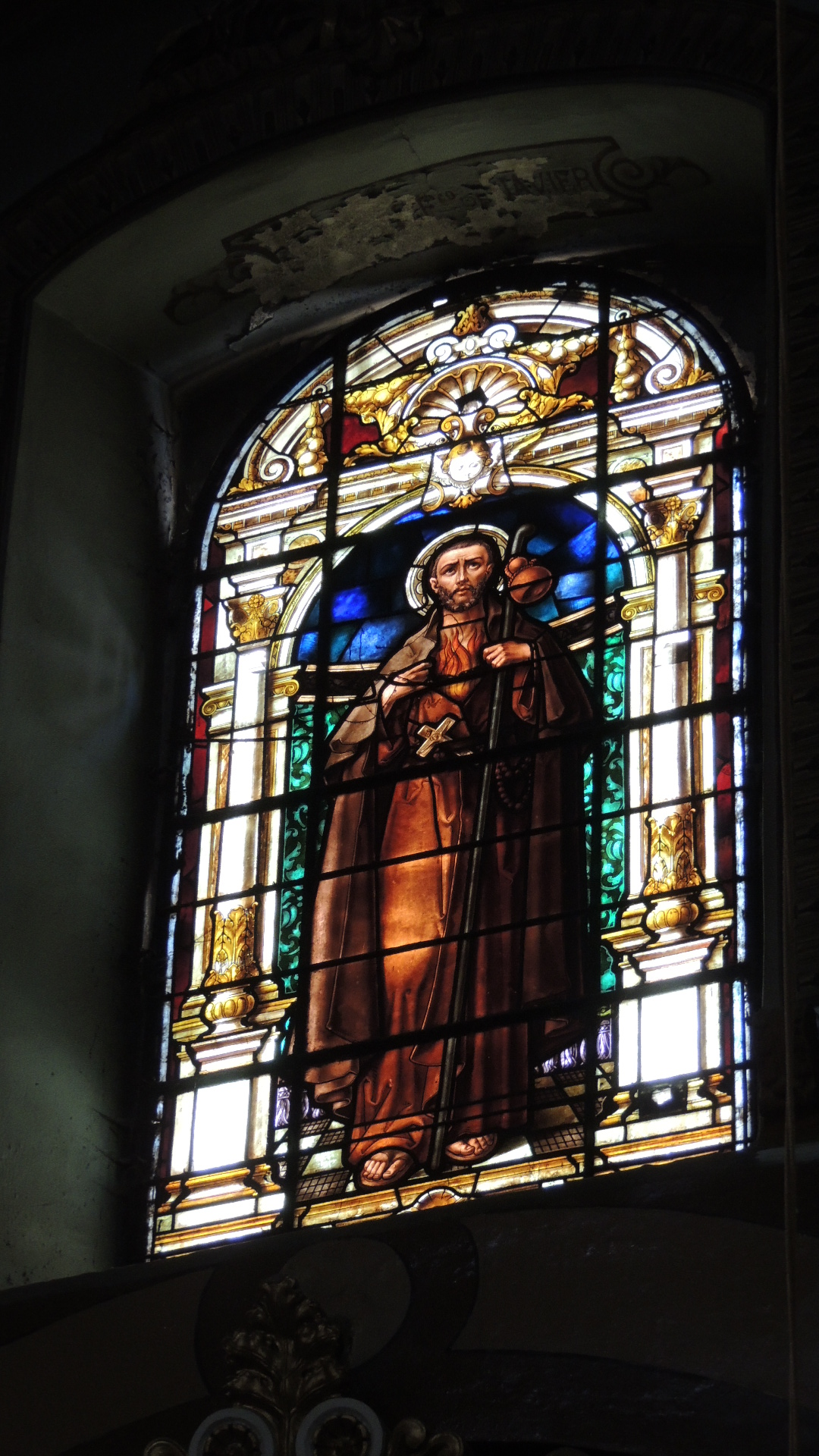
Saint Francis Xavier, 16th century (Santa Marta)

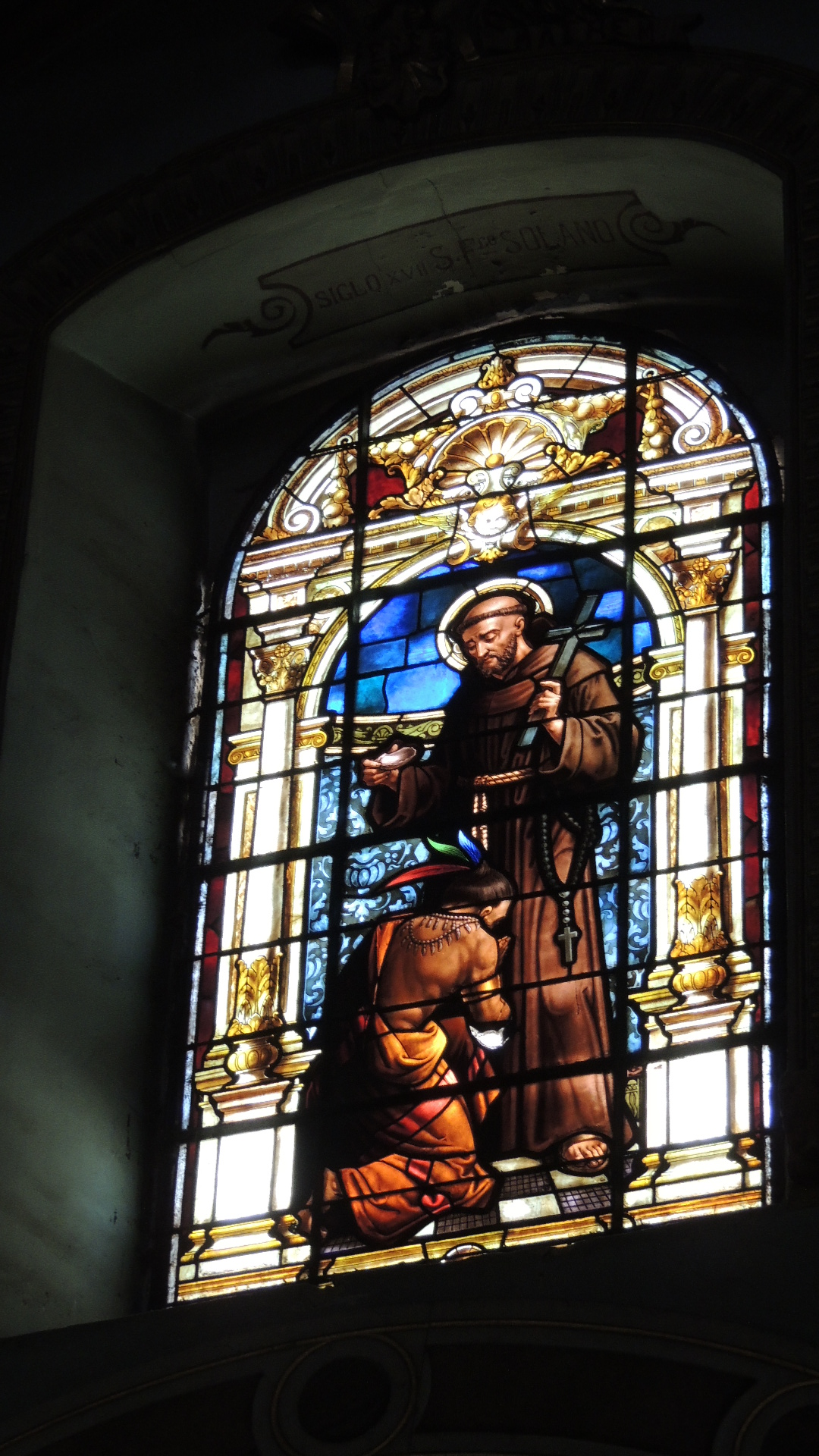
Saint Francis Solanus, 17th century (Medellín)

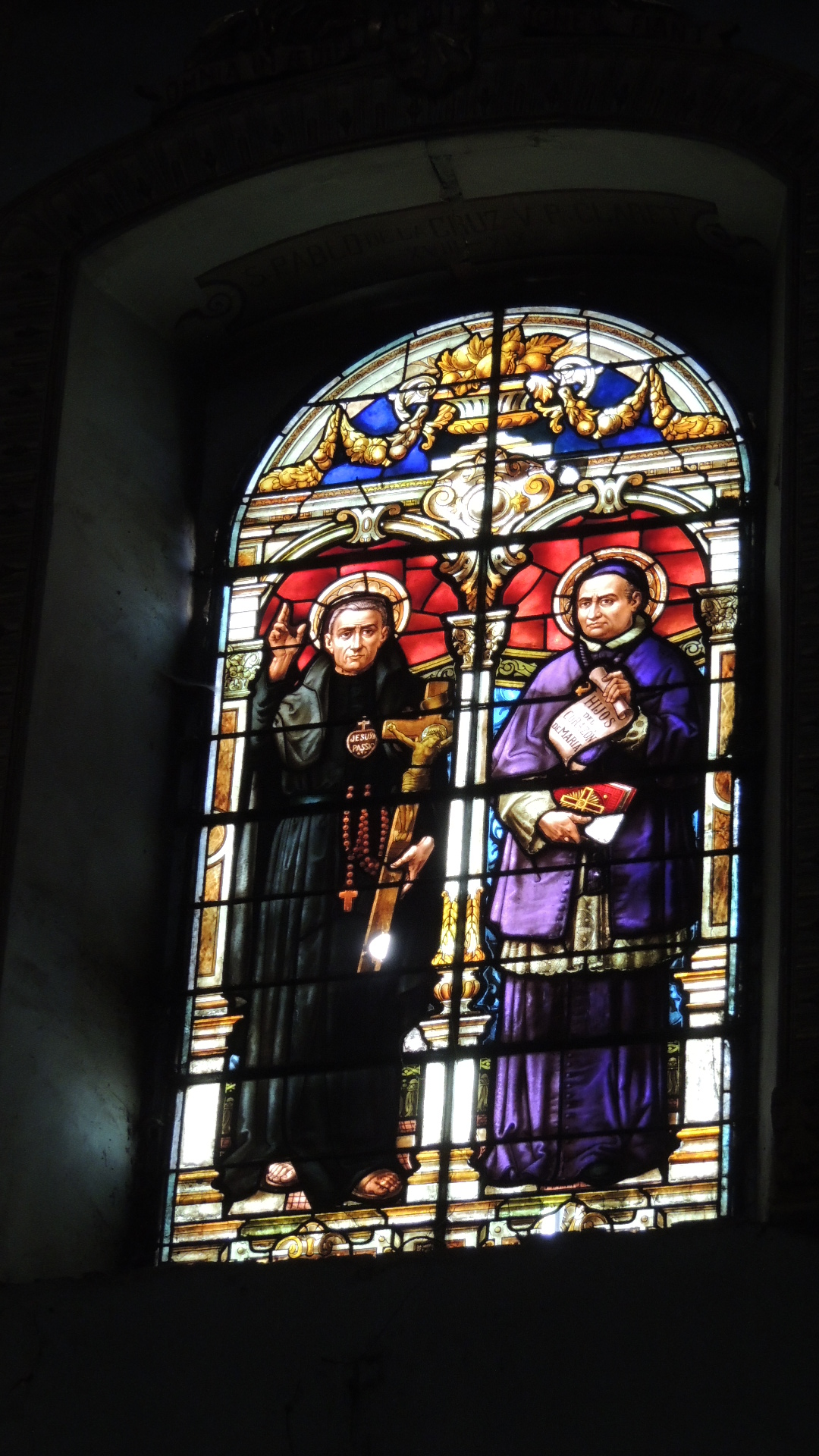
Saint Paul of the Cross, 18th century and Saint Anthony Mary Claret, 19th century (Popayán)

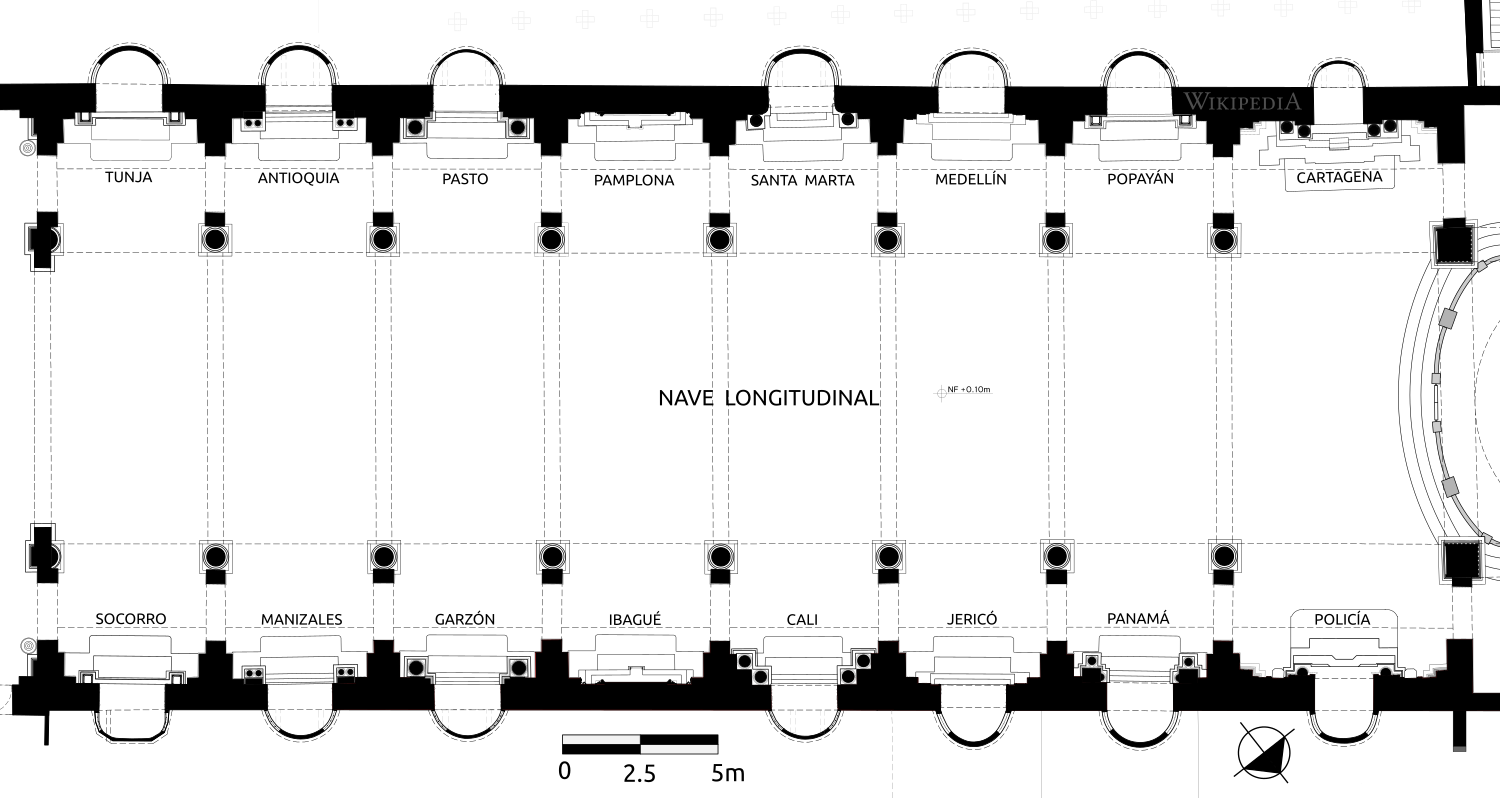
Section of the general plan with the side chapels.

The stained glass windows on the right, facing the altar. They are the following:

Stained glass windows on the north side (Epistle side).

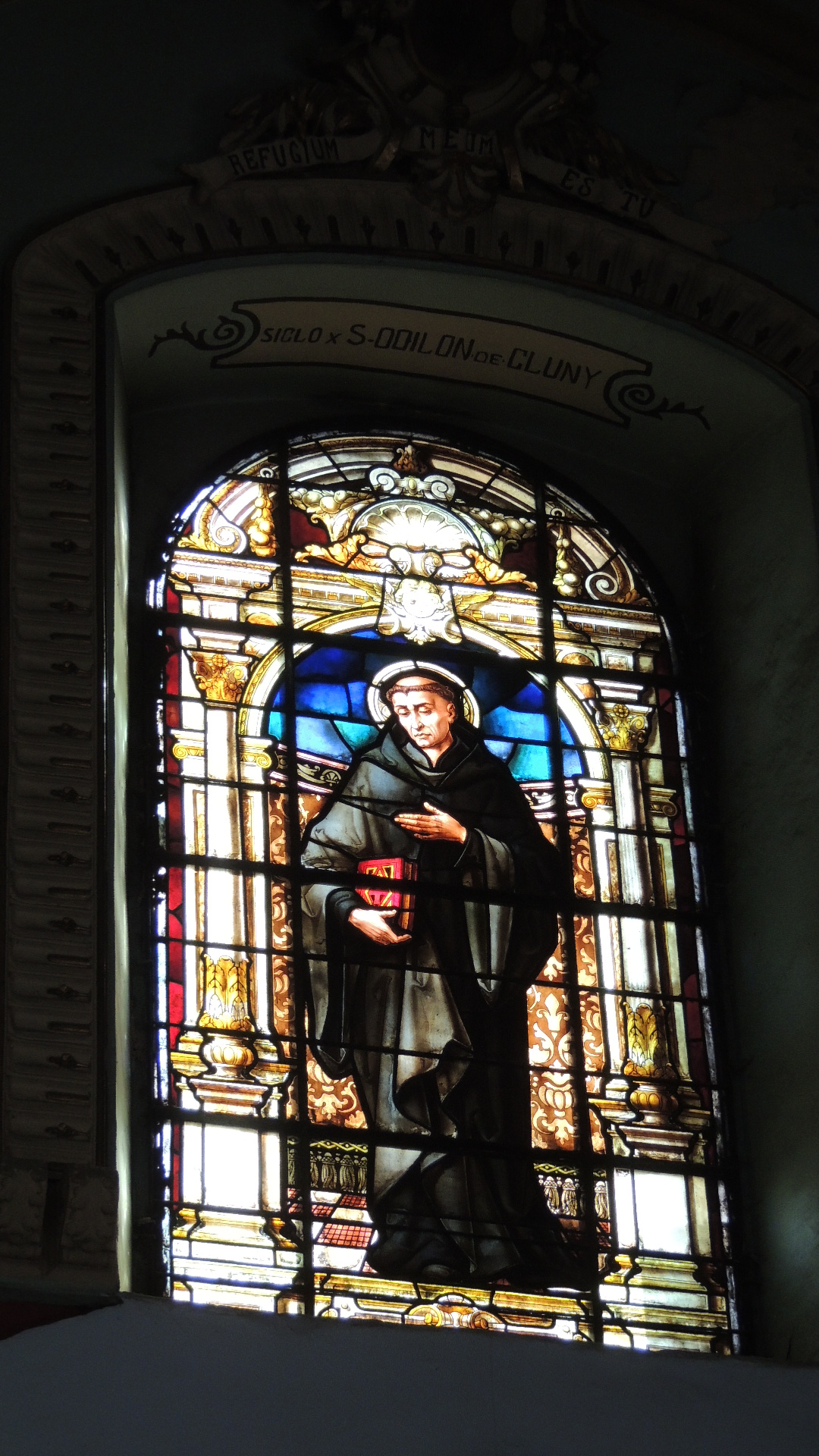
Saint Odilo of Cluny, 10th century (Socorro)

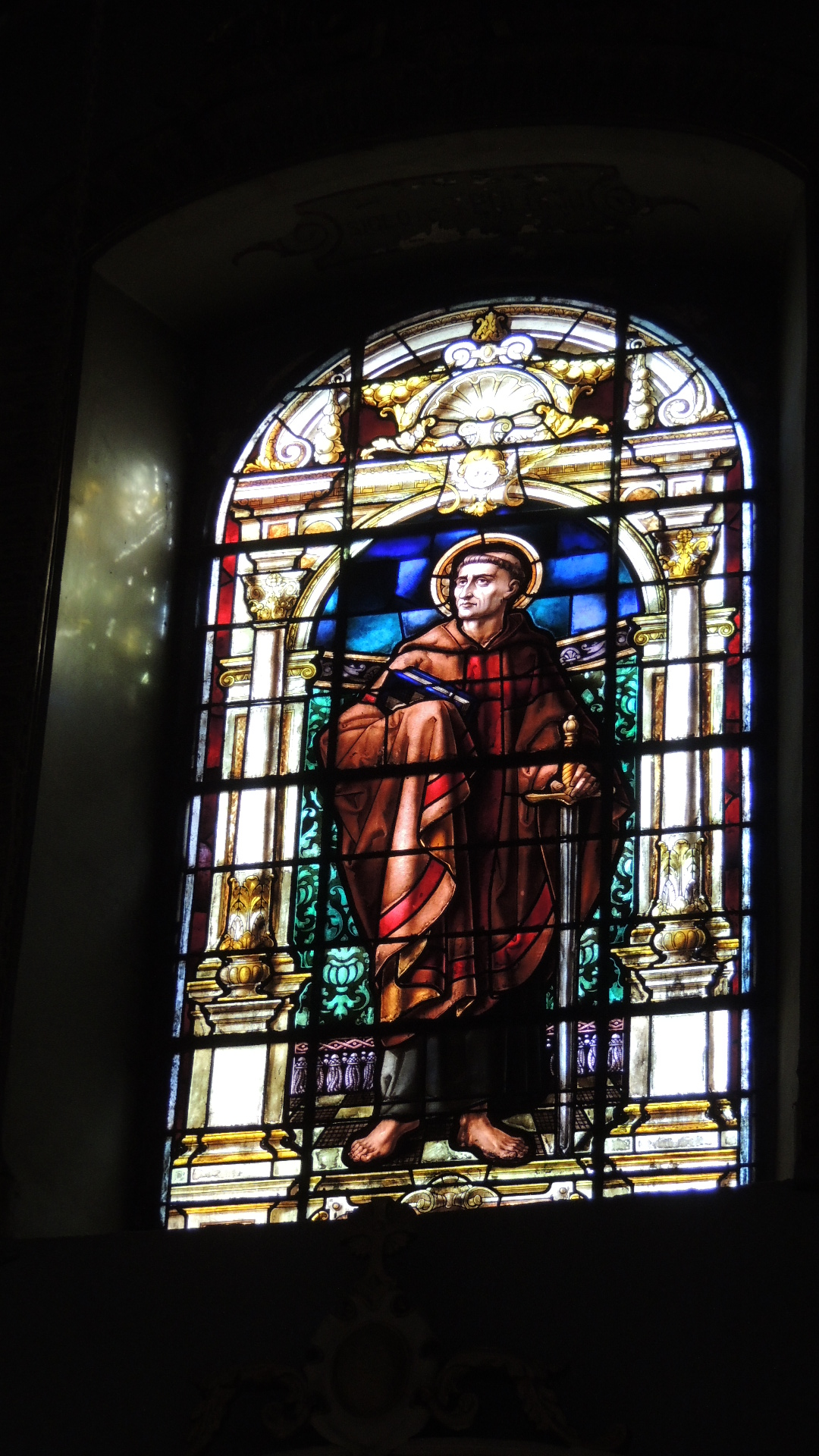
Saint Eulogius, 9th century (Manizales)

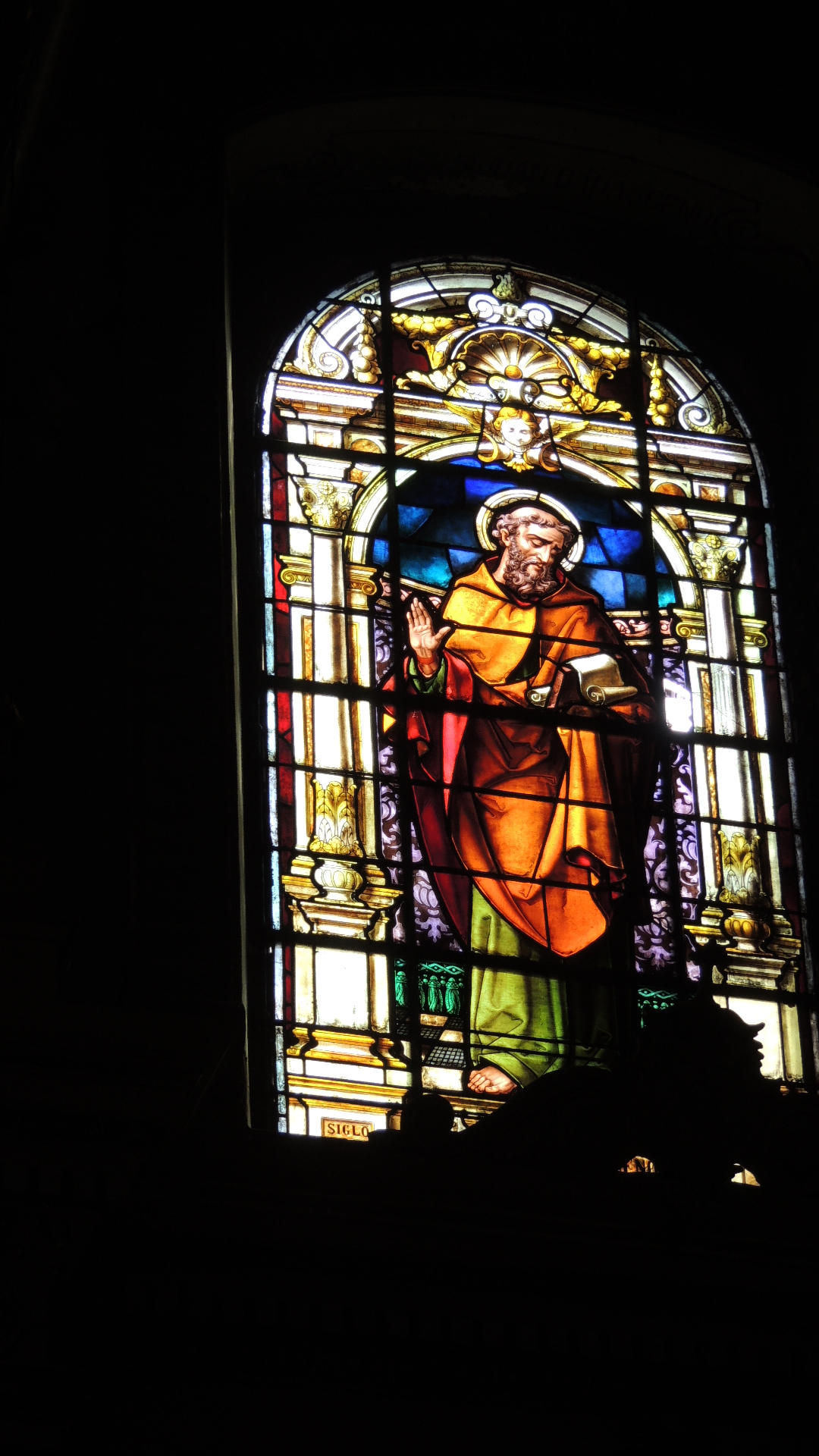
Saint John of Damascus, 8th century (Garzón)

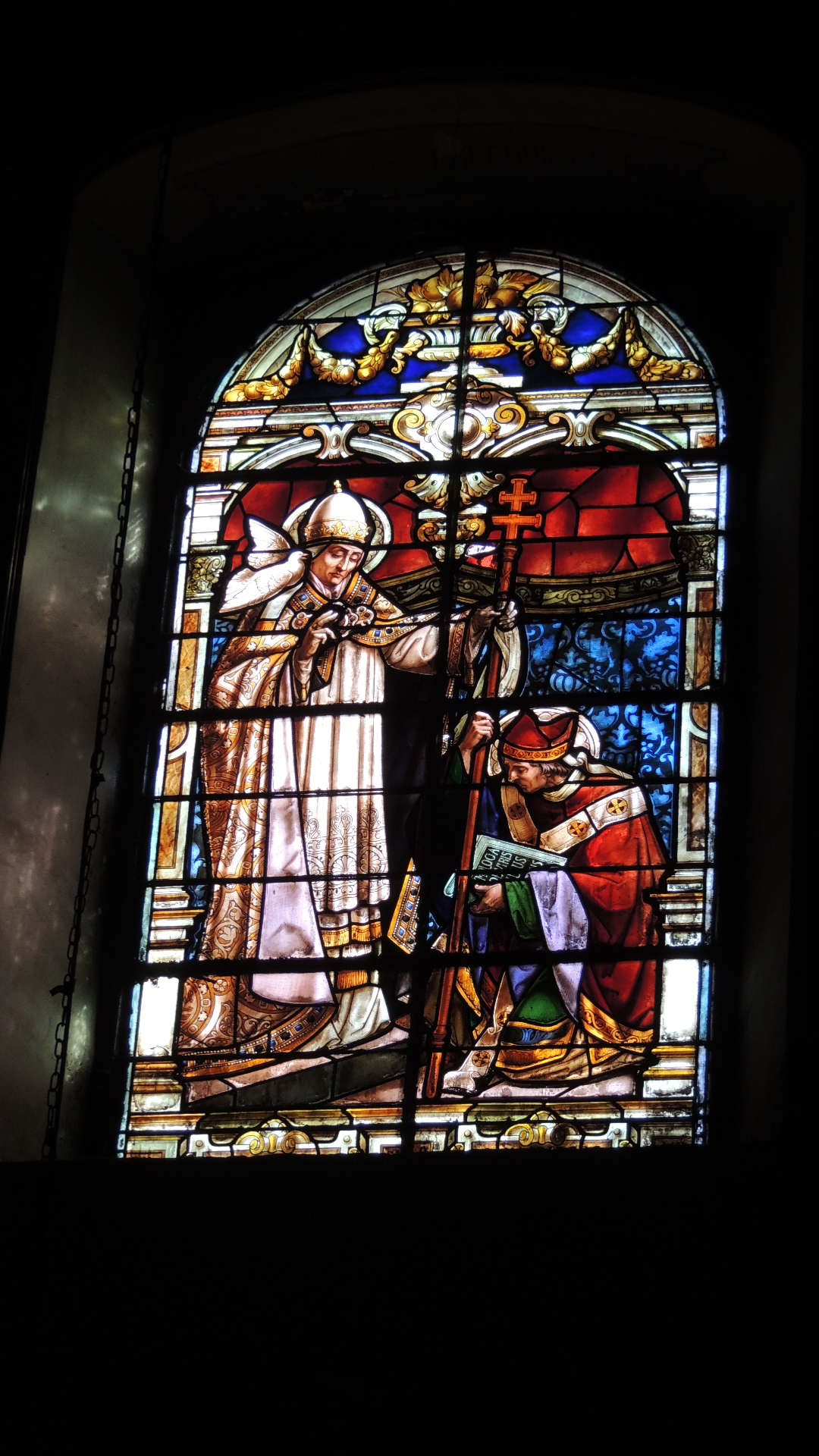
Saint Gregory, 6th century and Saint Isidore, 7th century (Ibagué)

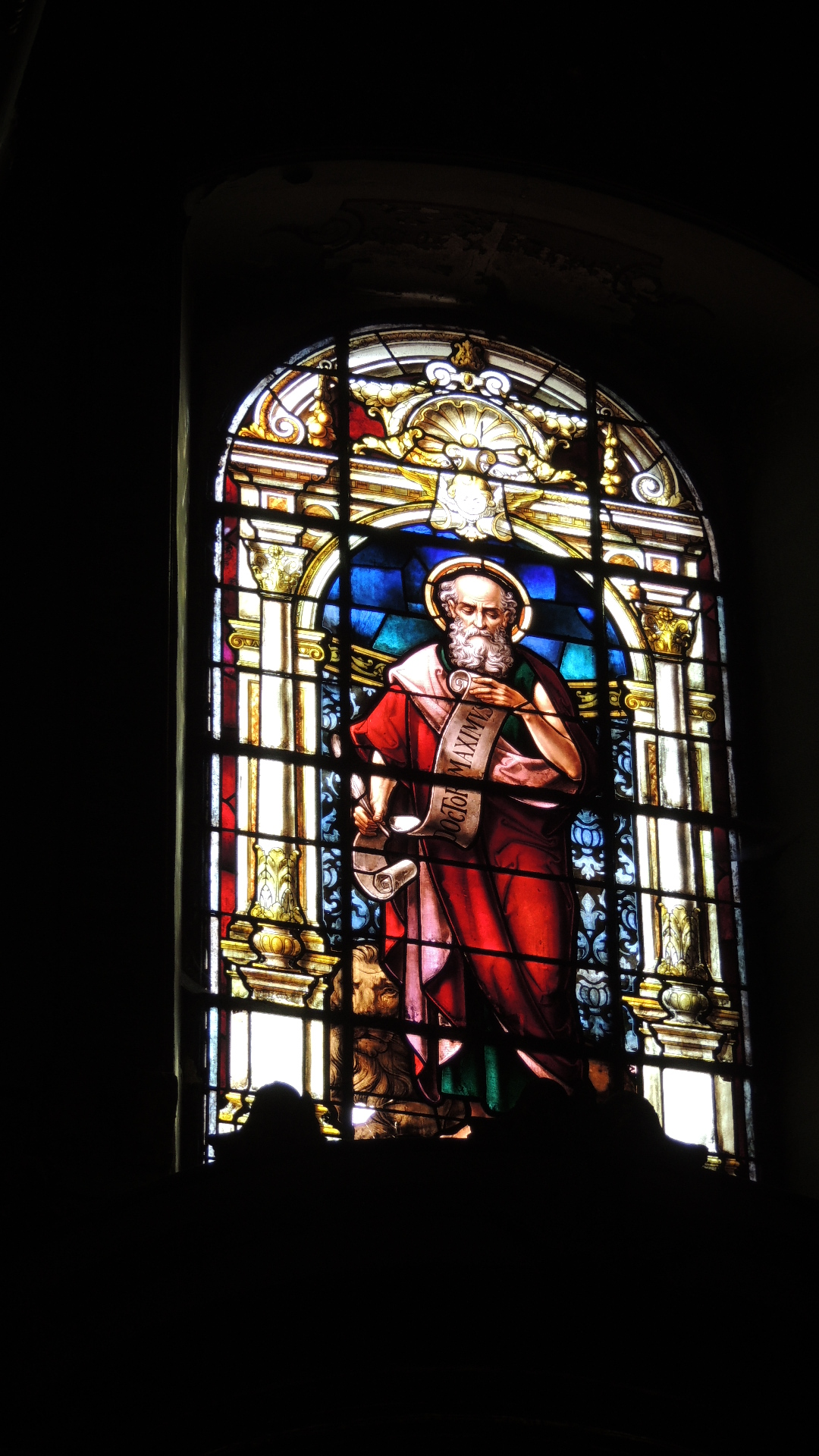
Saint Jerome, 5th century (Cali)

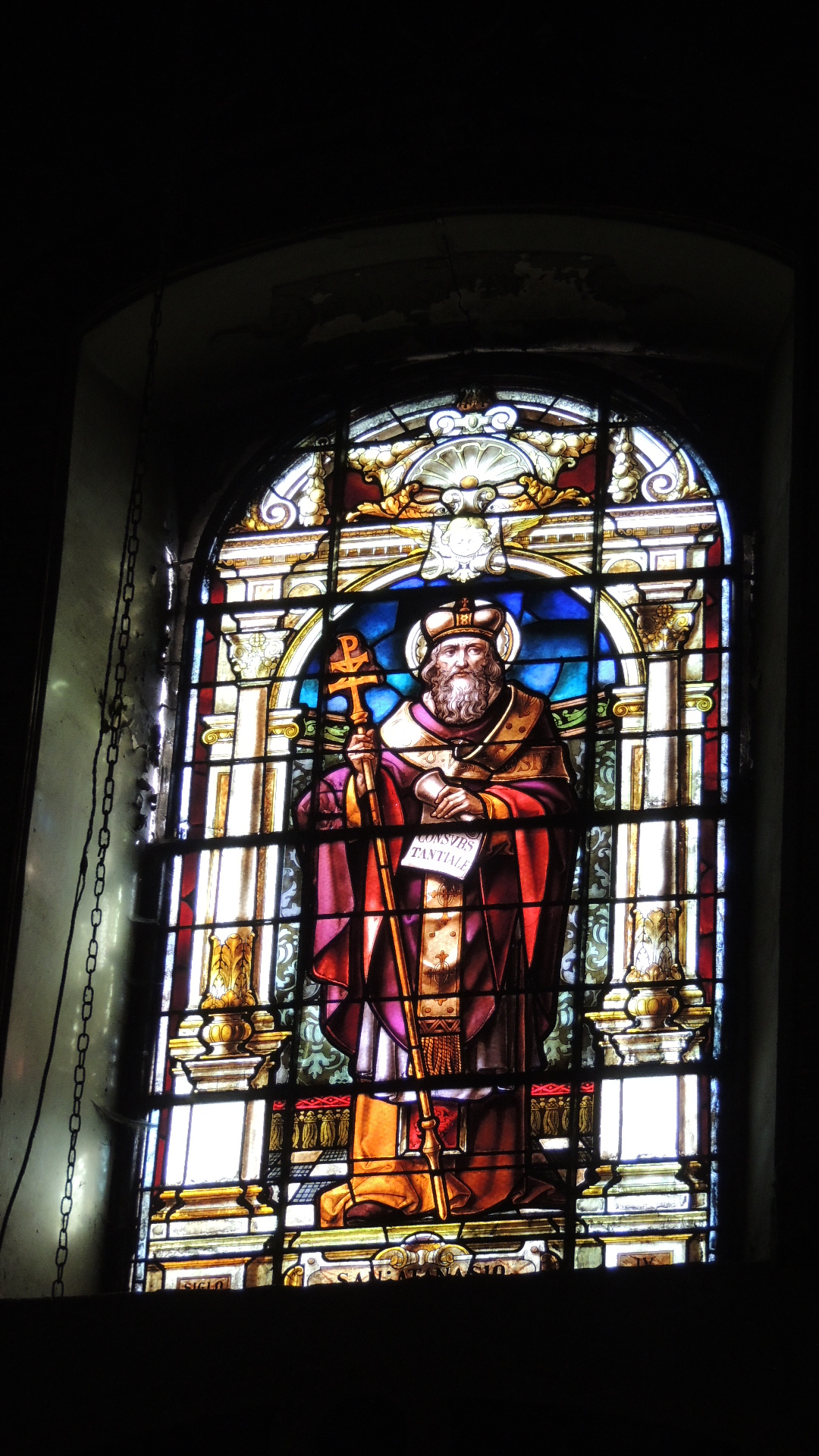
Saint Athanasius, 4th century (Jericó)

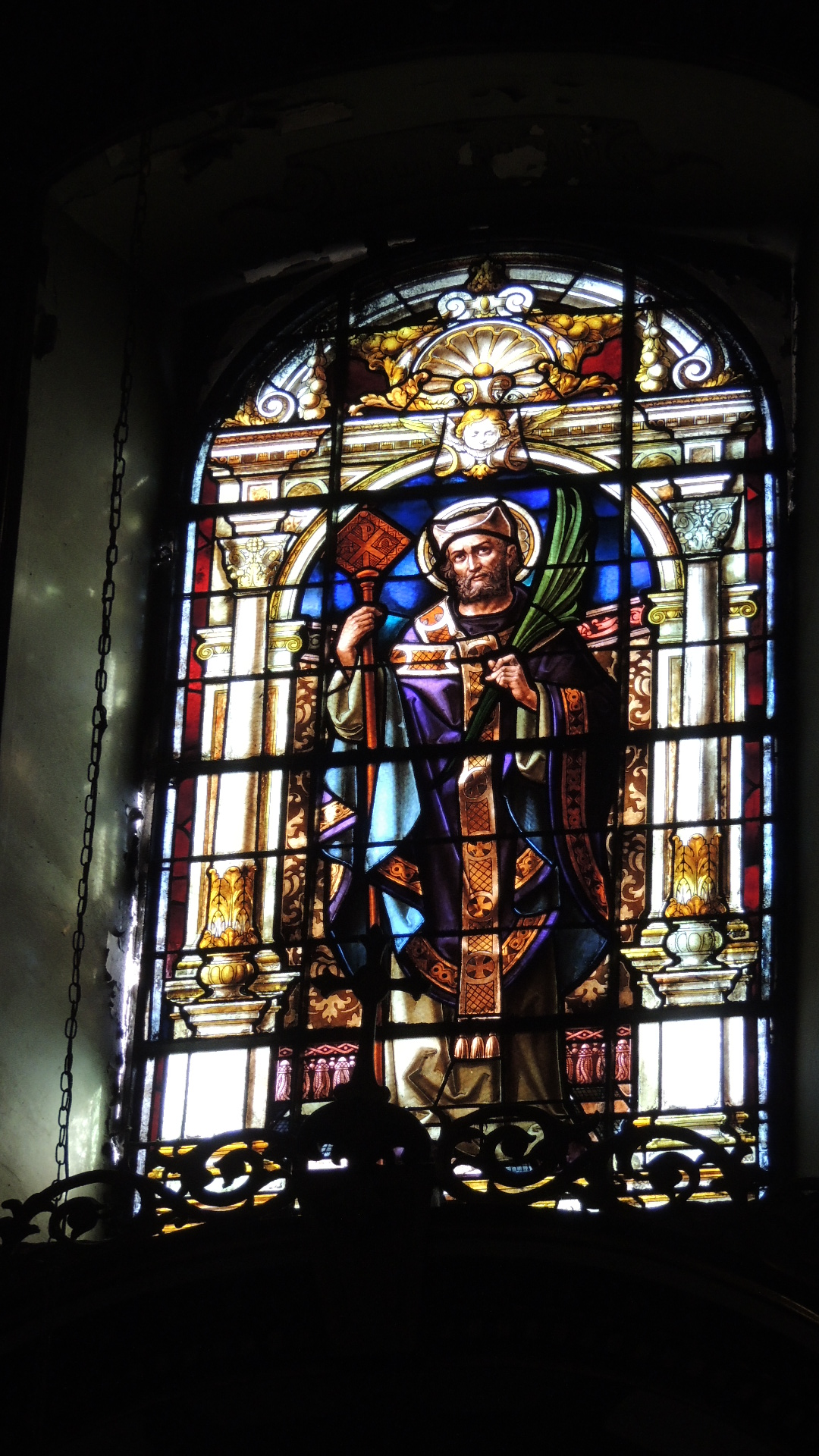
Saint Cyprian, 3rd century (Panama)

==== Stained glass windows of the choir loft and the south and north arms of the transept ====
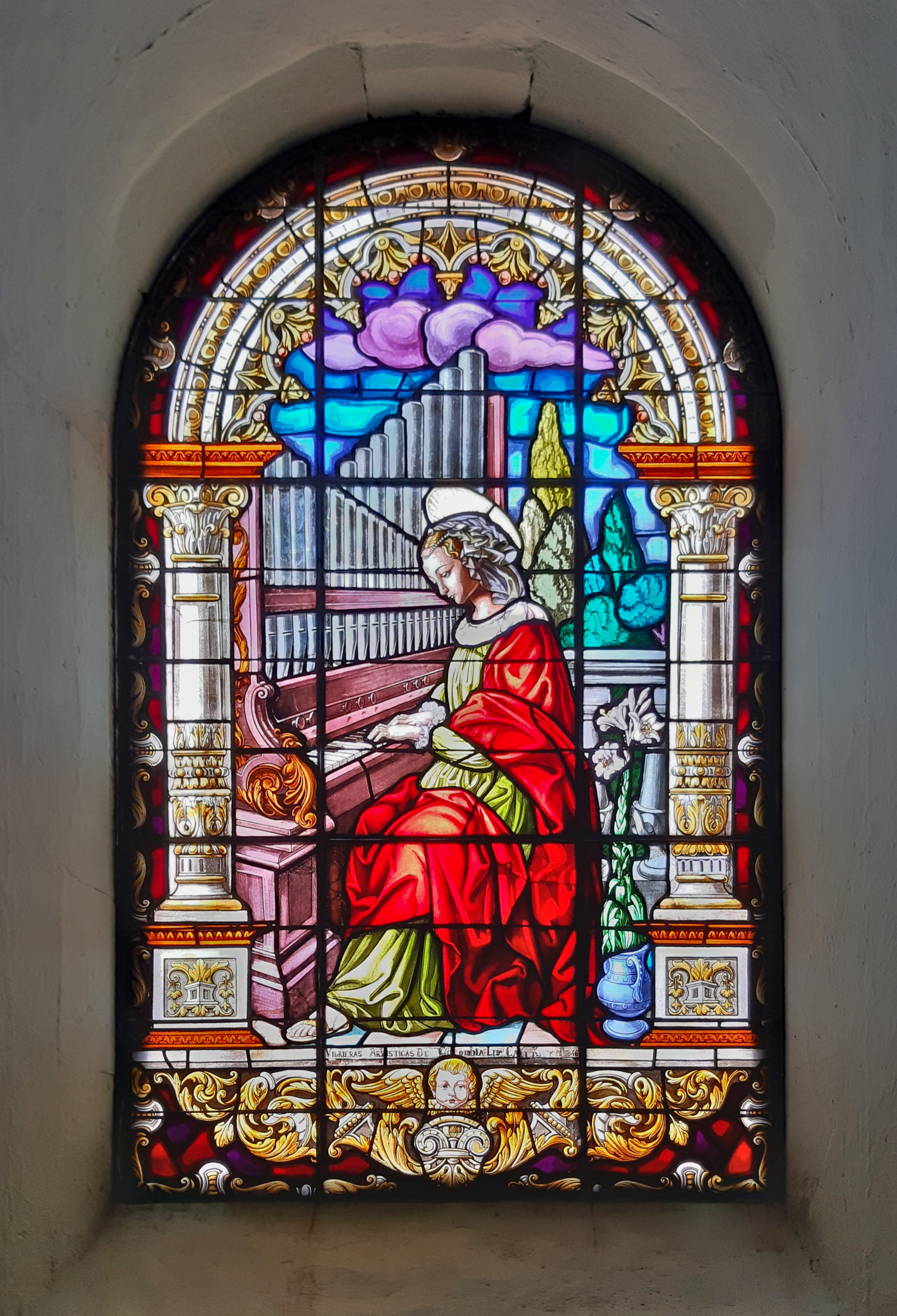
Left. Restored choir loft stained glass window with the image of Saint Cecilia.

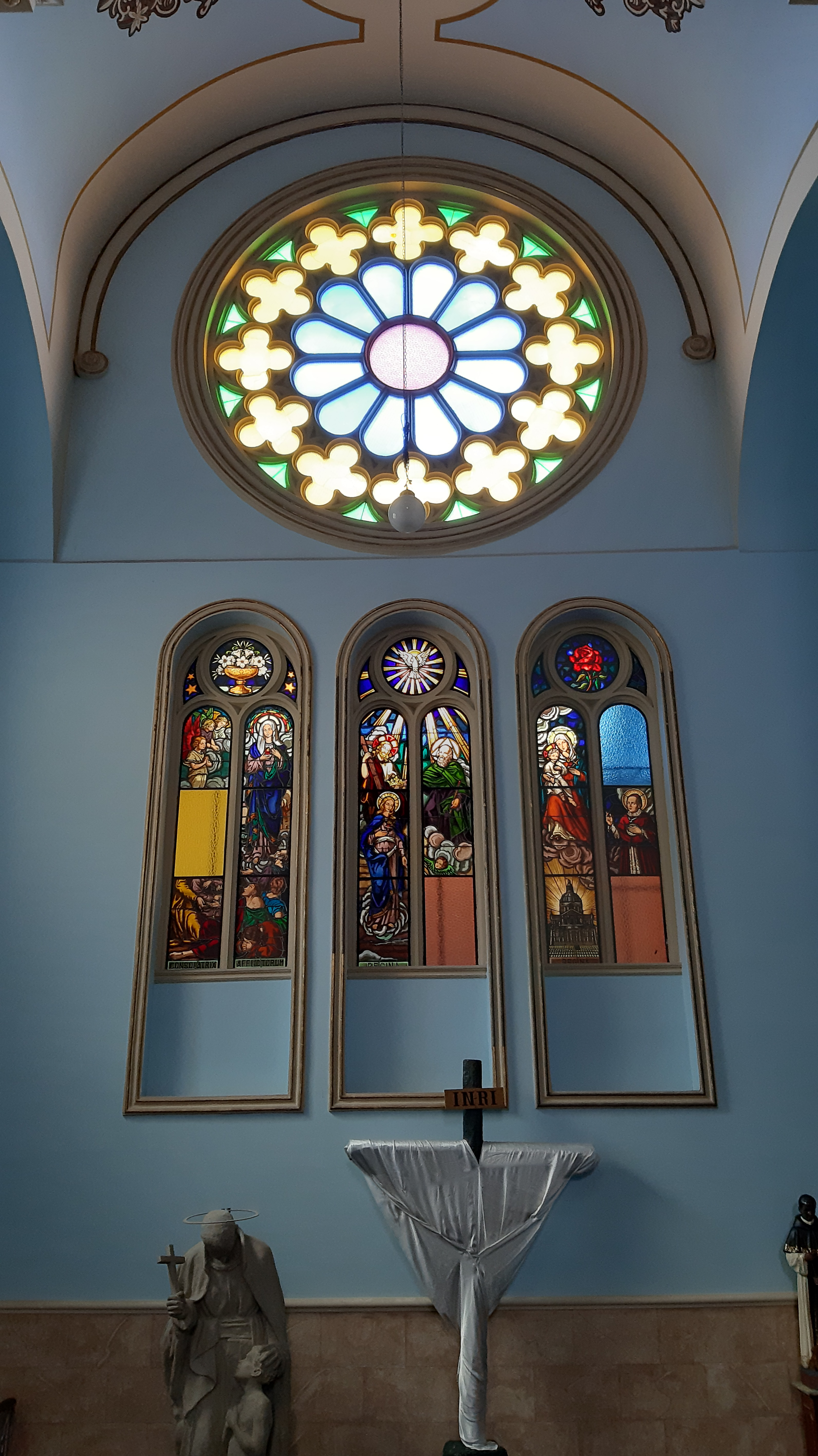
Center. Restored stained glass windows of the south arm of the transept.

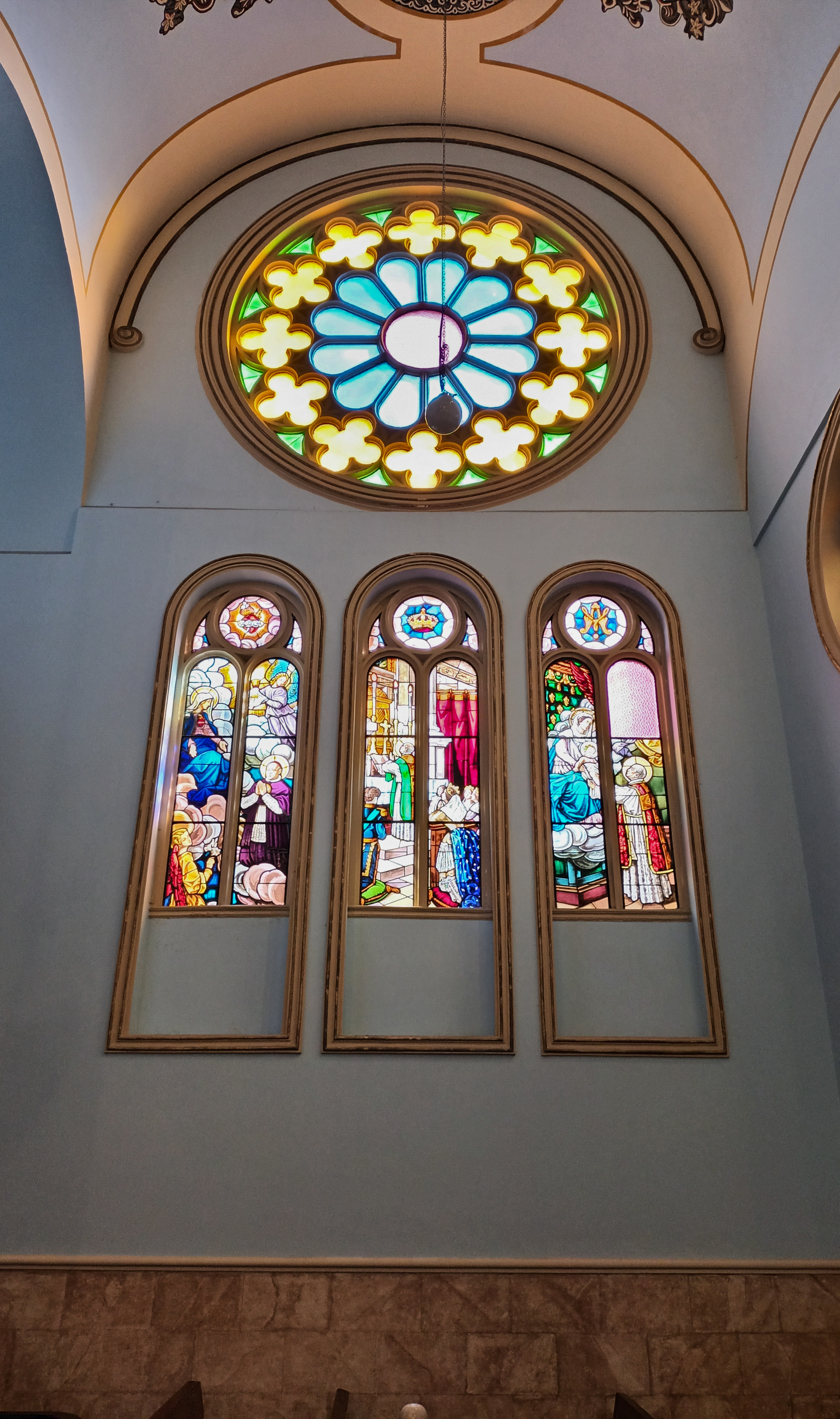
Right. Restored stained glass windows of the north arm of the transept.

In the choir loft, there is a painted glass stained glass window facing the main façade; its date of manufacture and installation is unknown; however, based on photographic records, it is concluded that it was not before 1938, as in the records from those years, that opening can be seen closed.

However, according to the inscription at the bottom of the stained glass window, it is known that it was made of painted glass by the "Vitrales Artísticos de Colombia" factory, located in Cali, at Carrera 8 No. 15-46. No further information about the factory is available, other than its location. The stained glass window has great chromatic richness, depicting Saint Cecilia, patroness of music, identifiable by her attributes iconographically represented as playing a musical instrument, especially a pipe organ, as can be seen in the window.

The stained glass window has a structure of flat mullions that serve as the main support and form a grid dividing the window into nine fields. Within each of these fields, the glass pieces are joined with lead and tin solder.

Before restoration, the Saint Cecilia stained glass window was generally in good condition, although it presented dirt, misalignments, and loose pieces, as well as occasional missing glass pieces located at one end that did not alter the scene of the work.

In the south and north arms of the transept, there are 6 stained glass windows, 3 on each side, for which there is also no record of the date of manufacture and installation, nor who made them, as they lack any signature; however, the similarity in colors and brushstrokes suggests they could have been made by the same house that made the choir stained glass window.

Currently, these stained glass windows are not complete; fragments are missing, due to the bomb explosion against the DAS building that occurred on 6 December 1989, and the one that suffered the most damage was the north arm window. The missing parts were replaced with corrugated colored glass.

In the stained glass windows of the south arm, we find the following images: Consolatrix Afflictorum, Regina Mundi, and Regina Apostolorum (with Saint Anthony Mary Claret). In the stained glass windows of the north arm, we have: Immaculate Heart of Mary, Isabel and Francis, and Legio Mariae. This series of stained glass windows shows scenes typical of medieval Marian iconography such as "Consolatrix Afflictorum" or "Regina Mundi" where Mary is crowned queen of the world and the Catholic Church. These scenes, however, are related to the devotion of Saint Anthony Mary Claret, who was very devoted to the Virgin Mary and founded the Missionary Sons of the Immaculate Heart of Mary, popularly known as Claretians.

Before restoration, these stained glass windows presented misalignments of the assemblies between pieces, accumulated dirt such as dust and particulate matter, as well as dirt related to candle combustion inside the temple. But the main problem they continue to suffer, despite that area of the temple already being restored, is the missing glass pieces that interrupt the visual fabric, making it difficult to read the scenes.

==== The Resplendent Sun stained glass window ====
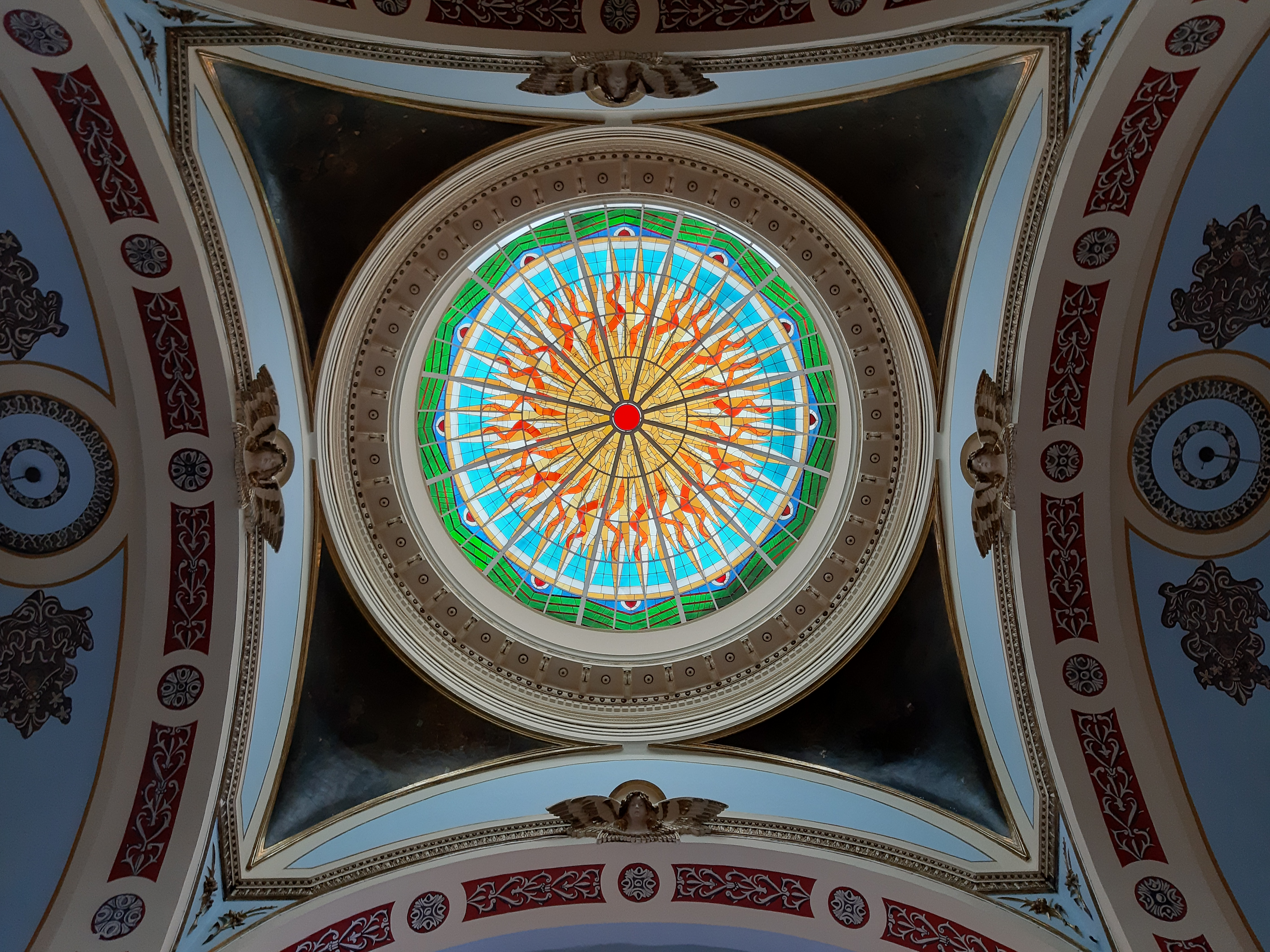
The fully restored Resplendent Sun stained glass window.

The temple has a double dome system; the exterior one has a very elongated drum upon which a glass dome with the colors of the Colombian flag rises; internally, there is a dome formed by a stained glass window 9.20 meters in diameter. The exterior dome cannot be considered a stained glass window as such, as it does not have the technical and artistic characteristics that indicate so.

In contrast, the Resplendent Sun stained glass window, allegorically representing Christ, is an interior dome resting on a cylindrical wall, made up of a structure of riveted metal profiles forming twelve semicircular sections that provide the main support for the stained glass. Each of these sections is further divided with metal strips running parallel and perpendicular to the main ribs. These elements are linked together by means of screws and nuts. This distribution, by sections, serves as a metal frame for placing the colored glass that makes up the stained glass window, which are joined with lead strips and fixed with lead and tin solder. There is no data on its author or manufacturer.

The stained glass window features a wide palette of yellows, reds, greens, and blues to create the image of a sun with wavy and straight rays, bordered by green waves. Most of these glasses are textured and have different finishes such as frosted, rain, or hammered. The relevance of the stained glass window lies in its central position, allowing it to be a source of light over the altar and main altarpiece, reinforcing them as the focal point of the temple. It is also a way to play with the metaphorical idea of Jesus as the light of peace.

Associating Jesus with the sun is recurrent in Christian art. These types of representations are quite primitive and, according to the iconology of Ripa, have a Roman origin in the Adventus or festival of the arrival of emperors. In the Bible, there are several references that associate or relate Jesus to the sun, such as: Jesus shone "bright as the sun" in the episode of the transfiguration (Mt 17:2). And when the Lord dies on the Cross, Holy Scripture says, the sun was eclipsed (Lk 23:45). And if Christ is the sun, by extension so must his disciples be, "the righteous will shine like the sun". Likewise, the Gospel of John (8:12) is fundamental to this iconography by quoting Jesus himself saying: "I am the light of the world". Other sources directly relate the solar representation to the vision of Saint Margaret Mary (known for having received the apparitions of the Sacred Heart of Jesus), who saw a sun born from the heart of Jesus.

Before restoration, the stained glass window presented serious problems; the frame showed plane deformations, missing parts, pitting corrosion and concretions, overpainting, and a large accumulation of dirt interfering with light entry. The stained glass showed weakening or loss of lead came, loss of color, scratches, streaks, a high degree of dirt, and missing glass.

Its restoration was carried out during the second phase carried out between 2018 and 2020, which covered the transept and the domes. The stained glass window was carefully dismantled, the glass added during inadequate interventions it suffered was removed, the plane was recovered, the fractured original glasses were rejoined, the lead came were recovered, and the dirt was removed. After this entire restoration process, the stained glass window regained its splendor.

== Other notable elements ==
=== Organ ===
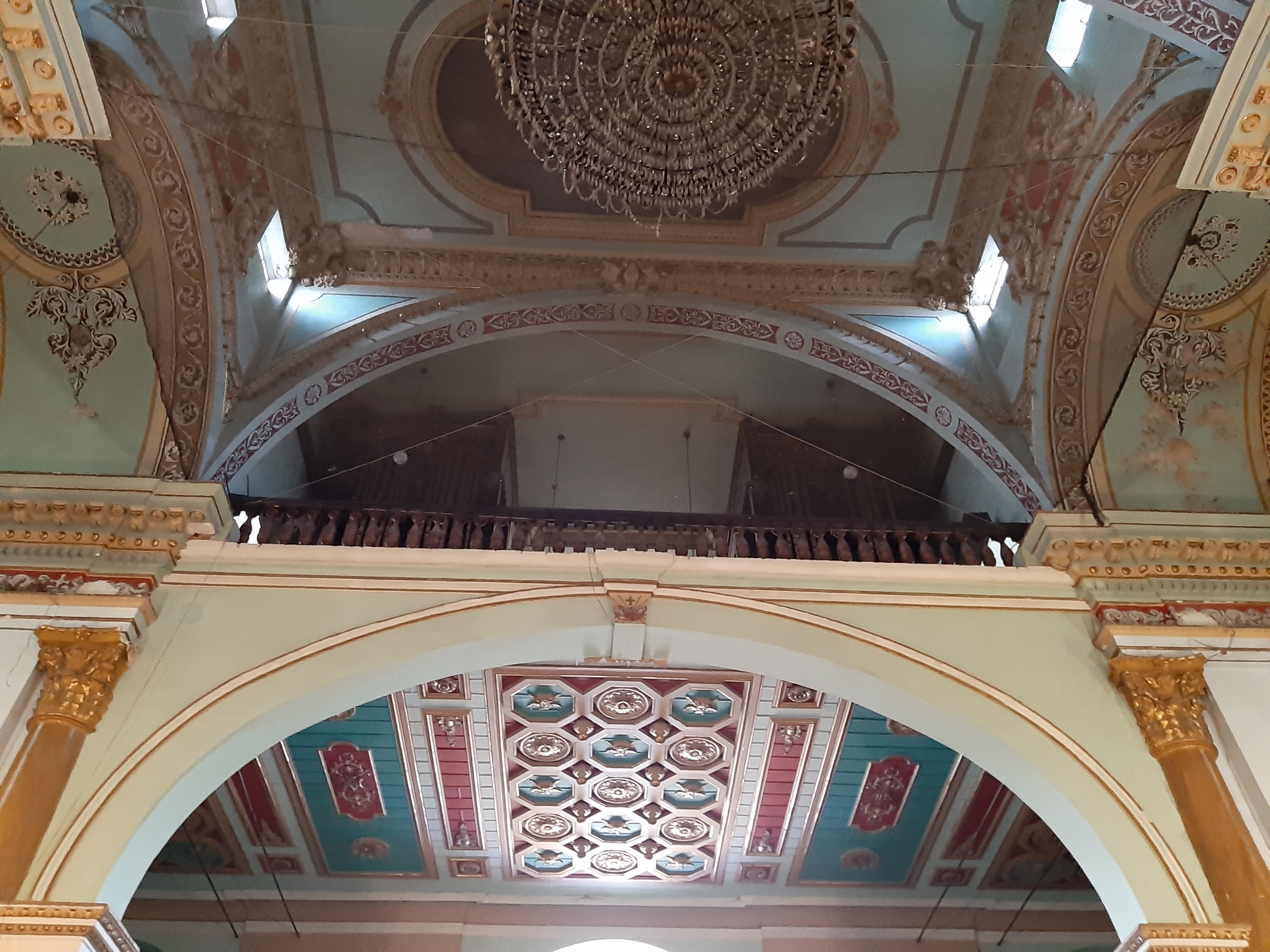
In the choir loft, the organ is located.

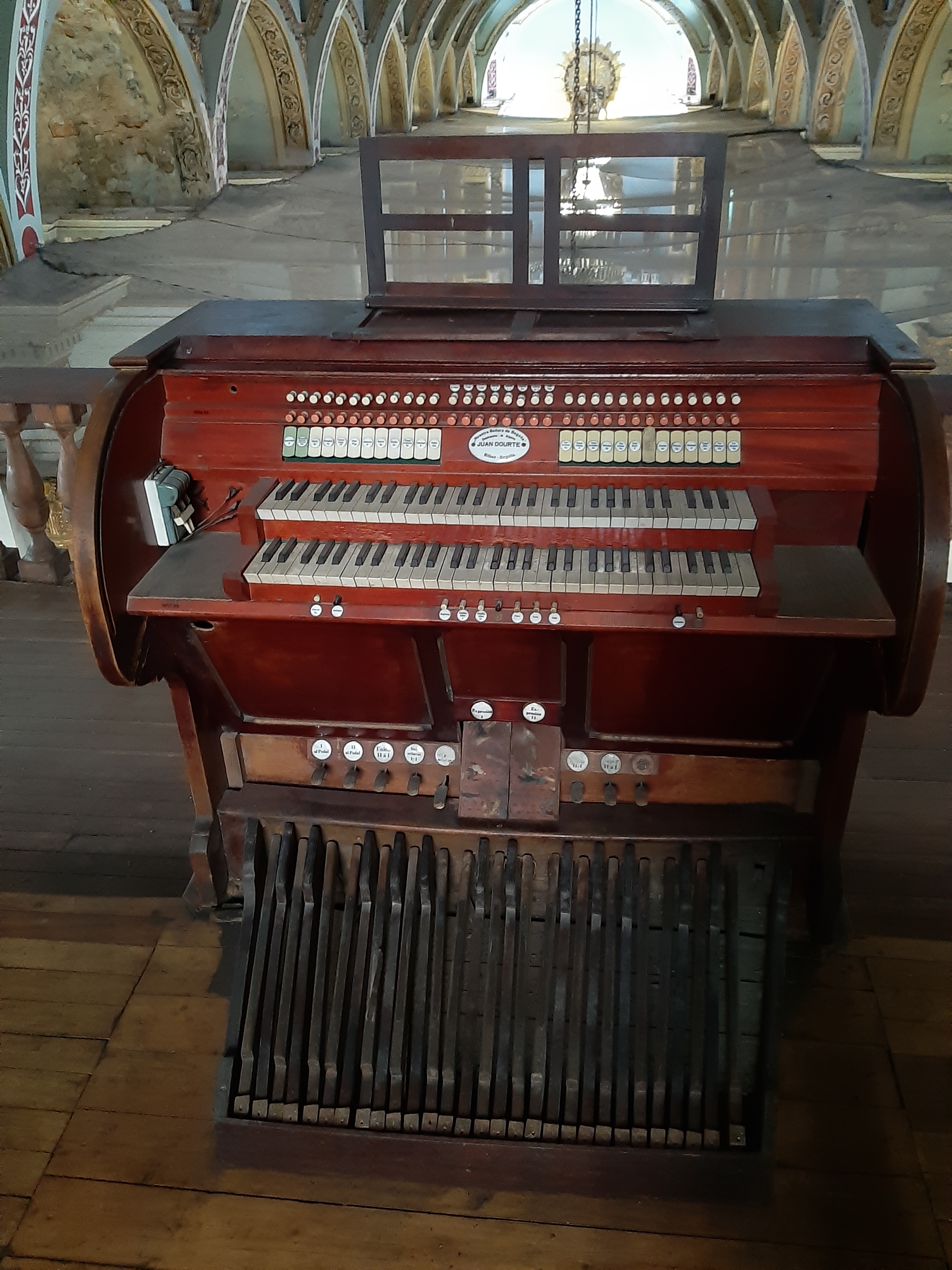
Organ console.

The stops (sounds) are managed from the console by means of the keys of the three keyboards, two manuals and the pedalboard.

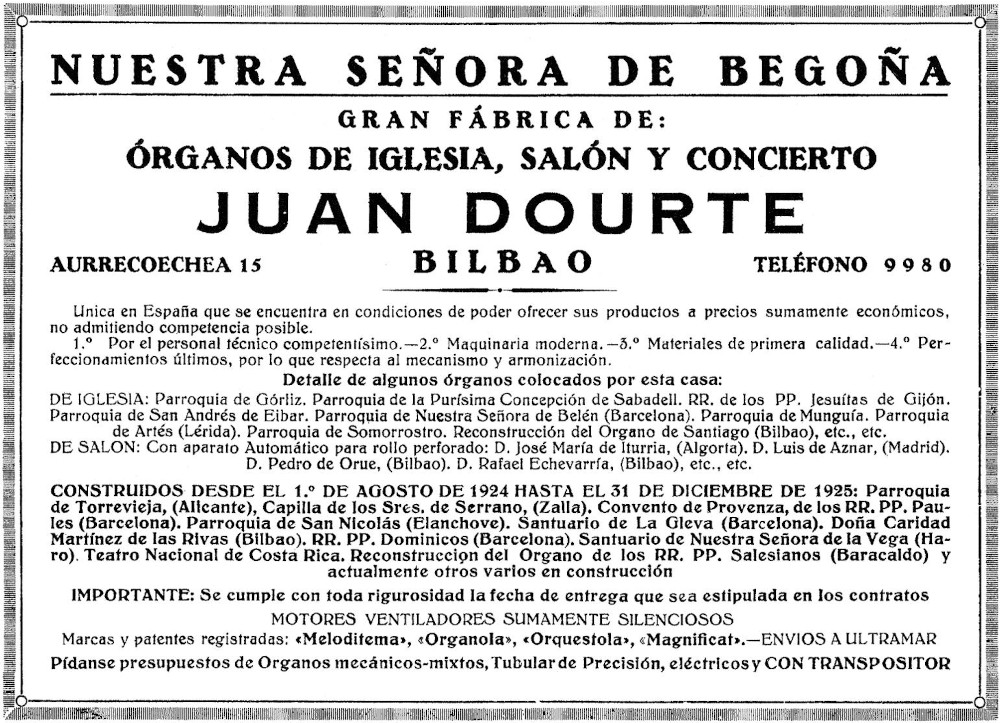
In the first decades of the temple's construction, there was an organ that was "occasionally obtained for 1,000 pesos, but it was not useful". Some time later, efforts were made to obtain a new instrument to give splendor to religious ceremonies. Finally, in 1932, the new organ arrived from Spain, built in Bilbao by the organ-building house "Nuestra Señora de Begoña" of Juan Dourte. (Note: Publicity advertisement from 1926 in a Spanish media outlet. Juan Dourte (1895-ca.1970) founded the "Órganos Nuestra Señora de Begoña" factory in 1924. In 1926, the new company headquarters building was inaugurated in Begoña (Bilbao) near the El Carmelo church (in the current Santuchu neighborhood), as very close by, Dourte had an important wood drying warehouse that greatly benefited his company. Juan Dourte studied organ building with the German master organ builder Juan Melcher, who came from the German house E.F. Walcker & Cie, and who later worked in Spain initially with Aquilino Amezua and later with Eleizgaray y Cía. In 1929, the Dourte house won a Grand Prize at the Barcelona International Exhibition. The Dourte house became a large company that built and worked on hundreds of instruments over more than fifty years of existence. The usual system they included in their instruments from the beginning was pneumatic, later evolving to electric, thus enabling the organist to use all kinds of couplers, combinations, pedals, and sound effects. Their advertising highlights the incorporation of the transposer and the possibility of choosing the operating system: mixed mechanical organs, precision tubular, and electric. These latter systems were very fashionable in Germany during those years. The sonority of these instruments is undoubtedly closer to late Romantic organs than to neoclassical ones, continuing the influences received from Aquilino Amezua and Eleizgaray.: santutxuzaharra.com, Fábrica de órganos Juan Dourte. With data taken from: La organería romántica en el País Vasco y Navarra (1856–1940) [Romantic Organ Building in the Basque Country and Navarre (1856–1940)], doctoral thesis by Esteban Elizondo. Retrieved 3 May 2024.) The instrument was made of polychromed wood, with metal strings and ivory. It was blessed on 7 August 1932 and cost 15,000 pesos.

The organ consists of 25 stops distributed across two manual keyboards and a keyboard played with the feet (pedalboard), which serves for the deep bass. It has 8 couplers combined with the three keyboards. All keyboards are arranged on a console, which is separate and placed in front of the organ with a view of the central nave. Its transmission is mechanical with an electric motor.

Its origin and authorship make the organ of the votive temple a piece of great quality, as Juan Dourte was a prominent Spanish organ builder and his factory was a renowned organ-building house that had won a Grand Prize at the Barcelona International Musical Exhibition in 1929. The factory operated from 1924 in Begoña (Bilbao), manufacturing instruments not only for Spain, but also for several American countries and the Philippines.

=== Crystal chandeliers ===
There are four crystal chandeliers, which were made by Talleres de Arte Granda, arriving in 1954 as part of the presbytery order.

=== Clock ===
In the tower of the main façade of the basilica is the clock, blessed and inaugurated on 21 August 1938 by Archbishop Ismael Perdomo Borrero, along with the temple's enlargement (transept, crypt, and dome). On the occasion of the inauguration of the enlargement and the celebration of the fourth centenary of the founding of the Colombian capital, the municipality of Bogotá presented the temple with the clock; this was ratified in Agreement 35 of the City Council, granting "authorizations to the executive to make the transfers required for the purchase of a clock for the Voto Nacional temple".

After installation, the clock was synchronized with the temple's smaller bells and with a statue of the Sacred Heart of Jesus, which, like a cuckoo, comes out at a certain hour; initially, it came out to indicate 7 in the morning, 12 noon, and 6 in the afternoon. However, the original sculpture that performed this task was replaced by one in resin and plaster, with a gilded finish and weather-resistant, probably due to the deterioration of the original. This sculpture is a gilded statue of Jesus standing, pointing with his left hand to his flaming heart, and his right hand raised in a blessing posture.

The instrument is a gravity-powered mechanical tower clock, manufactured by the renowned German company J. F. Weule in its factory in the town of Bockenem, Lower Saxony, a company that existed from 1836 to 1966. The instrument is characterized by having three dials or faces made of copper sheets, located on the north, south, and east sides of the tower, on which the hours are represented by Roman numerals, and a striking mechanism consisting of three bells synchronized with the mechanism.

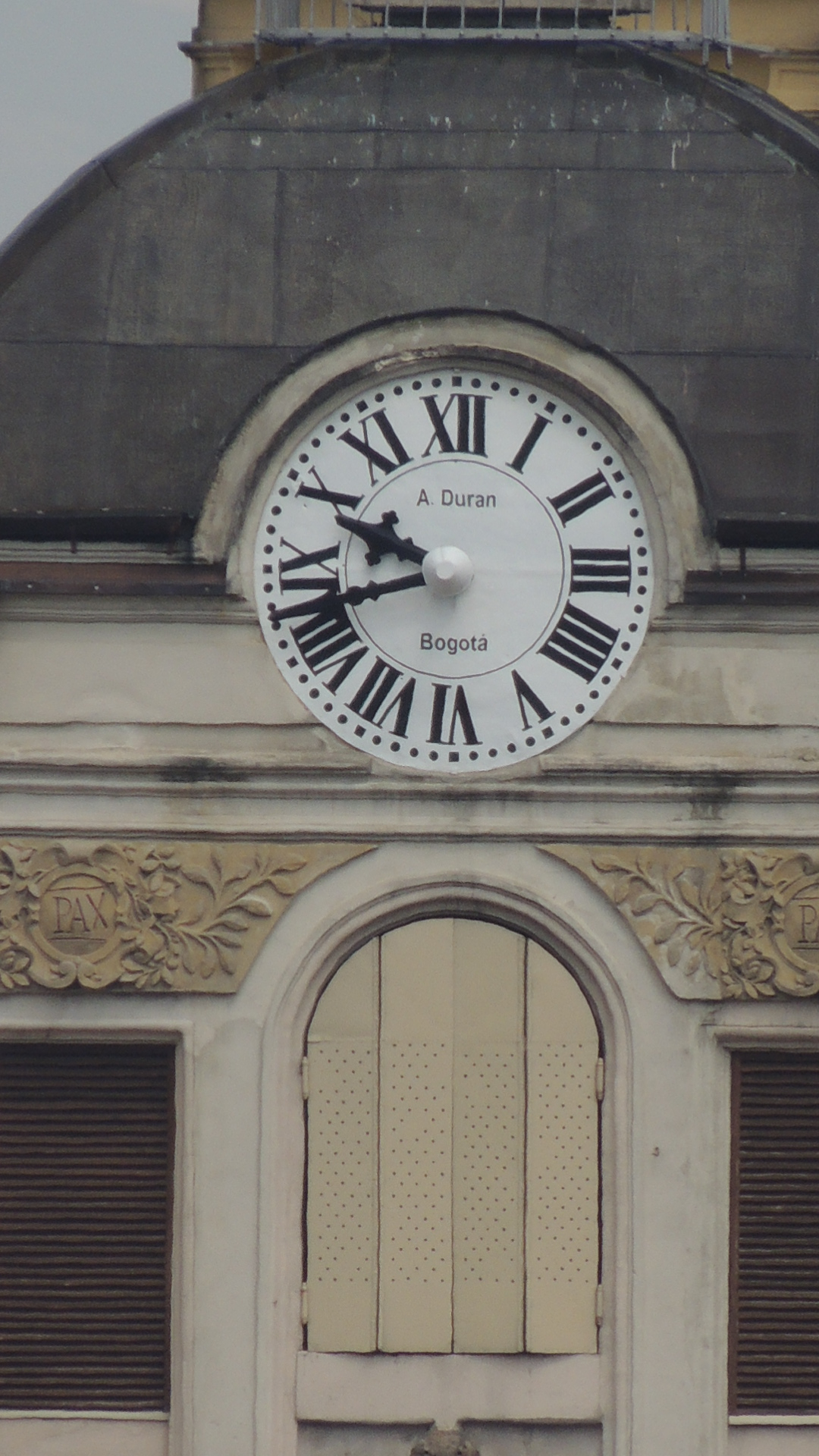
A

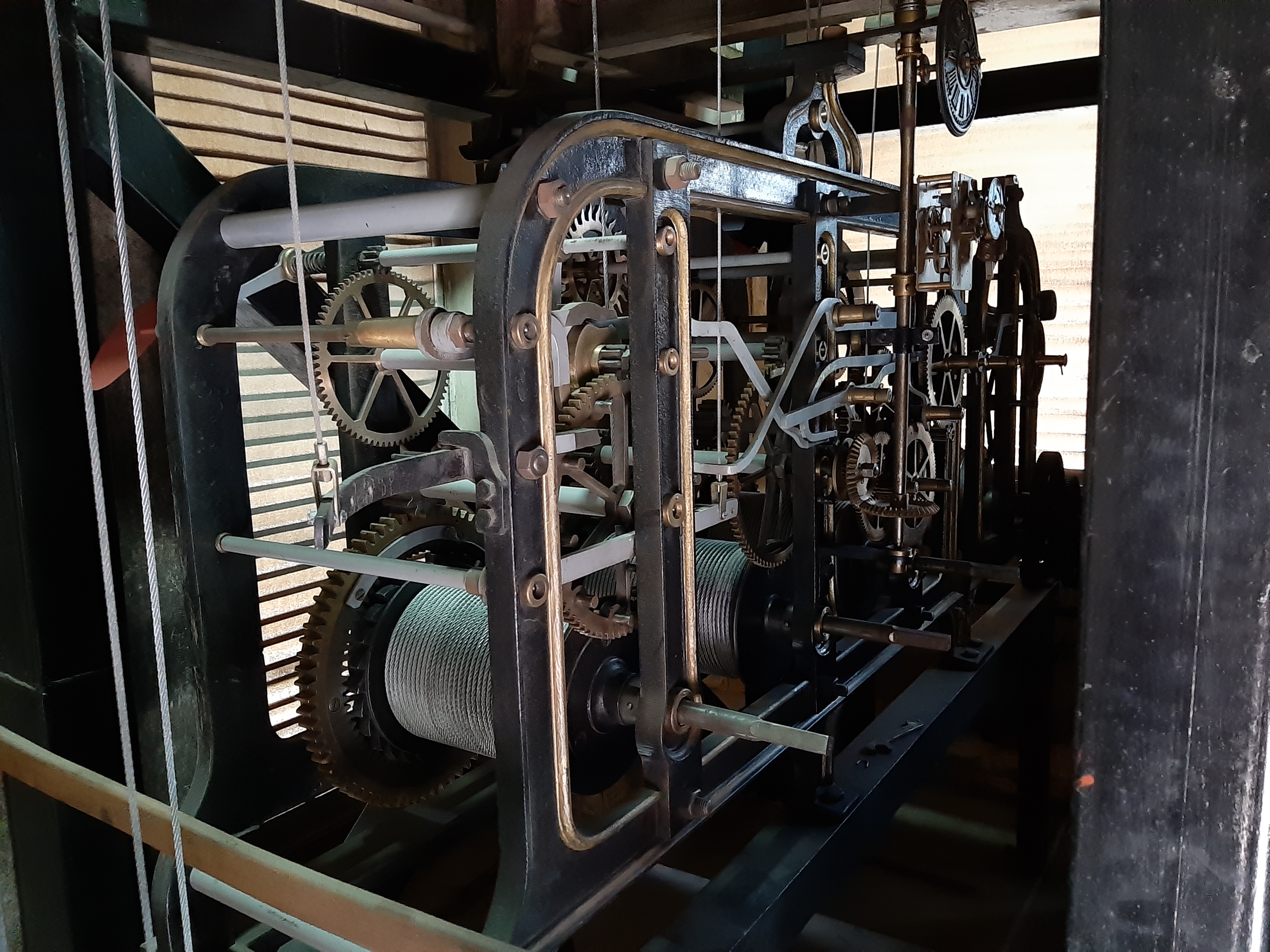
B

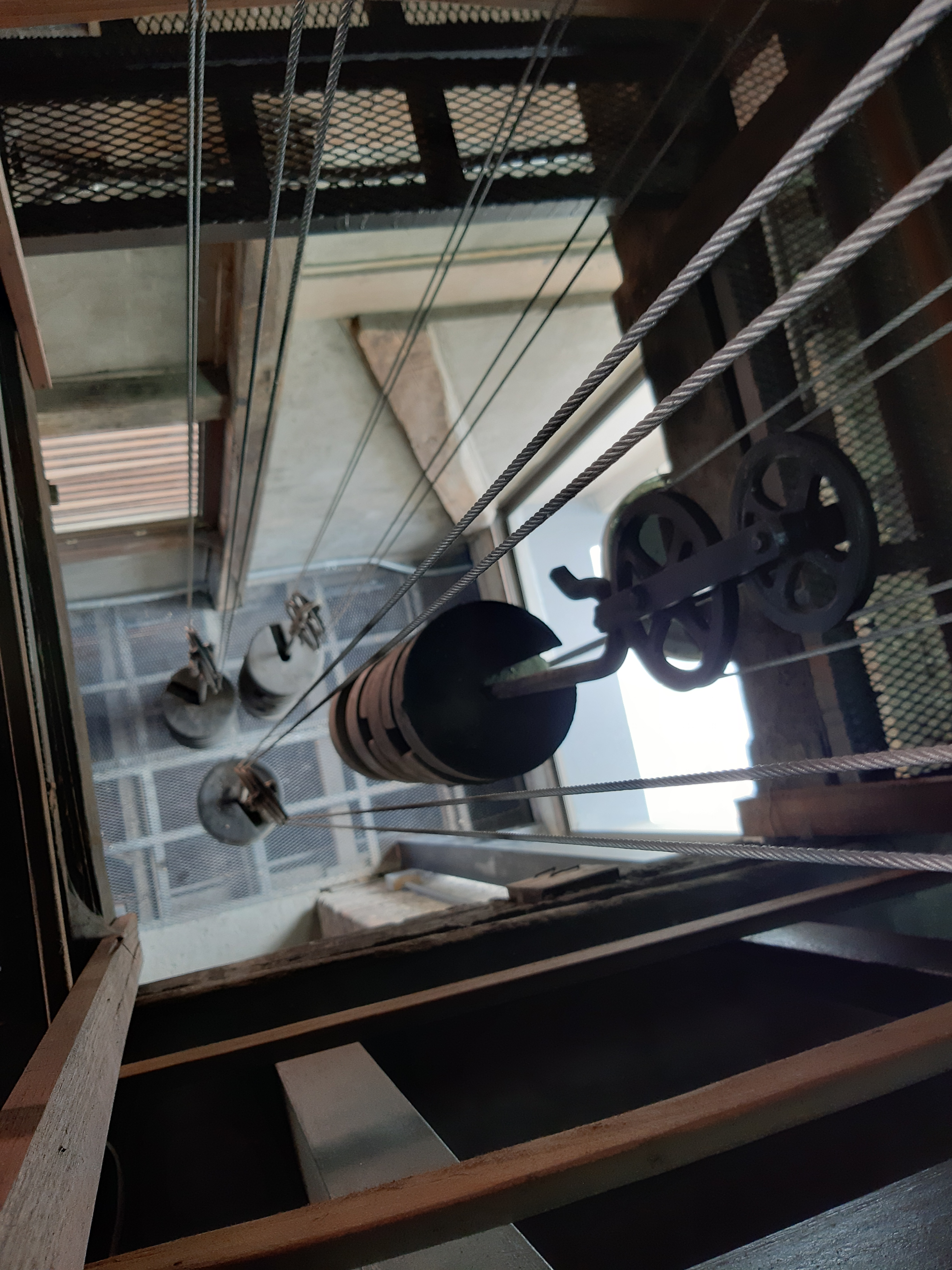
C

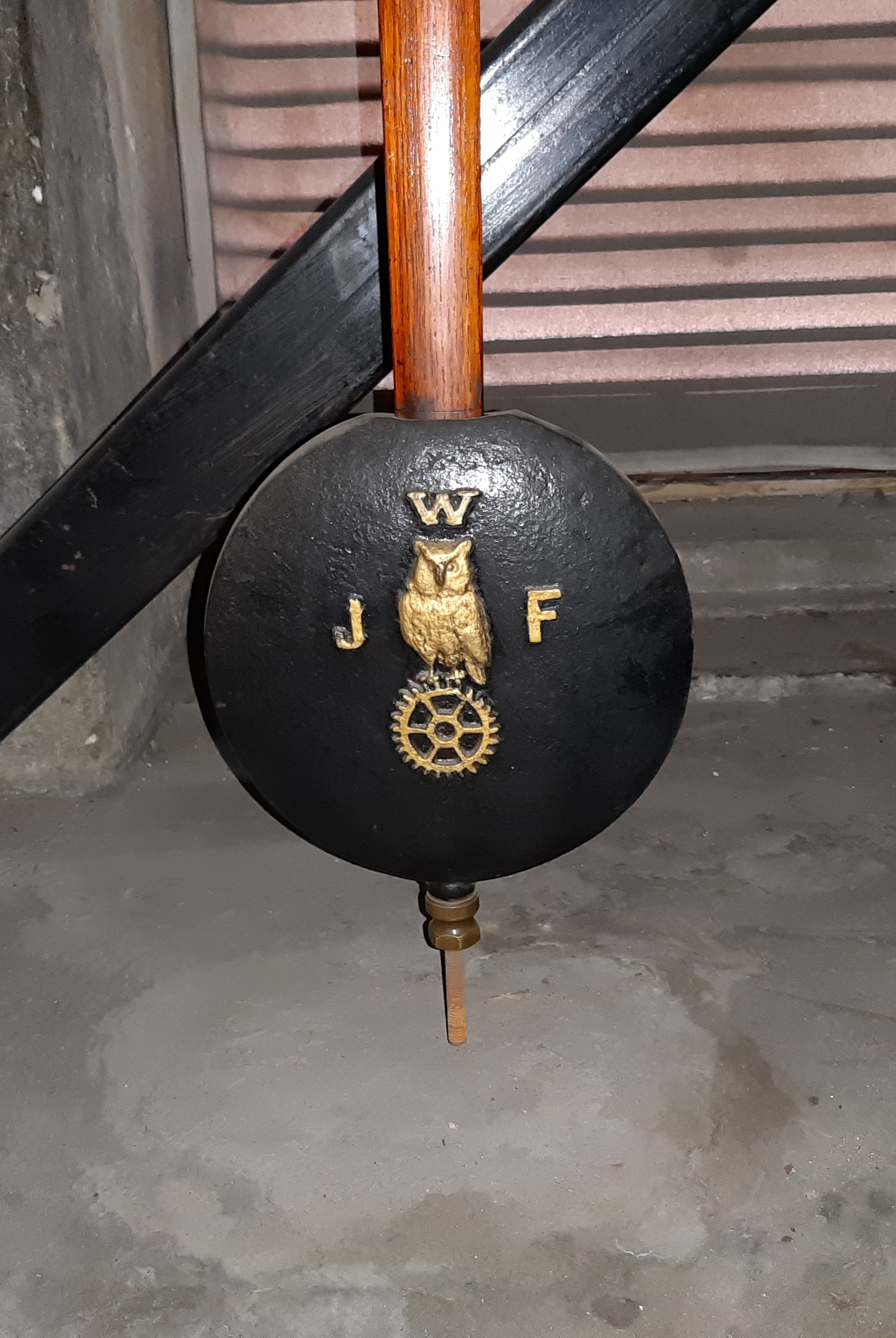
D

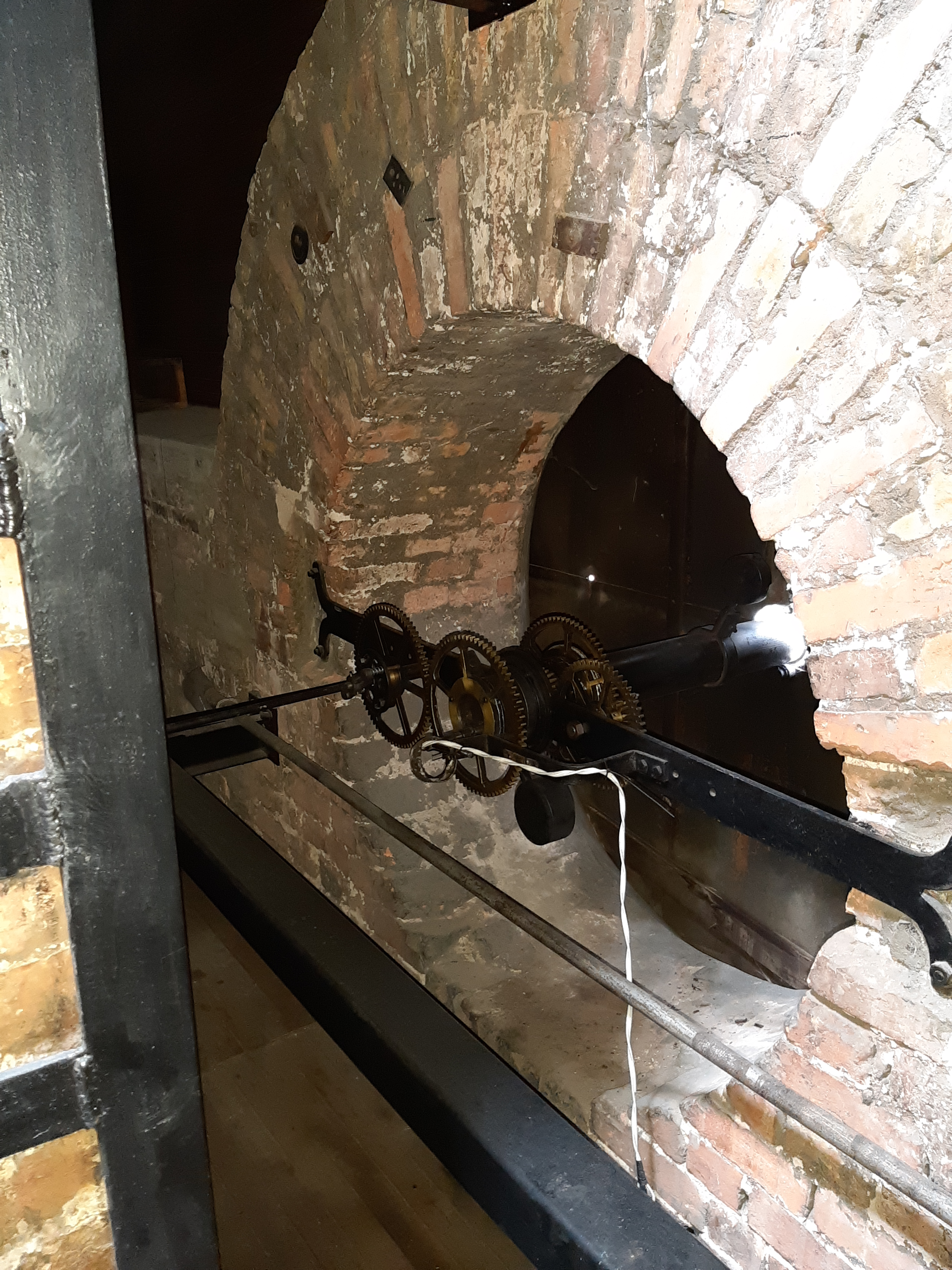
E

A: View of the eastern dial (main façade); at the bottom are the doors through which the statue of Jesus emerges like a cuckoo. B: View of the clock mechanism. C: Clock weight system. The weights hang from steel cables, using gravity to drive the mechanism. D: Clock pendulum with the logo of the German house J. F. Weule. E: Back of the eastern dial; the final mechanism that moves the clock hands can be seen, receiving commands from the main mechanism located below, on the floor immediately below. These commands arrive via a system of gears and transmission shafts.

The clock consists of two frames or cages of mechanisms. The main and larger one has three sections corresponding to the quarter-hour mechanism, which strikes the bells every 15 minutes and uses two bells for the bim bam; the hour mechanism, which strikes the largest bell the number of times corresponding to the hour; and the time mechanism, located in the center of the cage, which moves the hands, i.e., measures time, and is also the master mechanism. The second cage contains the mechanism that operates the door and the tray carrying the statue of Jesus to the outside; it can be programmed to come out as many times as desired. The cages are made of cast iron, the gears are bronze, and the shafts are iron. The pendulum bob is made of cast iron, and the rod holding it is wooden. The entire assembly was placed on a metal "table", with dimensions corresponding to the movement and protection of the pendulum.

Access to the clock is via a spiral staircase from the choir to the belfry; behind two small wooden doors is the operating mechanism. On one of these doors, a document dated 12 February 1989 is attached, detailing the care of the instrument and mentioning the four mechanisms of the clock. Additionally, it indicates that the cuckoo mechanism is operated with ropes and how the movement should be performed for the statue to come out correctly. (Note: Instructions for the maintenance of the Voto Nacional Bogotá clock: "if this is fulfilled, there will be a clock for many years". Given at the Voto Nacional on 12 February 1989. Rogelio Morcillo and his brother José Humberto. Document attached to one of the access doors to the clock in the belfry tower.) Currently, this winding system is no longer preserved and was replaced by a tray that works mechanically by means of wheels.

In the first stage of the temple's restoration, which focused on the façade body, the clock was also intervened. But before this process, the instrument was, in general terms and without considering its particular mechanical functioning, in good condition. From an exclusively material point of view, it presented slight wear of its parts, something natural due to its years of operation, and also small points of corrosion on some metal parts, which are explained as normal alterations of these metals (mainly bronze and iron) due to interaction with the environment.

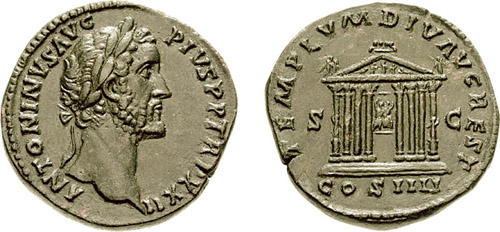
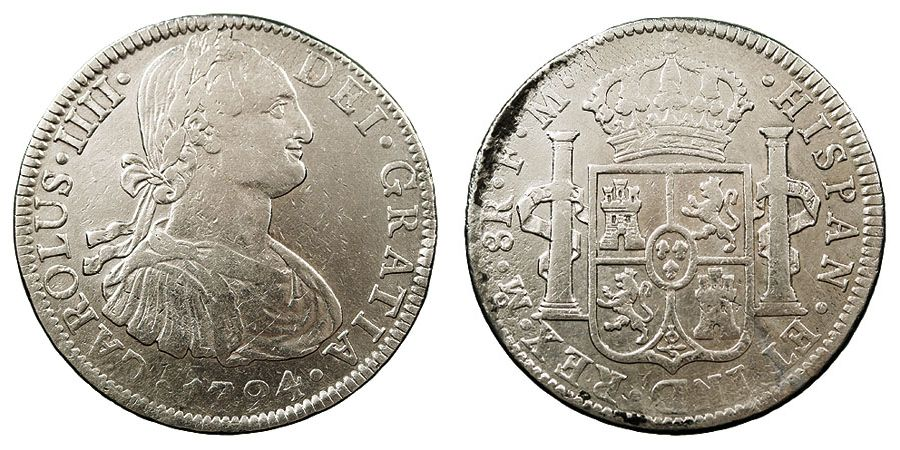
Finally, the clock was restored in November 2017 by the renowned clockmaker Juan Carlos Llano Sendoya, who carried out meticulous restoration work. In this process, upon stripping the dials, it was found that they had undergone alterations; specifically, it was discovered that the number 4 was originally represented by "IIII", (Note: Sestertius of Roman Emperor Antoninus Pius: the reverse bears the indication "COS IIII" instead of IV (COS means consul). 8 reales from 1794 using IIII instead of IV as the reign number of Charles IV of Spain. Clockmaker's 4. It is common to see the use of IIII for the numeral 4 on many clock faces, instead of the correct IV, for which there are several theories: historical, aesthetic, and practical. The Roman numeral system, derived from that used by the Etruscans, was initially based on the additive method (I plus I were II, V plus I were VI, and II plus II were IIII). Over time, they decided to start using the subtractive method in which the preceding number subtracts its amount from the following one. Thus, instead of writing 4 as the sum of 2 plus 2 (IIII), it came to be written as 5 minus 1 (IV). Even so, in ancient Rome they continued to write IIII. And in fact, they preferred to use it this way out of superstition. In Latin, IV corresponds to the first two letters of the Roman god Jupiter (IVPPITER), the most important god in Roman mythology (his Greek equivalent is Zeus), and the Romans considered using IV to denote a number to be inappropriate and impious. Thus, the use of IIII was (and is) not incorrect. Likewise, the set IIII creates a visual symmetry on the dial, since the symbol I is the only one appearing in the first four hours, V appears in the next four hours, and X in the last four, providing a symmetry that would be altered if IV were used. Also for convenience, as IV is more difficult to read given its position on the clock face, being almost upside down (the figure IV could be confused with VI in that position). Among the many stories linking a monarch to the fact that the 4 on clocks is written IIII, the most credible stands out, which says that in 1370, the clockmaker Henry de Vick was commissioned to make a clock to be installed in the tower of the Royal Palace of France (known as La Conciergerie or the Palais de la Cité), and upon delivering it, King Charles V (called the Wise) reprimanded him for having represented the 4 as IV. The clockmaker pointed out that this was how it was written, but Charles V replied angrily: "The King never errs". The clockmaker had to change the representation of the 4 to IIII, and according to this story, since then clocks began to represent the 4 in this way.: López, Alfred (15 March 2012). "¿Por qué en algunos relojes el 4 aparece escrito IIII y no IV?". Periódico 20 minutos.) which is usual in this type of large-format clocks, and for some unknown reason was changed to "IV"; it was also discovered that initially the faces had the inscriptions "A. Duran" at the top and "Bogotá" at the bottom, which were covered with paint. It is unknown what they refer to, whether it could be an allusion to the importer/distributor of the clock. After the restoration process, the dials recovered their original appearance. The statue of Jesus was programmed to come out every day at 9 am, 12 noon, and 3 pm.

=== Bells ===
The basilica's belfry currently has five metal bells, each marked with a date and factory stamp. The first recorded bell was donated in 1913 by "a lady named Salustiana de Aldana, who had no more protection after God than a stall in the market square; with her savings, she managed to pay for the first bell, which cost her the sum of 333 pesos."

However, this bell is no longer preserved; it was most likely replaced by the set of three bells that arrived in 1931 from Germany. This set consists of two small ones (approx. 40 cm high) and a medium one (approx. 60 cm high). The three bells are made of bronze, made by "Mefecerunt Franzfelillingsóhne Auolda Germania", and are currently part of the clock's striking mechanism in the belfry; however, they are the pieces that first arrived at the church of the entire clock mechanism, given that the clock would arrive seven years later. The bell sound system consists of external hammers striking them to produce the chimes, which are activated by pinions and chains from the clock mechanism.

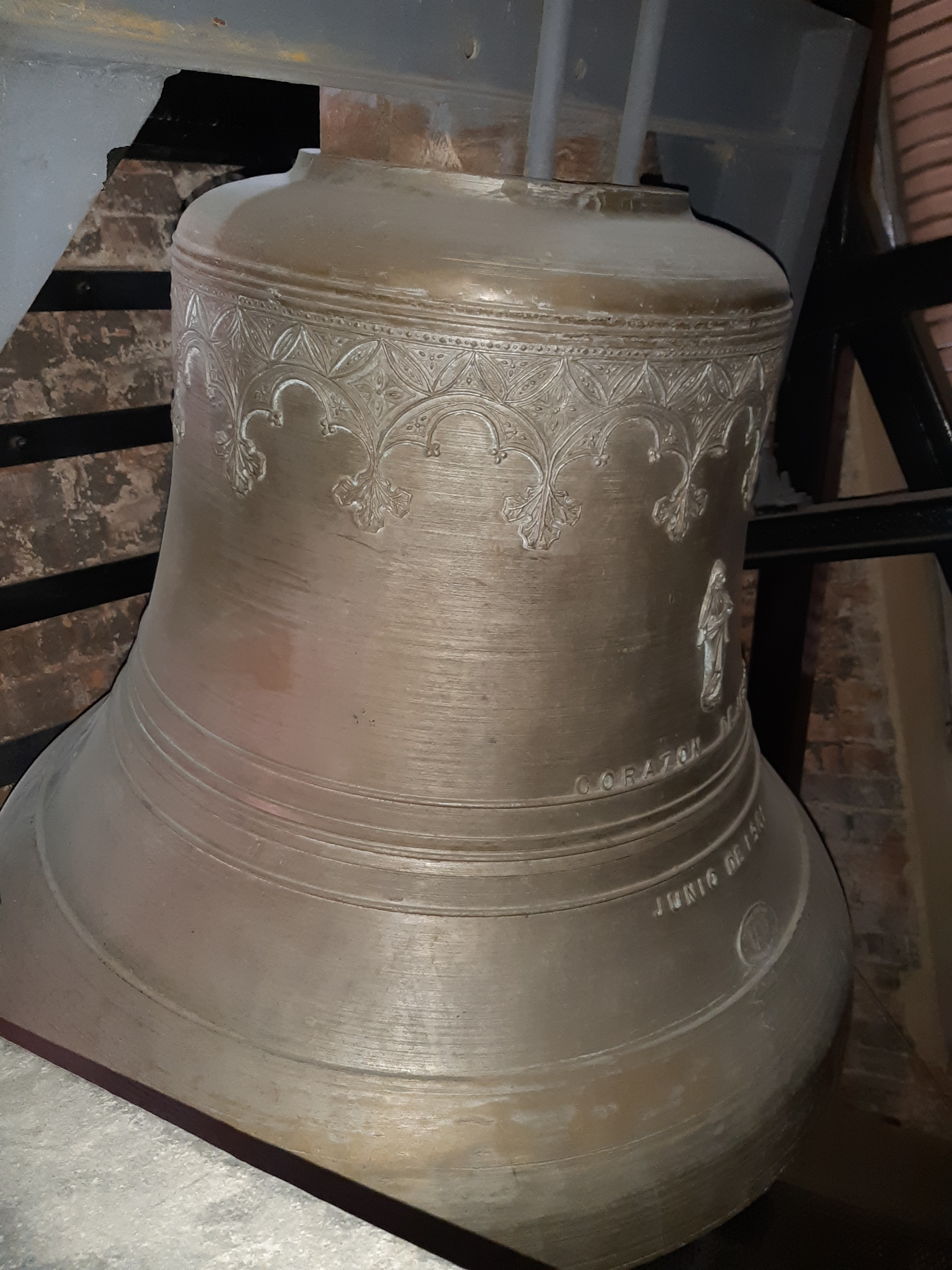
A

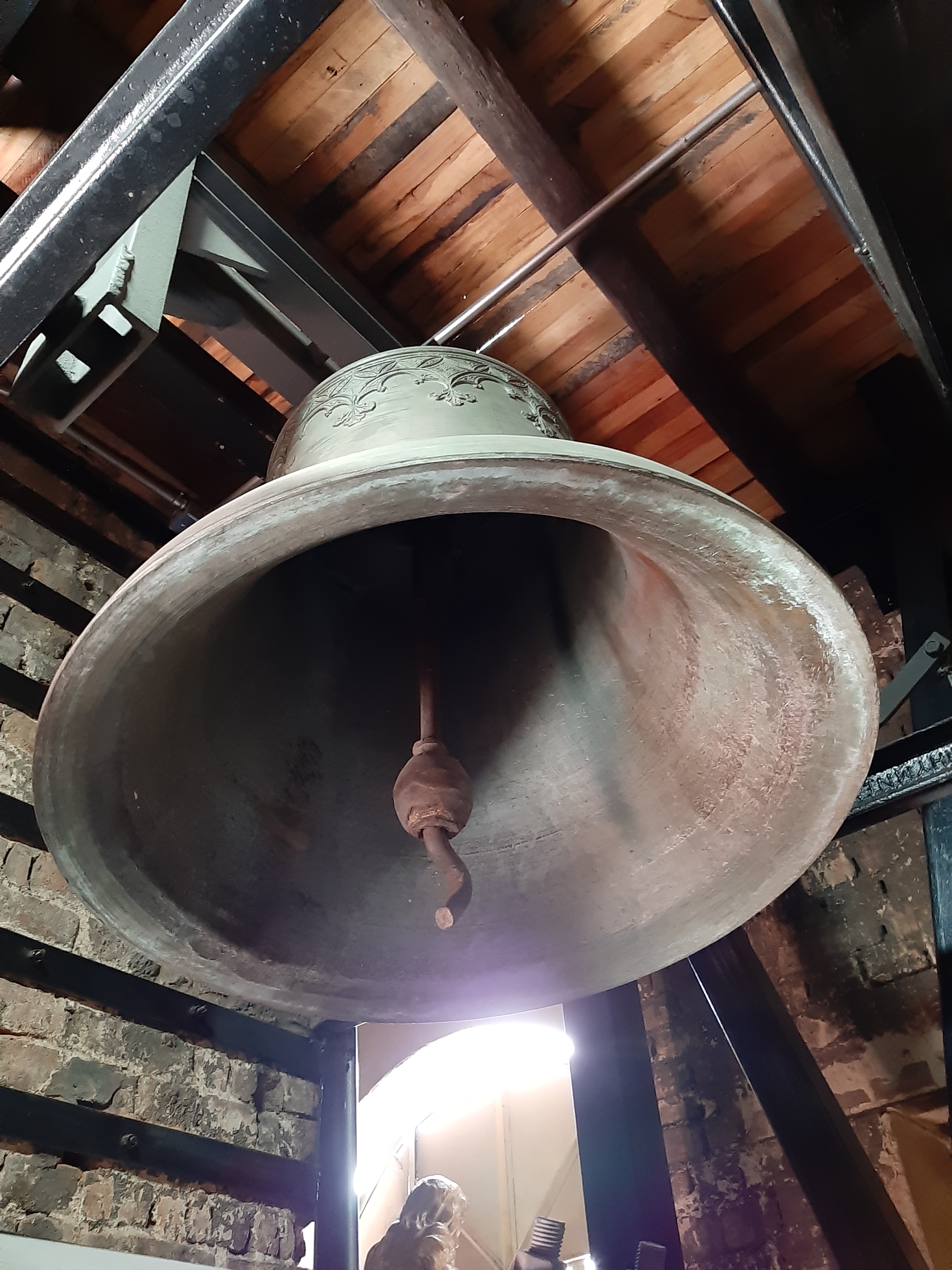
B

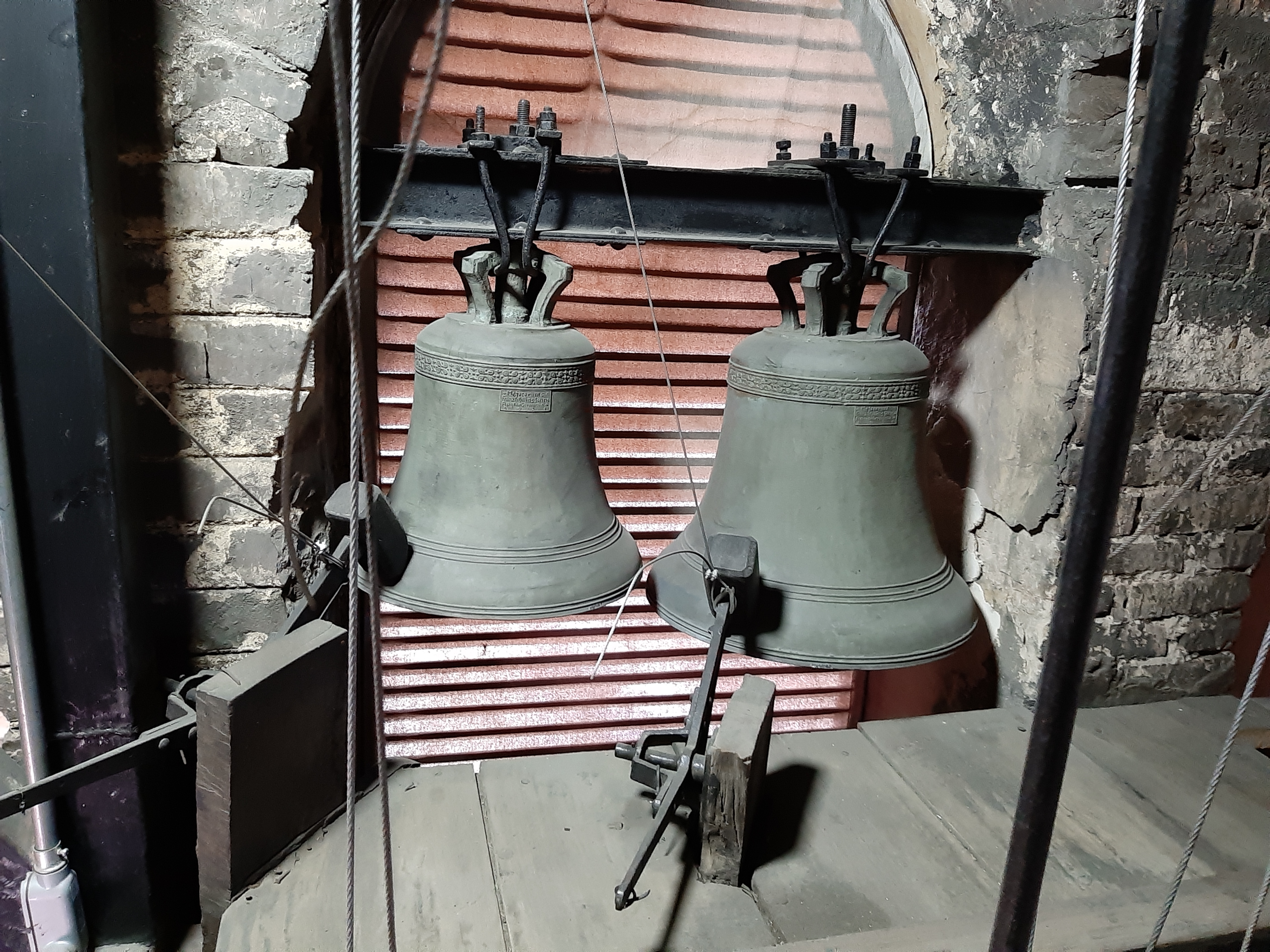
C

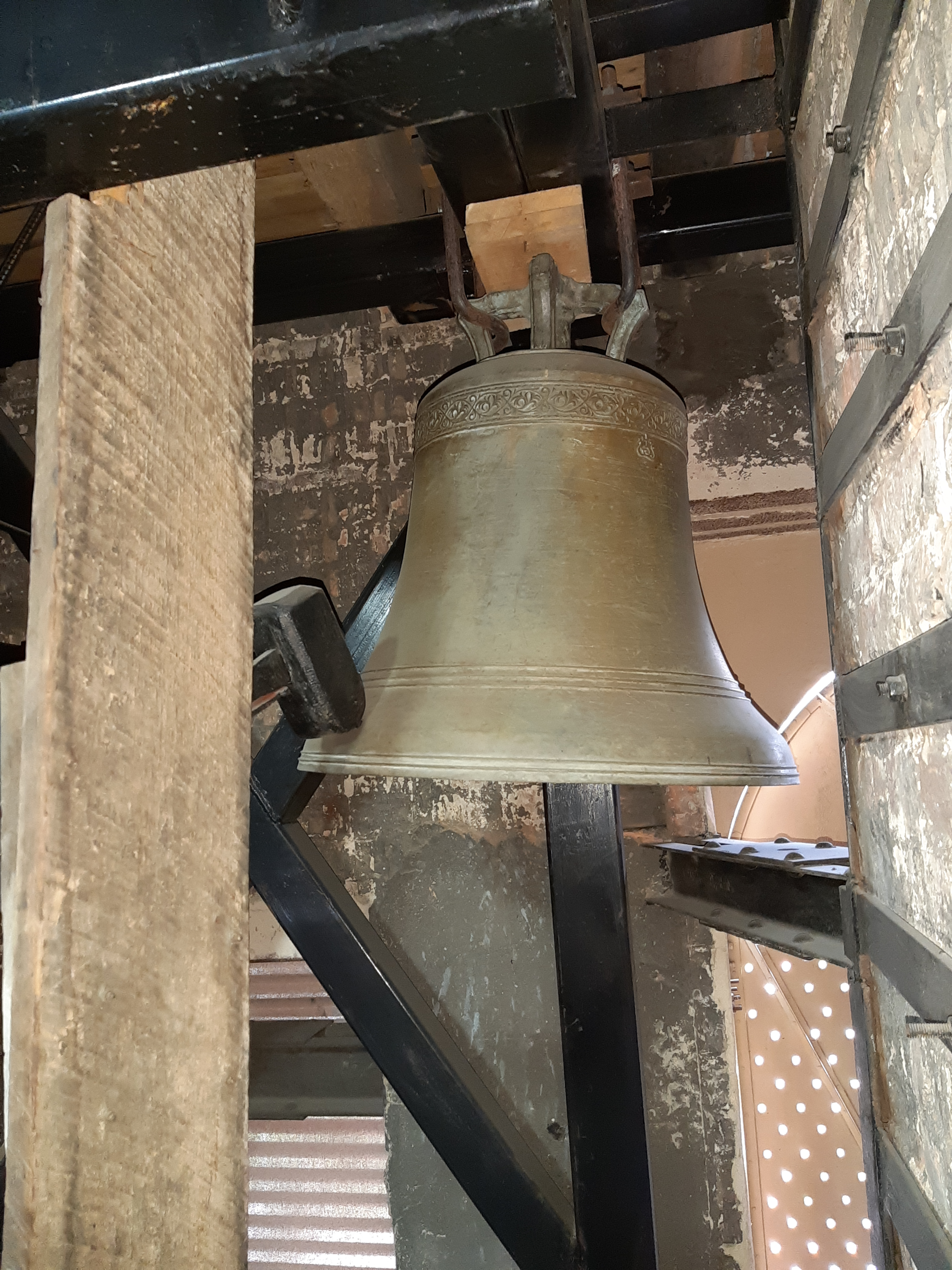
D

A: Bell "Corazón de Jesús". B: Bell "Corazón de María". C and D: Bells of the clock chime; the hammers that make them sound can be seen. C: Bells used to announce the quarter hours with a bim bam. D: Bell that announces the hours with the number of chimes corresponding to the hour.

Three decades after the arrival of the German bells, two larger bells arrived from Spain, made of bronze, one called "Corazón de María" and the other "Corazón de Jesús", manufactured in June 1961 by the renowned workshop of the Portilla Brothers in Santander, Spain. (Note: The Portilla Brothers Workshop is a Spanish family business specializing in the manufacture and repair of bells for several generations. Thanks to their experience in bell casting, the workshop also produces bronze sculptures and plaques with reliefs. In the past, due to the weight and difficulties of transport, bells had to be made near the temple for which they were intended. Therefore, each year, the bell masters would divide up the regions of Spain that each would cover. Once they had a destination, the master craftsman would travel there with some of his sons. They would contact the priest in charge of the area, who would convey the orders, and they would stay in the area for several months, dedicating themselves to manufacturing. The extension of the railway allowed the family business to settle permanently in Gajano, south of Santander, in 1960. During this time, much of the traditional competition disappeared as parishes opted for industrially made bells. But the Portilla Brothers workshop managed to survive thanks to its commitment to the quality provided by its artisanal production system. The bells are made using the ancient lost-wax casting technique, which allows each bell to have a unique style and sound adapted to the preferences of each region. Besides Spain, they have sold in France, the Dominican Republic, Peru, Brazil, and Colombia.: Moreno Saiz, Víctor M. (12 December 2022). «Fundición de Campanas Hnos. Portilla». Red de Patrimonio Industrial de Cantabria. Retrieved 3 May 2024.) Their sound system is swinging; therefore, each has its own clapper that sounds them when swung. This system is activated from the sacristy by electrical equipment and is used to announce religious services, hence they are also called liturgical bells.

=== Baptismal font ===
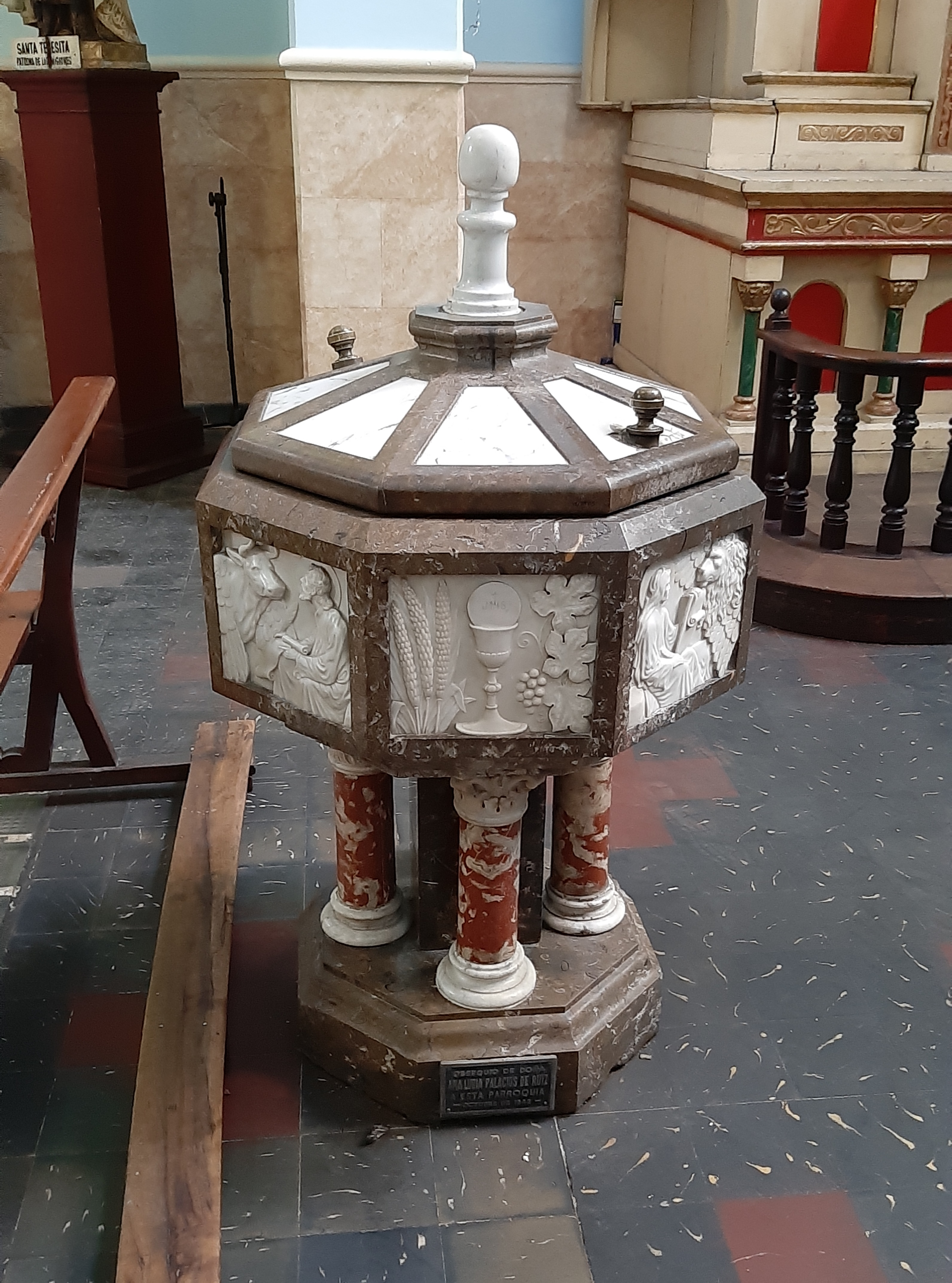
Baptismal font

When Archbishop Ismael Perdomo elevated the Voto church to a parish of the Sacred Heart of Jesus by Decree No. 16 of 12 March 1942, the temple automatically saw the need to acquire a baptismal font to administer the sacrament of baptism. Therefore, in October of that same year (1942), Mrs. Ana Lucía Palacios de Ruiz donated the baptismal font to the newly created parish.

Originally, the font was located in an enclosure at the foot of the north entrance of the main façade; this enclosure served as a baptistery. Some time later, the font was moved to the north arm of the transept, near the presbytery, where it is currently located. The font is made entirely of marble of various colors, including the lid. The bowl (concave container into which water is poured) is octagonal, supported by a central pillar and four columns with Corinthian capitals and smooth shafts. (Note: In Catholicism, baptismal fonts are typically used for baptism by affusion; they usually consist of three parts: bowl, stem, and base or pedestal. The bowl into which the water is poured is more or less voluminous, usually round or octagonal in shape; the latter refers to the seven days of creation and the "new creation", or to the circumcision of Jesus, which, according to Jewish custom, took place on the eighth day after his birth.)

=== Pavement ===
The pavement of the temple presbytery is composed of white marble and was installed by Casa Granda in 1952 along with the entire new presbytery. In contrast, the pavement in the rest of the temple is composed of tiles known as artisan hydraulic tiles or hydraulic mosaic.

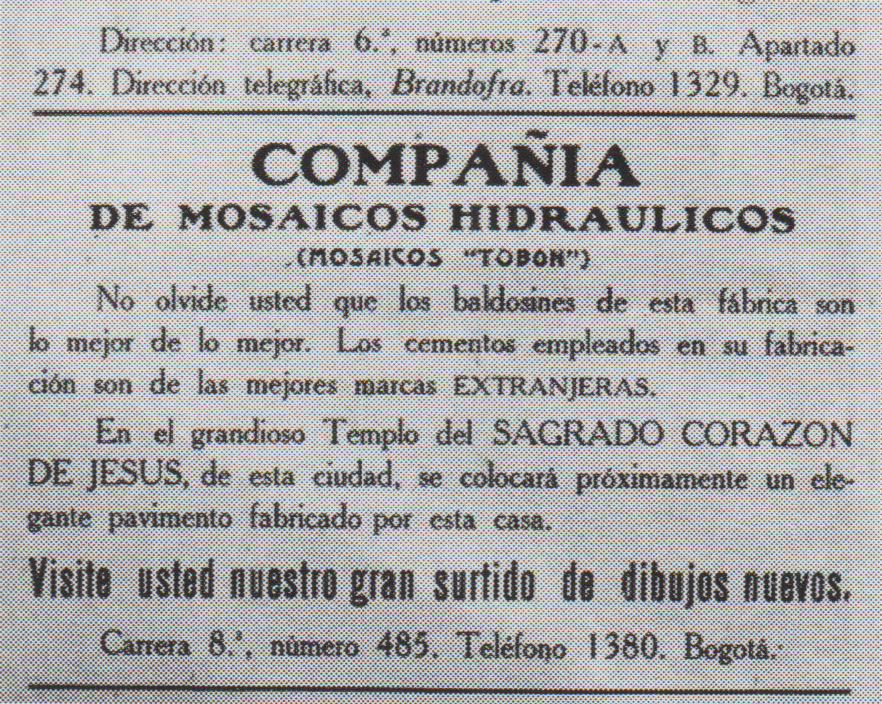
Publicity advertisement for Mosaicos Tobón, published in Revista El Voto Nacional, number 4, April 1910.

From the beginning, the temple had a brick floor as pavement, as highlighted by Fr. Martín Jové in a letter from 1913:

[...] brick floor [...]. When the remains of a corpse were brought, the floor was un-bricked to place it and then re-bricked. Next to the first column on the Calvary side are the remains of the young lady who donated the land, then a pasture, to build the chapel of the Sacred Heart.

—

This pavement continued for several more years; the temple was consecrated in 1916 with this floor, and it was not until 1919 when "a mosaic floor was laid on the temple floor". The new pavement was achieved thanks to various donations obtained through advertisements in the Revista El Voto Nacional, in which the sums donated weekly by each family were published, and in exchange, benefits were offered, such as monthly healing Eucharists, posthumous Eucharists for several years after the donor's death, and even niches in the temple crypt for those who made the highest donations.

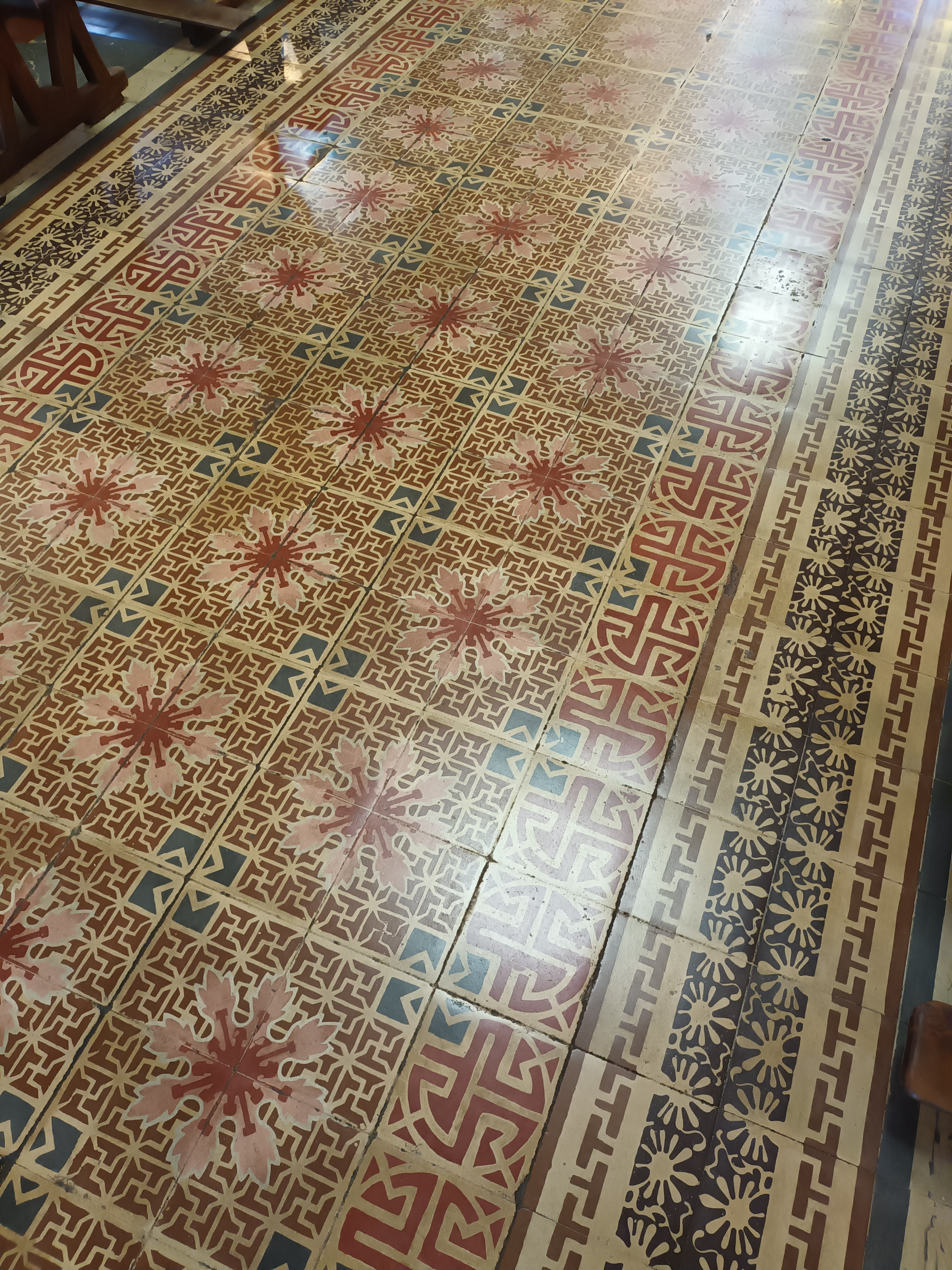
Left. View of the tile with repetitive phytomorphic and geometric figures.

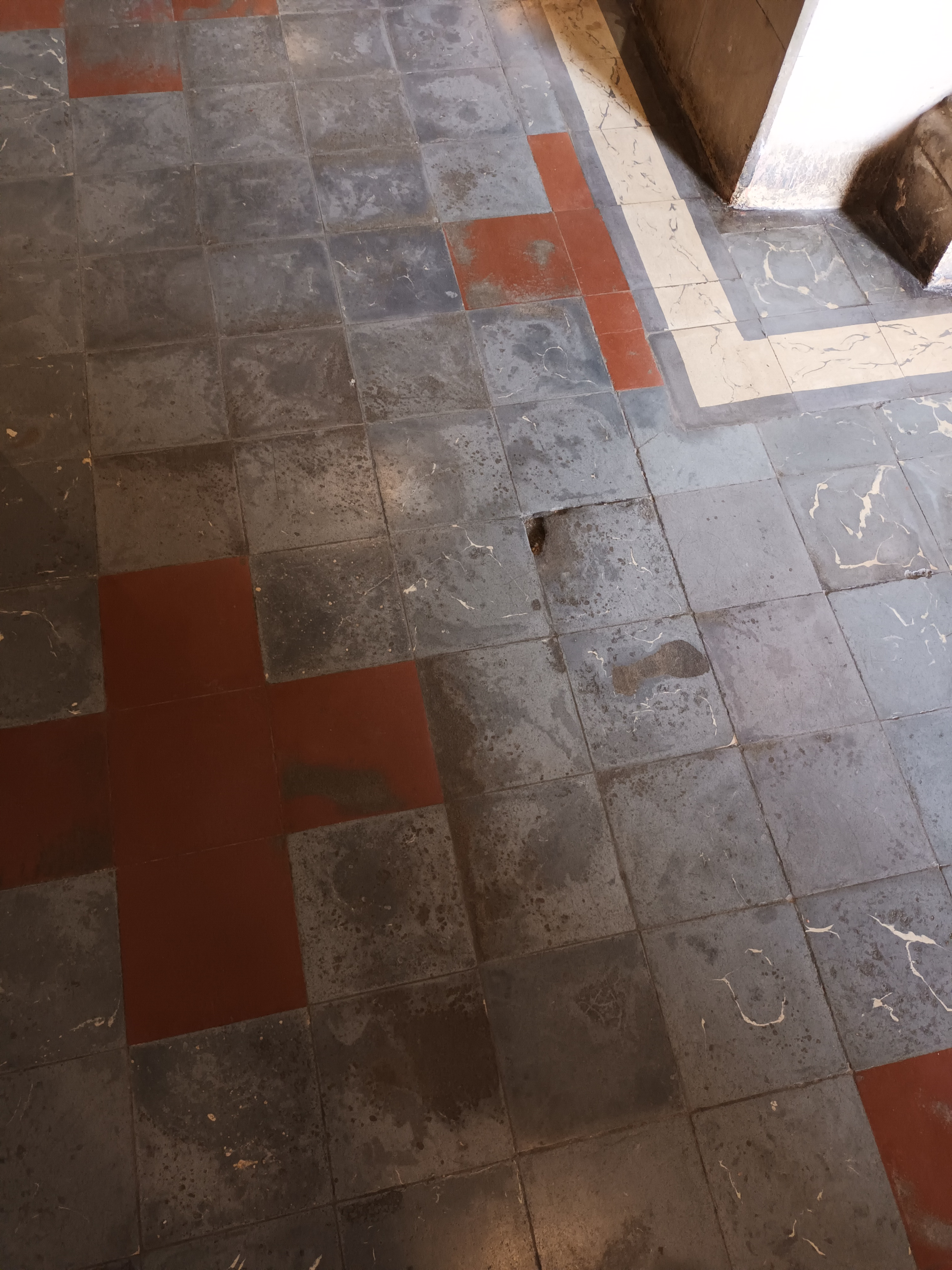
Center. View of the green tile with white veins and some red tiles forming Greek crosses.

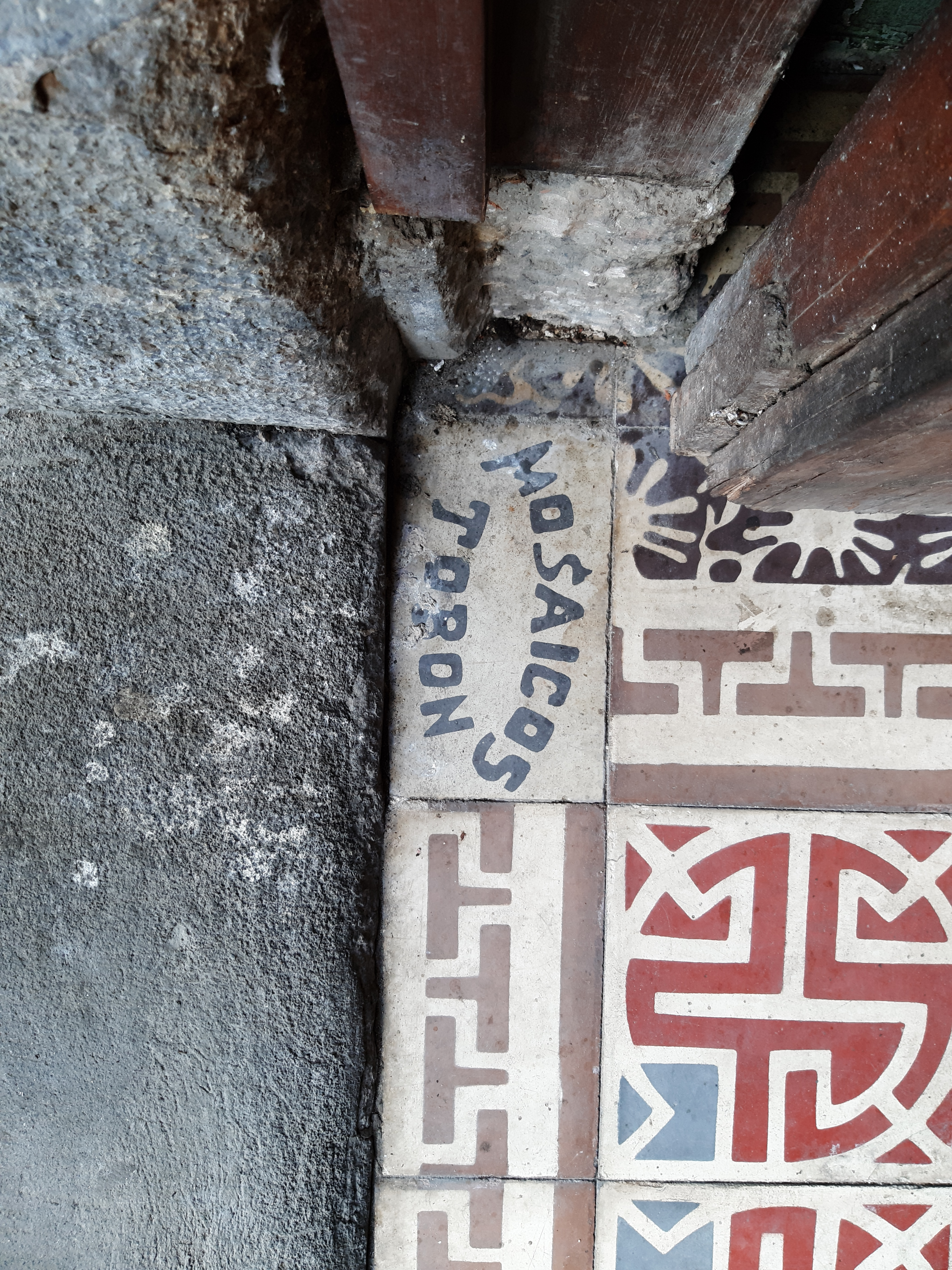
Right. Detail of the manufacturer's mark on the pavement.

According to Claretian memoirs, the "Voto Temple was one of the first buildings paved with tiles". The mosaic tile, also known as hydraulic mosaic, is a decorative pigmented cement tile that became popular between the 19th and 20th centuries, due to its variety of motifs, designs, and colors, and its low cost compared to other types of tiles, gaining great acceptance. Some businesses imported these tiles from Spain; however, factories like the Compañía de Mosaicos Hidráulicos y Granito Artificial, owned by Jesús María Tobón, which made the pavement for the Voto, provided their products at half the cost of those imported from Spain. Thanks to advertisements placed in national circulation print publications such as El Gráfico or the Revista El Voto Nacional, it became one of the best-known factories.

Most of the pavement in the temple is green tile with white veins, and some red tiles forming Greek crosses scattered among the green ones. In contrast, in the middle of the pavement of the longitudinal nave, there is a strip running from the main entrance to where the presbytery begins, made up of tiles with repetitive phytomorphic and geometric motifs in red, white, green, and brown; these are the most striking and artistic.

In general terms, these tiles have missing parts and a high degree of surface wear, resulting in a dull surface. Additionally, the pavement, in general, is not level, presenting subsidence in several areas due to the composition of the support layers and high soil moisture.

=== Plaques ===
Scattered throughout the interior of the Basilica are several plaques, mostly marble, commemorating various events; only one is located outside.

List of plaques and their location
Image	No.	Description	Plan with plaque locations
Plaques located in the antecoro			
	1	Contains a fragment of Decree No. 820 of 1902 in which the president of the republic, José Manuel Marroquín, makes the vow for the peace of the country. Located to the right of the main door.	
	2	Contains a fragment of the pastoral letter of 6 April 1902 in which the Archbishop of Bogotá, Bernardo Herrera Restrepo, proposes making a national vow for peace. Located to the left of the main door.	
	3	Tribute to Fr. Antonio María Pueyo de Val for his work in raising the Voto Nacional temple. Located on the right pillar supporting the choir.	
	4	Tribute to Fr. Pedro Díaz for his work in raising the Voto Nacional temple. Located on the right pillar supporting the choir.	
	5	Remembrance of the jubilee mission of 1926. Dated 19–21 October. Located on the right pillar supporting the choir, between the two previous ones.	
	6	Tribute to Doña Rosa Calvo Cabrera, who donated a large part of the land for the Voto Nacional temple. Dated 5 June 1964. Located in the south corner of the antecoro.	
	7	Commemorates the elevation to minor basilica of the Voto Nacional temple on 14 February 1964 and its proclamation on 5 June of the same year. Located south of the antecoro.	
Plaques located in the Chapels on the south side (Gospel side).
	8	Commemoration of the Government of Boyacá for the consecration of the department to the Sacred Heart of Jesus. Dated 3 December 2004. Located in the Tunja Chapel, on the left side when facing forward.	
	9	Commemorates, in honor of the crucified Jesus, the consecration of the altar held on 24 September 1916 by Msgr. Eduardo Maldonado Calvo, bishop of Tunja. Located in the Tunja Chapel, on the right side when facing forward.	
	10	Commemorates the blessing of the image of the Virgin Mary under the title of the Miraculous Medal, held on Saturday, 17 September 1960, by Msgr. Guillermo Escobar Vélez, bishop of Santa Fe de Antioquia. Located in the Antioquia Chapel, on the right side when facing forward.	
	11	Commemoration of the Government of Norte de Santander for the consecration of the department to the Sacred Heart of Jesus. Dated 25 October 2006. Located in the Pamplona Chapel, on the right side when facing forward.	
	12	Commemorates, in honor of Jesus presented in the temple, the consecration of the altar held on 24 September 1916 by Msgr. Manuel José Cayzedo, archbishop of Medellín. Located in the Medellín Chapel, on the right side when facing forward.	
Plaques located in the Chapels on the north side (Epistle side).
	13	Commemorates, in honor of the Risen Jesus, the consecration of the altar held on 24 September 1916 by Msgr. Antonio Vicente Arenas Rueda, bishop of Socorro. Located in the Socorro Chapel, on the left side when facing forward.	
	14	Thanks from Vicenta M. de Harker to Saint Francis of Paola. Located in the Manizales Chapel, on the right side when facing forward.	
	15	Thanks from the Department of Huila to the Sacred Heart of Jesus. Dated 2 December 2005. Located in the Garzón Chapel, on the left side when facing forward.	
	16	Thanks from the Department of Tolima to the Sacred Heart of Jesus. Dated 2006. Located in the Ibagué Chapel, on the left side when facing forward.	
	17	Tribute from the National Police of Colombia to the Virgin of Carmen, canonically declared their patroness. Dated 1919. Located in the National Police Chapel, on the left side when facing forward.	
	18	Thanks from the National Police of Colombia to the Sacred Heart of Jesus and the Virgin of Carmen, on the 113th anniversary of their foundation. Dated 5 November 2004. Located in the National Police Chapel, on the right side when facing forward.	
Plaques located in the transept of the temple.
	19	Commemoration of the consecration of the National Army of Colombia to the Sacred Heart of Jesus. Dated 30 May 2008. Located under the arch between the Cartagena chapel and the south arm transept.	
	20	Thanks from the Department of Cundinamarca to the Sacred Heart of Jesus. Dated 2005. Located to the left of the Immaculate Heart of Mary altar.	
	21	This metal plaque is located at the base of the baptismal font, which is itself located in the north arm of the transept. The plaque indicates that the baptismal font was donated by Mrs. Ana Lucía Palacios de Ruiz in October 1942.	
Plaque located outside the temple.
	22	Commemoration of the Basilica of the Sacred Heart of Jesus dedicated by a Vow made in 1902. Dated 23 June 1995. Located, facing the façade, to the right of the north door.	
No. = Location number. The order of the list is random.

== Dependencies ==
=== Ossuary crypt ===
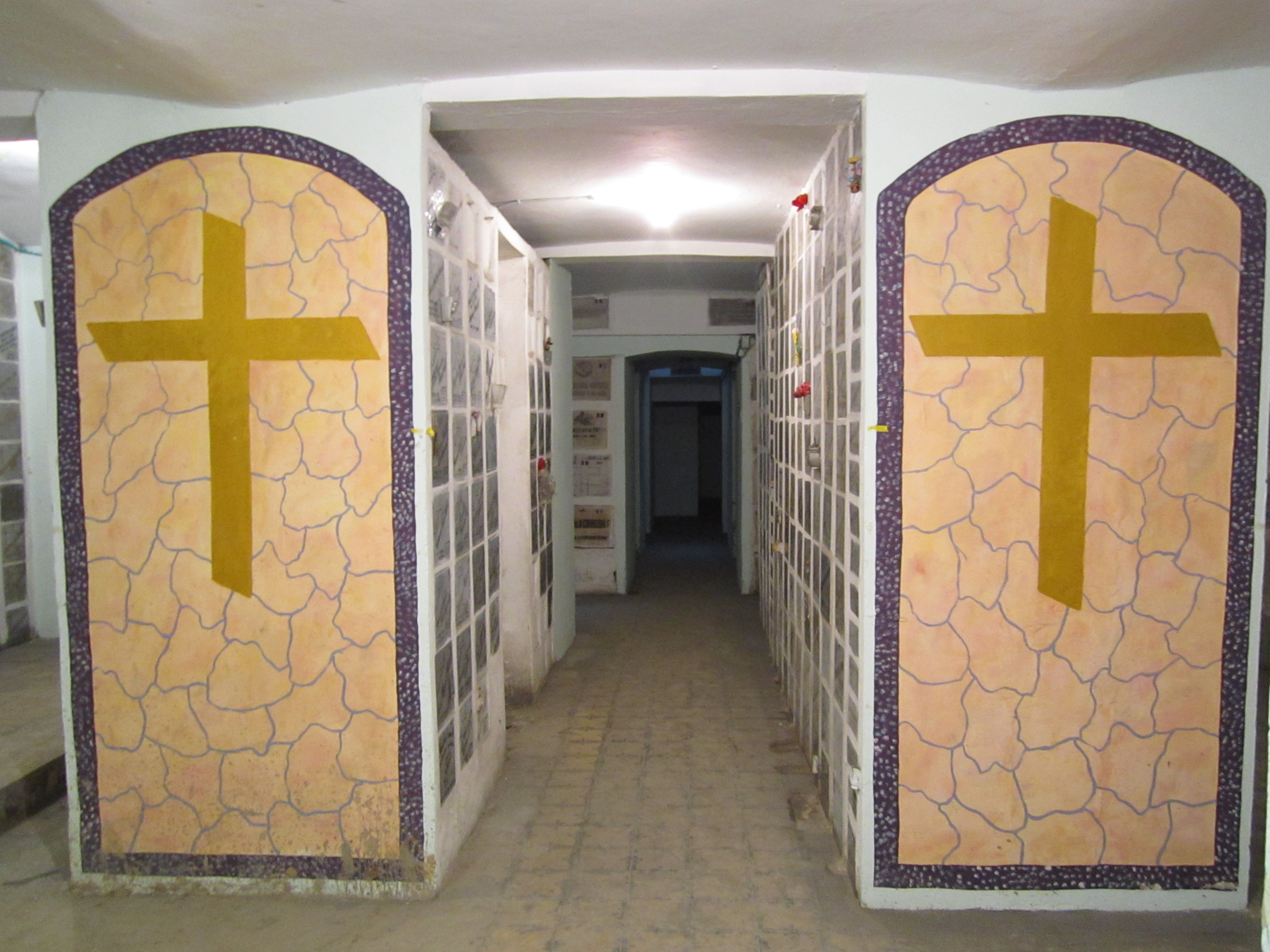
Ossuary crypt.

The Ossuary Crypt is located in a basement directly below the transept and the sacristy, and in a semi-basement located in the south courtyard, between the temple and the Claretian building; it has a total area of 623.23 m^{2}, of which 434.11 correspond to the basement and 177.35 m^{2} to the semi-basement; it consists of several galleries containing the ossuaries; access to the enclosure is via a staircase located in the south arm of the transept.

Due to the close link with the Claretian fathers and the temple, the mortal remains of Maestro Ricardo Acevedo Bernal and his wife lie in the ossuary crypt; they were brought on 10 January 1963 from Rome, Italy, where the artist had moved and where he later died. In the ossuary crypt are also the remains of Doña Rosa Calvo Cabrera, donor of a large part of the land for the temple, and of the Italian sculptor Pedro Julio D'Achiardi, ornamenter of the church façade.

=== Sacristy ===
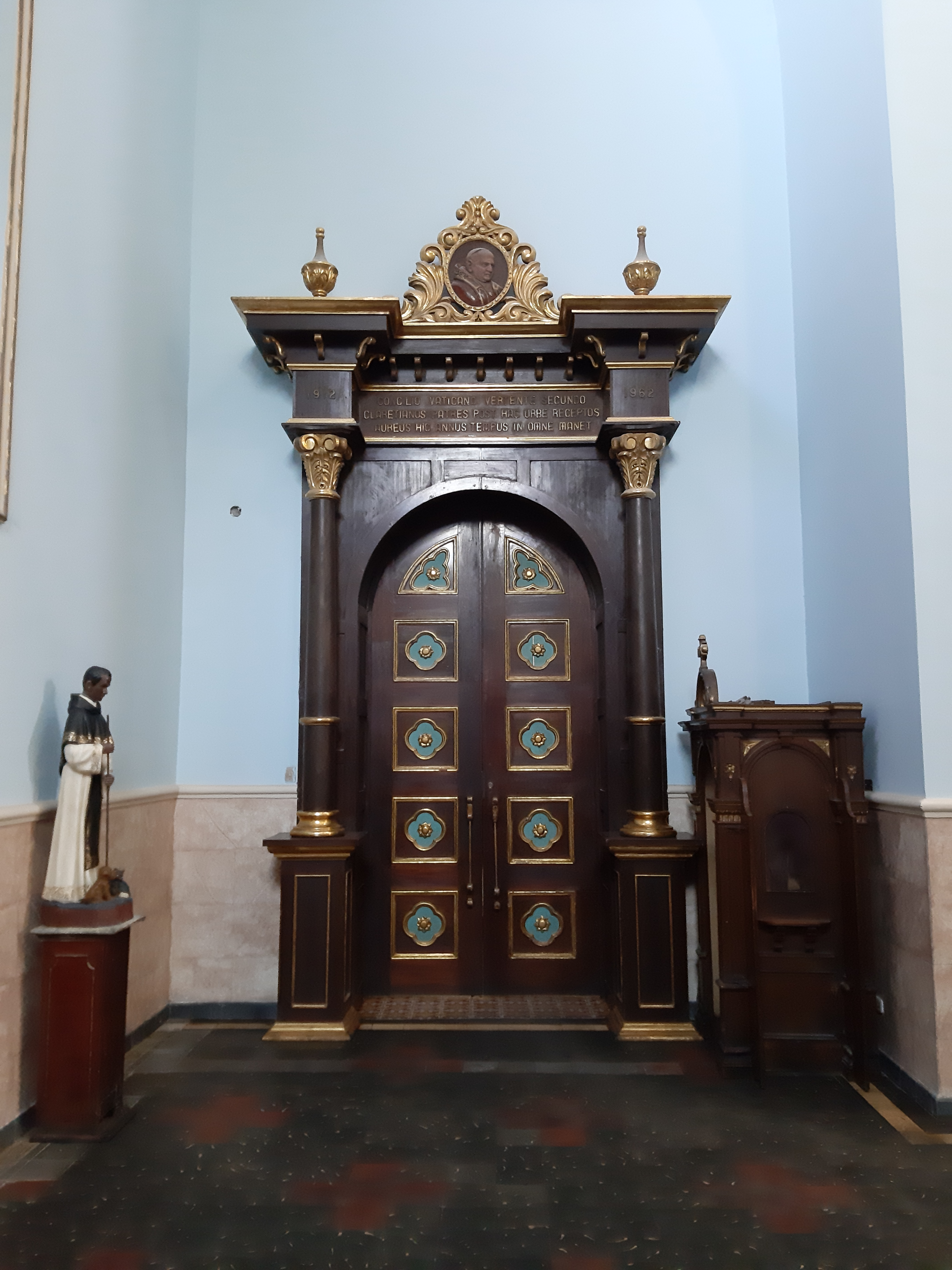
Main entrance door to the sacristy.

The sacristy of the basilica is divided into two areas, located in the block southwest of the temple, which was part of the former Claretian headquarters. This block has several floors, mostly used by the Claretian community and not part of parish use. The main sacristy has direct access to the temple through a large door connecting to the south arm of the transept and through a smaller door connecting to a hallway, which leads to the back of the presbytery.

The main sacristy, with an area of approx. 74.09 m^{2}, stores objects necessary for religious celebrations, such as unconsecrated hosts, chalices, chasubles, stoles, etc., and is restricted to the general public. In the center of this room is the "sacristy table", 5 m long x 2 m wide, with several compartments for storing liturgical items.

The secondary sacristy or deposit, with an area of approx. 119.87 m^{2}, is located just after the main sacristy, but on a higher level, as a kind of mezzanine; this area mainly stores items not used daily, used for specific events of the year, such as Holy Week, December, the patronal feast, etc.

== Bibliography ==
- Reina Mendoza, Sandra; Del Castillo, Lina Esmeralda (2016). Paz y el Sagrado Corazón: Iglesia del Voto Nacional [Peace and the Sacred Heart: Church of the National Vow] (in Spanish). Bogotá: Instituto Distrital de Patrimonio Cultural. ISBN 9789585823136.
- Claretianos (1962). Bodas de oro de la Comunidad Claretiana de Bogotá: 1912–1962 [The Golden Jubilee of the Claretian Community of Bogotá: 1912–1962] (in Spanish). Bogotá: Editorial el Voto Nacional. OCLC 981333864.
- Mesa Gómez, Carlos Eduardo (1984). El padre Pueyo Obispo de Pasto, 1917–1929 [Father Pueyo, Bishop of Pasto, 1917–1929] (in Spanish). Medellín: Editorial Zuluaga. OCLC 253942513.
- Mesa Gómez, Carlos Eduardo (1990). Los Claretianos del Voto Nacional (1912–1989) [The Claretians of the National Vow (1912–1989)] (in Spanish). Medellín: Editorial Zuluaga. OCLC 22649565.
- Montoya, Arturo (1952). Jesucristo y Colombia. Con ocasión de los 50 años de paz (21 de noviembre, 1902) y de la consagración oficial de la República al Sagrado Corazón de Jesús (22 de junio, 1902) [Jesus Christ and Colombia. On the occasion of the 50th anniversary of peace (November 21, 1902) and the official consecration of the Republic to the Sacred Heart of Jesus (June 22, 1902)] (in Spanish). Bogotá: Imprenta Nacional. OCLC 26990427.

== See also ==
- Roman Catholic Archdiocese of Bogotá
- List of Catholic basilicas
- List of National Monuments of Colombia
