= List of Catholic dioceses in Colombia =

Map showing the thirteen ecclesiastical provinces in Colombia.

The diocesan system of Roman Catholic church government in Colombia comprises thirteen ecclesiastical provinces each headed by an archbishop. The provinces are in turn subdivided into 52 dioceses and 13 archdioceses each headed by a bishop or an archbishop.

== List of Dioceses ==
=== Ecclesiastical province of Barranquilla ===
- Archdiocese of Barranquilla
  - Diocese of El Banco
  - Diocese of Riohacha
  - Diocese of Santa Marta
  - Diocese of Valledupar

=== Ecclesiastical province of Bogotá ===
- Archdiocese of Bogotá
  - Diocese of Engativá
  - Diocese of Facatativá
  - Diocese of Fontibón
  - Diocese of Girardot
  - Diocese of Soacha
  - Diocese of Zipaquirá

=== Ecclesiastical province of Bucaramanga ===
- Archdiocese of Bucaramanga
  - Diocese of Barrancabermeja
  - Diocese of Málaga-Soatá
  - Diocese of Socorro y San Gil
  - Diocese of Vélez

=== Ecclesiastical province of Cali ===
- Archdiocese of Cali
  - Diocese of Buenaventura
  - Diocese of Buga
  - Diocese of Cartago
  - Diocese of Palmira

=== Ecclesiastical province of Cartagena ===
- Archdiocese of Cartagena
  - Diocese of Magangué
  - Diocese of Montelibano
  - Diocese of Monteria
  - Diocese of Sincelejo

=== Ecclesiastical province of Florencia ===
- Archdiocese of Florencia
  - Diocese of Mocoa–Sibundoy
  - Diocese of San Vicente del Caguán

=== Ecclesiastical province of Ibagué ===
- Archdiocese of Ibagué
  - Diocese of Espinal
  - Diocese of Garzón
  - Diocese of Líbano–Honda
  - Diocese of Neiva

=== Ecclesiastical province of Manizales ===
- Archdiocese of Manizales
  - Diocese of Armenia
  - Diocese of La Dorada-Guaduas
  - Diocese of Pereira

=== Ecclesiastical province of Medellín ===
- Archdiocese of Medellín
  - Diocese of Caldas
  - Diocese of Girardota
  - Diocese of Jericó
  - Diocese of Sonsón-Rionegro

=== Ecclesiastical province of Nueva Pamplona ===
- Archdiocese of Nueva Pamplona
  - Diocese of Arauca
  - Diocese of Cúcuta
  - Diocese of Ocaña
  - Diocese of Tibú

=== Ecclesiastical province of Popayán ===
- Archdiocese of Popayán
  - Diocese of Ipiales
  - Diocese of Pasto
  - Diocese of Tumaco

=== Ecclesiastical province of Santa Fe de Antioquia ===
- Archdiocese of Santa Fe de Antioquia
  - Diocese of Apartadó
  - Diocese of Ismina-Tadó
  - Diocese of Quibdó
  - Diocese of Santa Rosa de Osos

=== Ecclesiastical province of Tunja ===
- Archdiocese of Tunja
  - Diocese of Chiquinquirá
  - Diocese of Duitama-Sogamoso
  - Diocese of Garagoa
  - Diocese of Yopal

=== Ecclesiastical province of Villavicencio ===
- Archdiocese of Villavicencio
  - Diocese of Granada en Colombia
  - Diocese of San José del Guaviare

== Apostolic Vicariates ==
- Apostolic Vicariate of Guapi
- Apostolic Vicariate of Inírida
- Apostolic Vicariate of Leticia
- Apostolic Vicariate of Mitú
- Apostolic Vicariate of Puerto Carreño
- Apostolic Vicariate of Puerto Gaitán
- Apostolic Vicariate of Puerto Leguízamo-Solano
- Apostolic Vicariate of San Andrés y Providencia
- Apostolic Vicariate of Tierradentro
- Apostolic Vicariate of Trinidad
- Military Ordinariate of Colombia

== Defunct Circumscriptions ==
- Roman Catholic Diocese of Jericó (first creation)
- Roman Catholic Diocese of Tolima
- Apostolic Vicariate of Caquetá
- Apostolic Vicariate of Casanare
- Apostolic Vicariate of Goajira
- Apostolic Vicariate of San Vicente del Caguán (now diocese)
- Apostolic Prefecture of Chocó
- Apostolic Prefecture of Labateca
- Apostolic Prefecture of Vichada
- Intendencia Oriental y Llanos de San Martín

== Gallery of Archdioceses ==
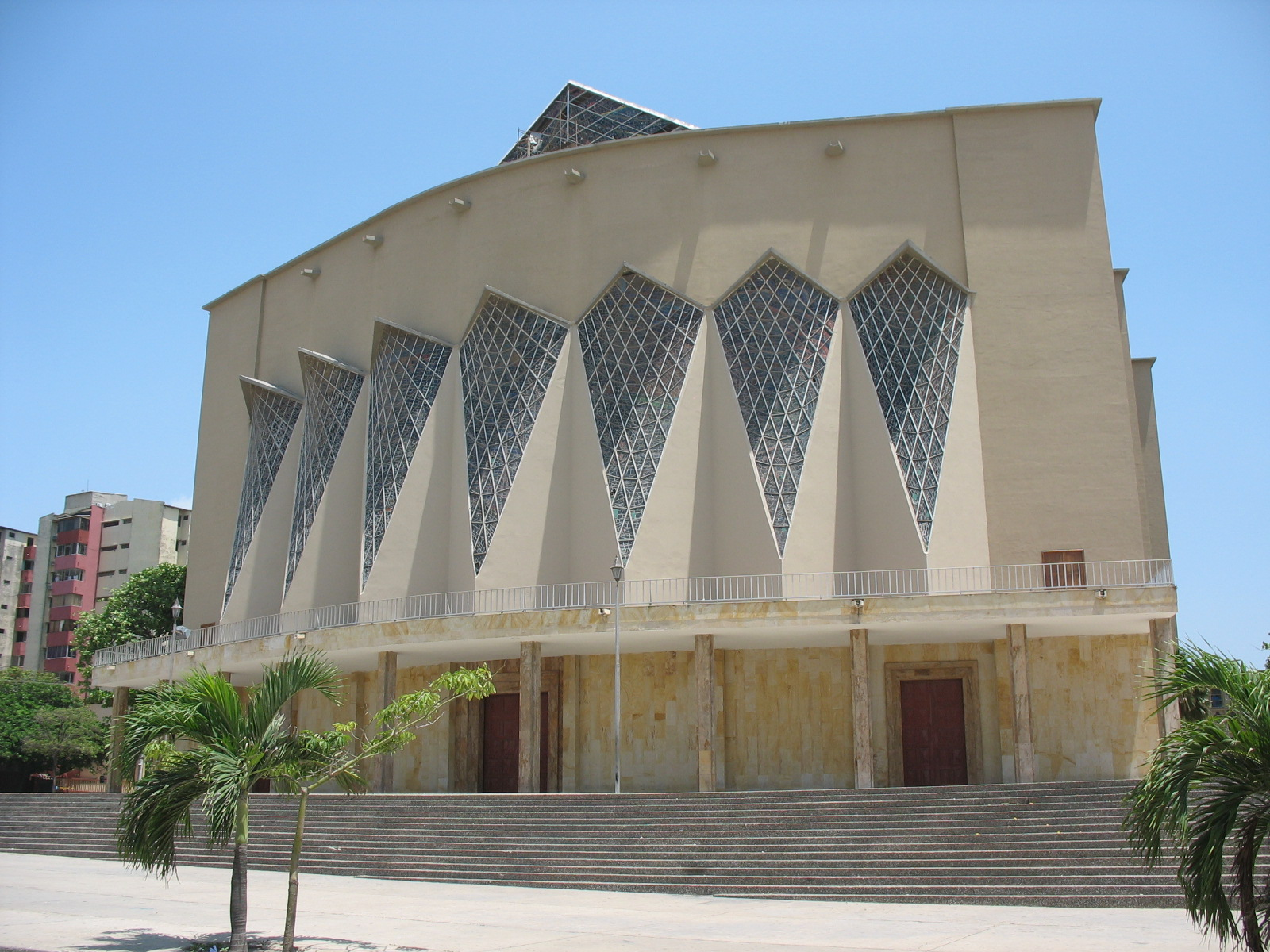
The seat of the Archdiocese of Barranquilla is Catedral Metropolitana de María Reina.

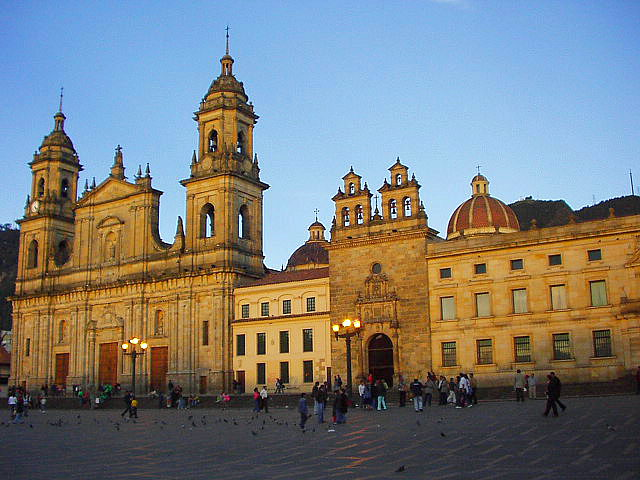
The seat of the Archdiocese of Bogotá is Catedral Primada Basílica de la Inmaculada Concepción.

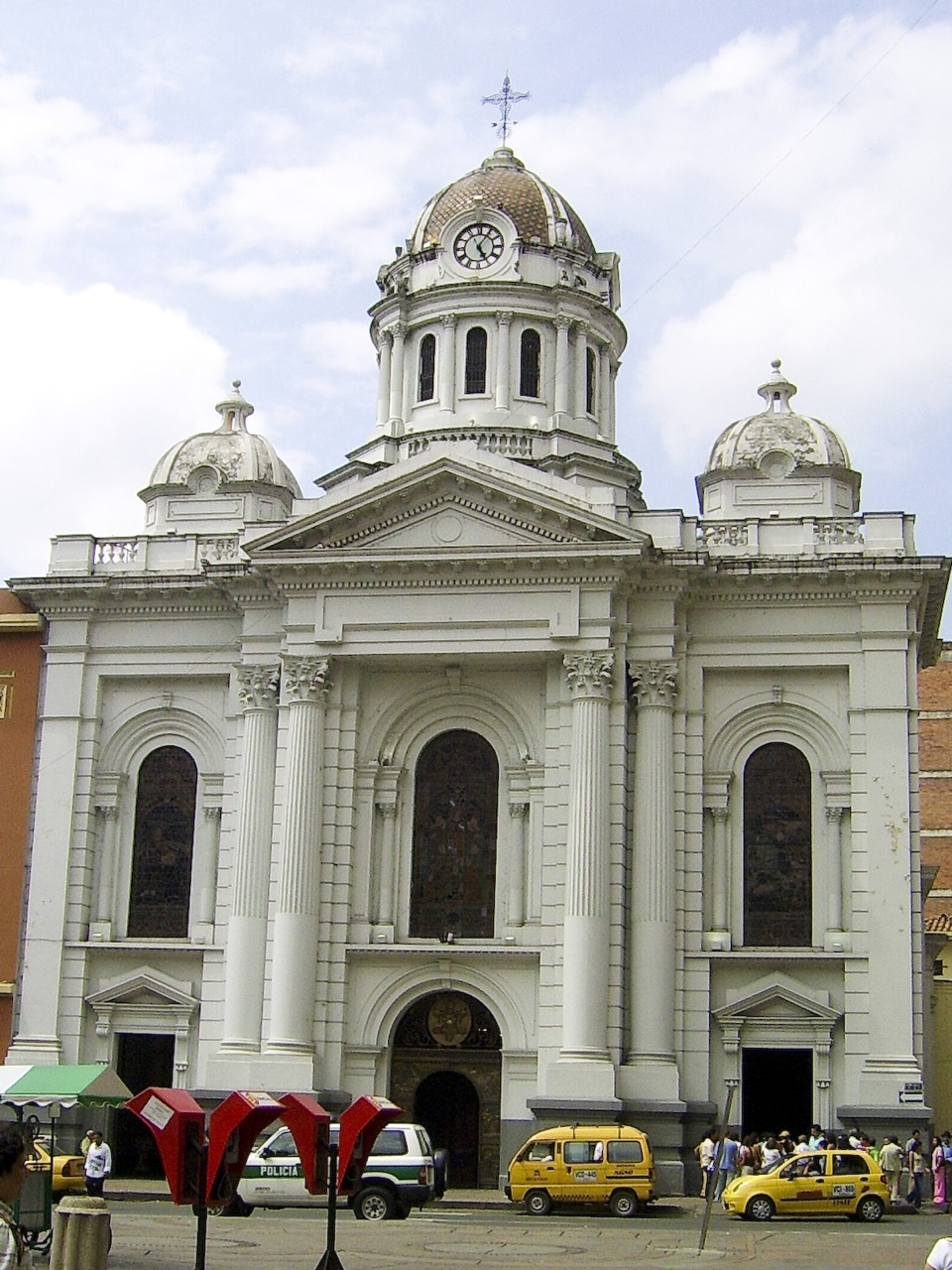
The seat of the Archdiocese of Cali is Catedral de San Pedro.

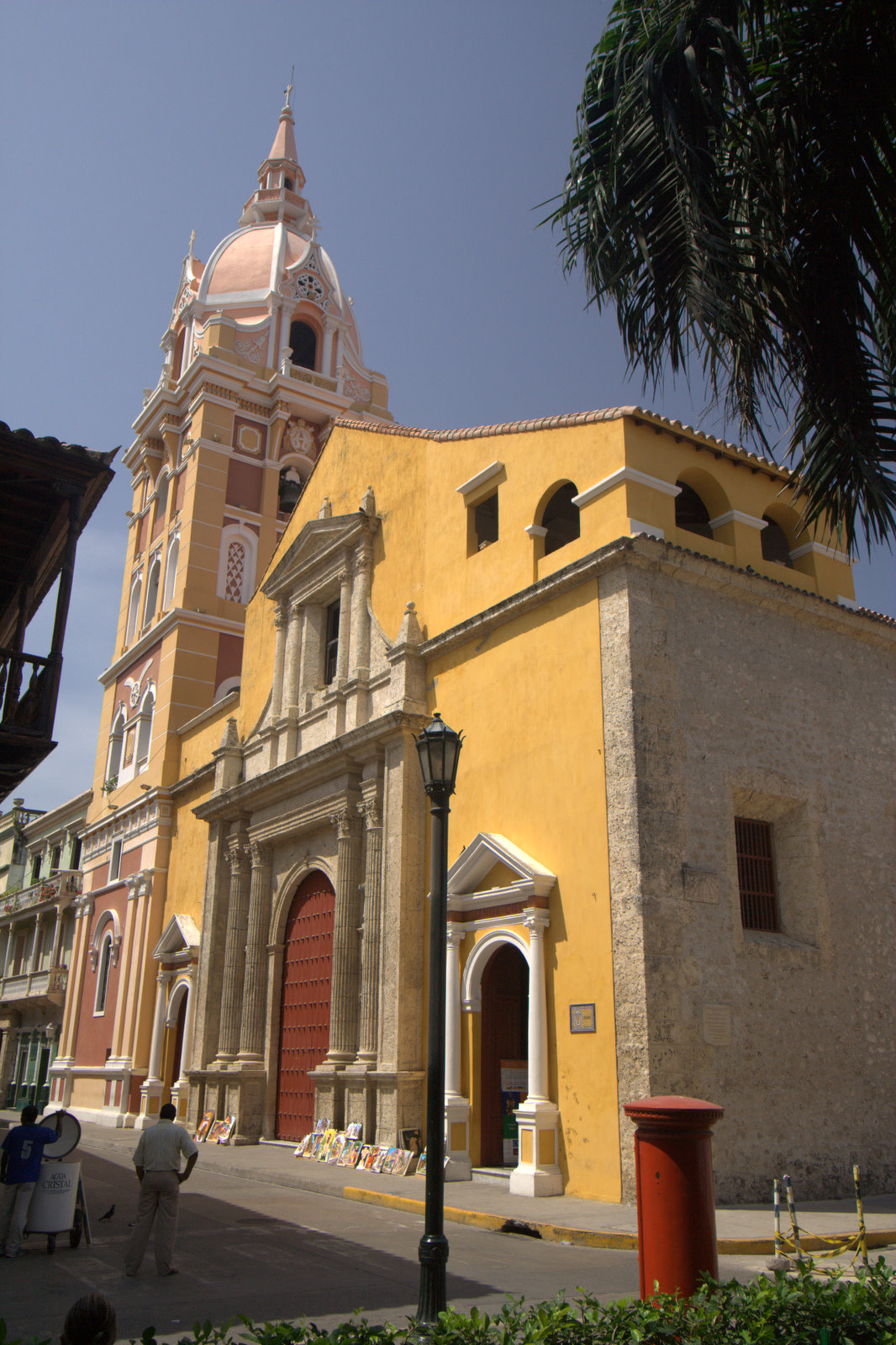
The seat of the Archdiocese of Cartagena is Catedral Basílica Metropolitana de Santa Catalina de Alejandría.

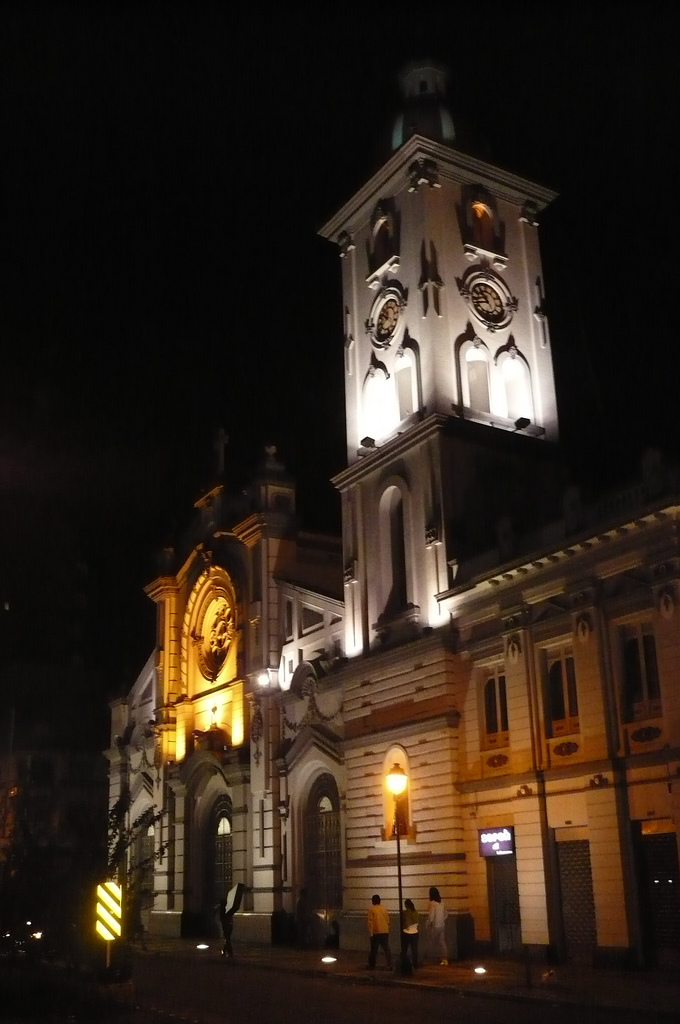
The seat of the Archdiocese of Ibagué is Catedral de la Inmaculada Concepción.

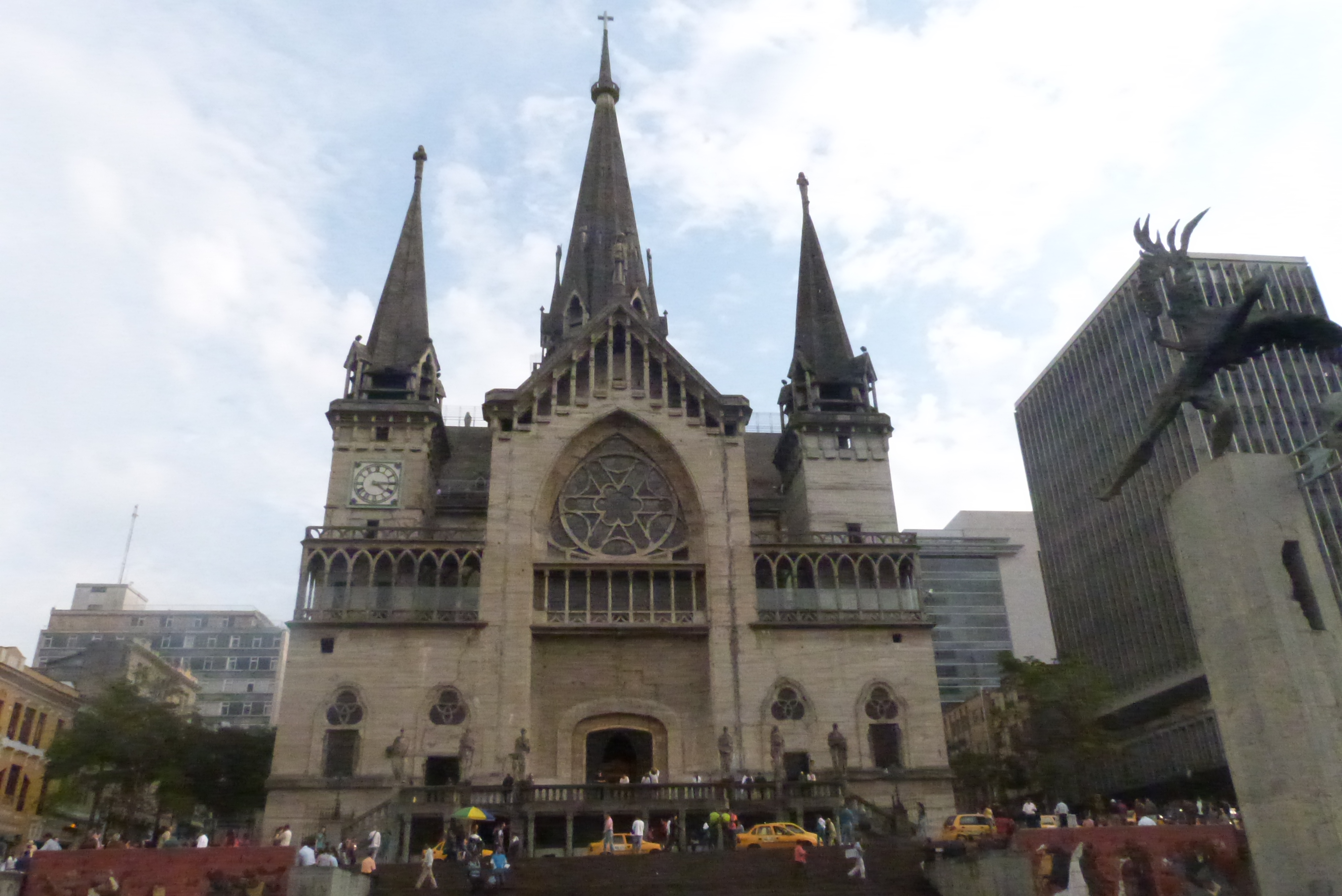
The seat of the Archdiocese of Manizales is Catedral Basilica de Nuestra Señora del Rosario.

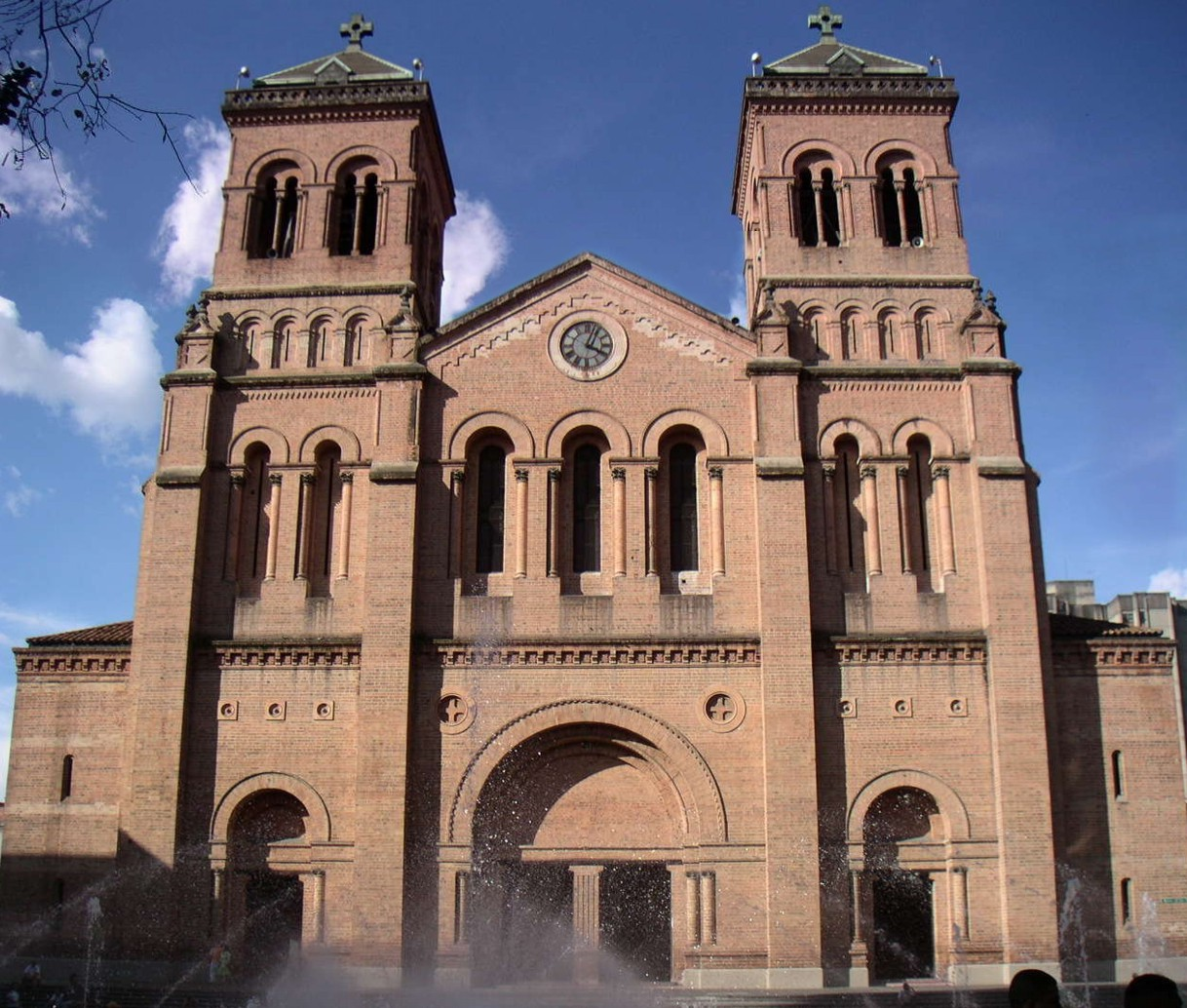
The seat of the Archdiocese of Medellín is Catedral Basílica Metropolitana de la Inmaculada Concepción.

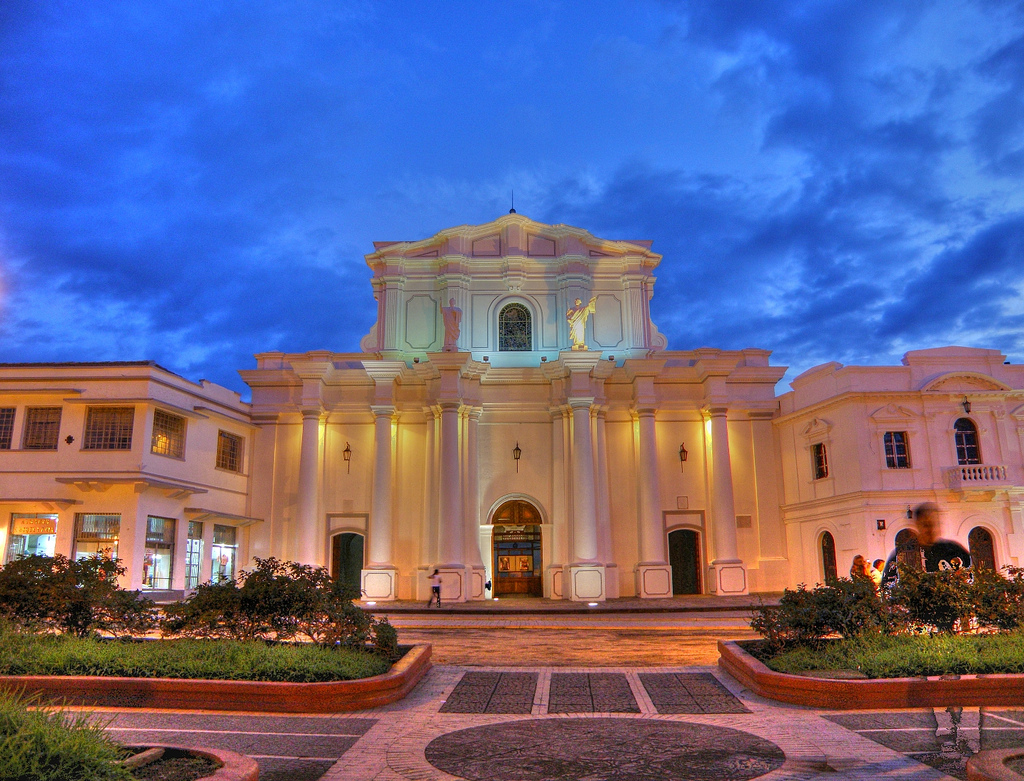
The seat of the Archdiocese of Popayán is Catedral Basílica de Nuestra Señora de la Asunción.

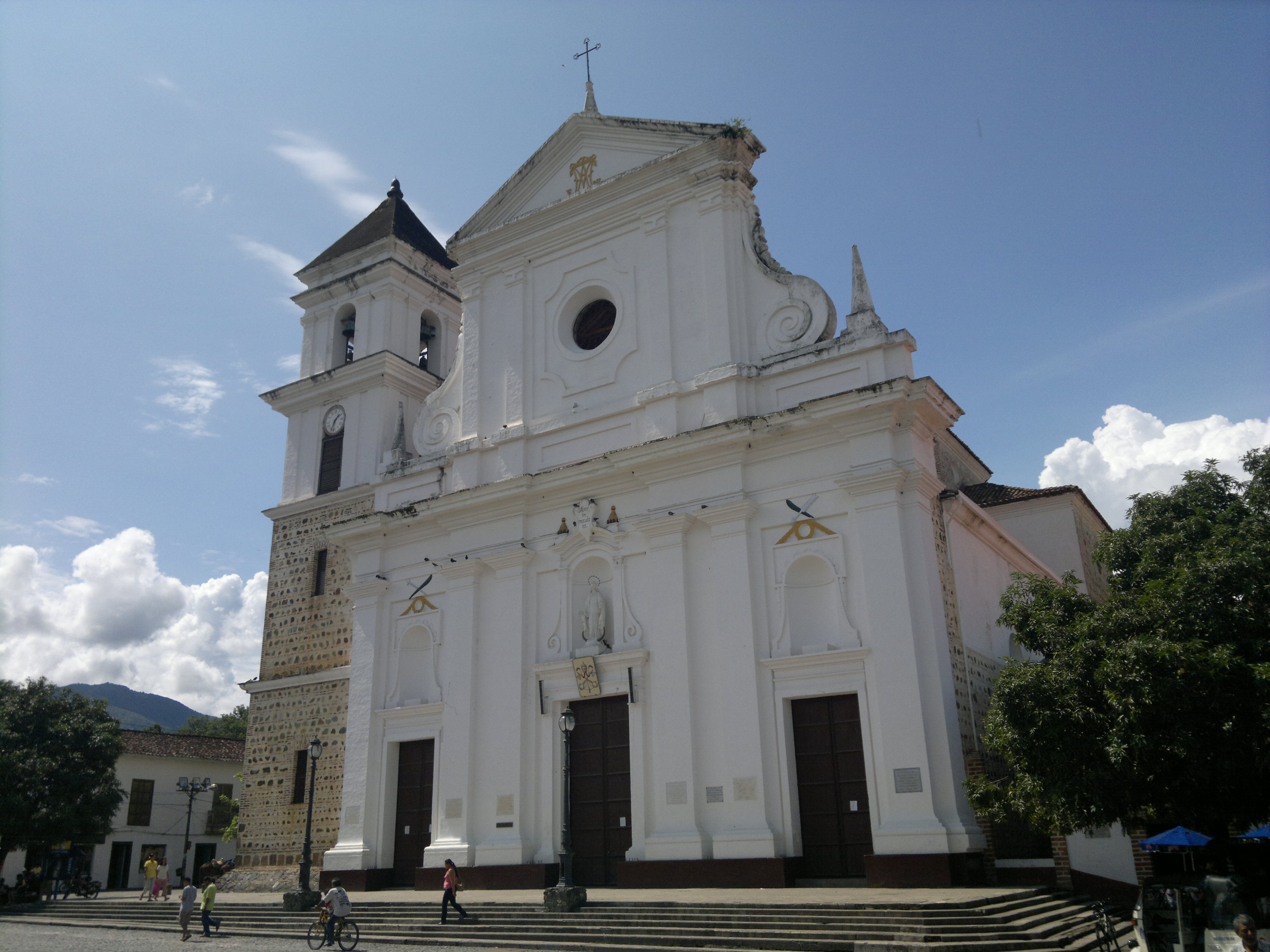
The seat of the Archdiocese of Santa Fe de Antioquia is Catedral Basílica Metropolitana Nuestra Señora de la Inmaculada Concepción.

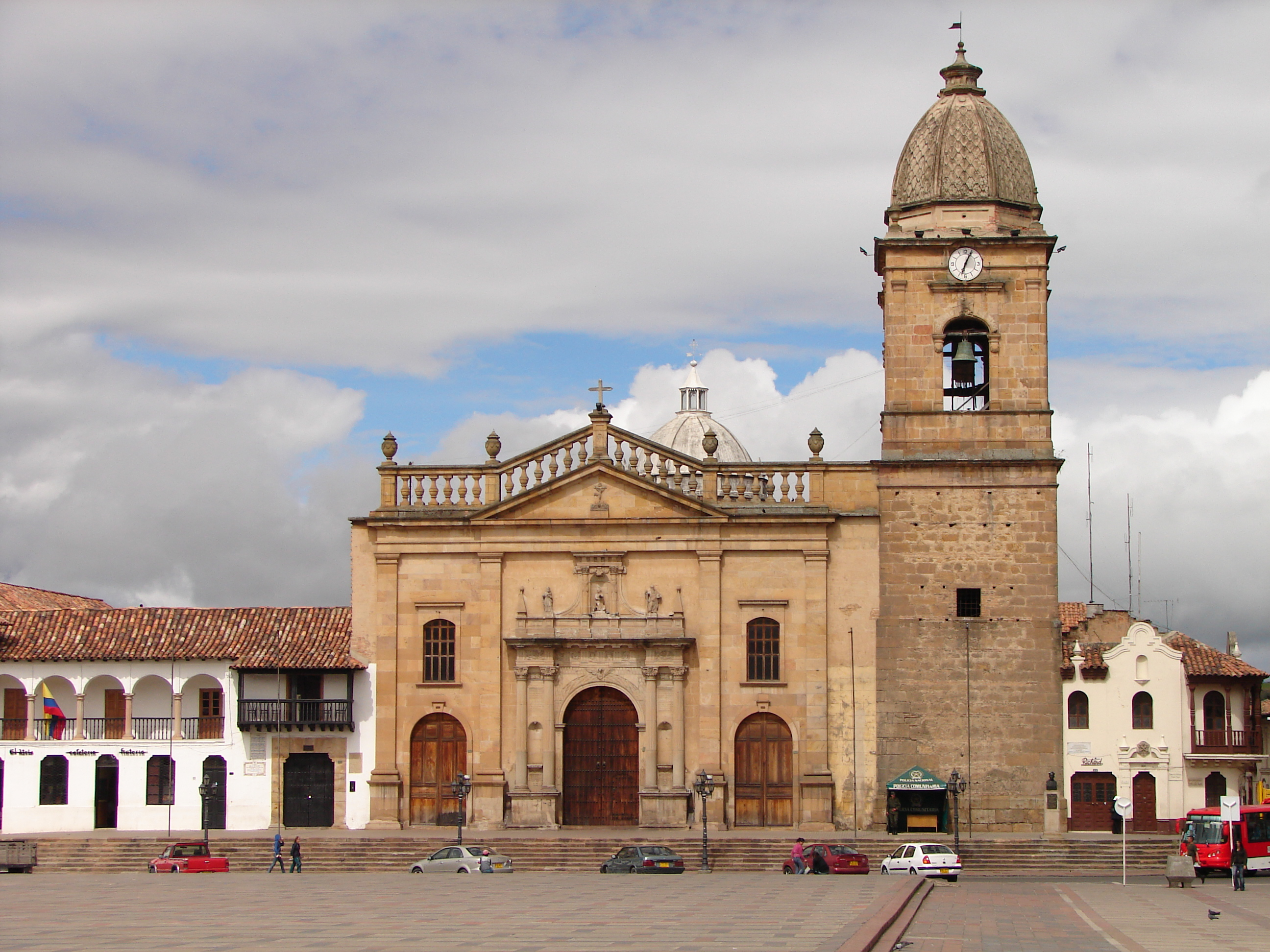
The seat of the Archdiocese of Tunja is Catedral Basílica de Santiago Apóstol.

== See also ==
- Roman Catholicism in Colombia
