= Episcopal Conference of Colombia =

Administrative institution of the Catholic Church

- Conferencia Episcopal de Colombia
- Abbreviation: CEC
- Formation: 14 September 1908
- Type: Episcopal conference
- Legal status: Civil nonprofit
- Region served: Colombia
- Members: Active and retired Catholic bishops of the Colombia
- Official language: Spanish
- President: Luis José Rueda Aparicio
- Main organ: Conference

The Episcopal Conference of Colombia is an administrative institution and permanence of the Catholic Church, composed of all the bishops of the dioceses of Colombia in a college, in communion with the Roman Pontiff and under his authority to exercise set of certain pastoral functions of the episcopate on the faithful of their territory under the rule of law and statutes, in order to promote the life of the Church, to strengthen its mission of evangelization and respond more effectively to the greater good that the Church should seek to men.

== Ecclesiastical organization ==
The Catholic Church is organised into 13 archdioceses, 52 suffragan dioceses, 10 apostolic vicariates and one military ordinariate. The archdiocese and dioceses are:

- Roman Catholic Archdiocese of Barranquilla – Suffragan dioceses: El Banco, Riohacha, Santa Marta and Valledupar;
- Roman Catholic Archdiocese of Bogotá – Suffragan dioceses: Engativá, Facatativá, Fontibón, Girardot, Soacha and Zipaquirá;
- Roman Catholic Archdiocese of Bucaramanga – Suffragan dioceses: Barrancabermeja, Málaga-Soatá, Socorro and San Gil and Vélez;
- Roman Catholic Archdiocese of Cali – Suffragan Dioceses: Buenaventura, Buga, Cartago and Palmira;
- Roman Catholic Archdiocese of Cartagena – Suffragan Dioceses: Magangué, Montelíbano, Montería and Sincelejo;
- Archdiocese of Florencia – Suffragan dioceses: Mocoa-Sibundoy and San Vicente del Caguán;
- Roman Catholic Archdiocese of Ibagué – Suffragan Dioceses: Espinal, Garzón, Líbano-Honda and Neiva;
- Roman Catholic Archdiocese of Manizales – Suffragan dioceses: Armenia, La Dorada-Guaduas and Pereira;
- Roman Catholic Archdiocese of Medellín – Suffragan Dioceses: Caldas, Girardota, Jericó and Sonsón-Rionegro;
- Roman Catholic Archdiocese of Nueva Pamplona – Suffragan Dioceses: Arauca, Cúcuta, Ocaña and Tibú;
- Roman Catholic Archdiocese of Popayán – Suffragan Dioceses: Ipiales, Pasto and Tumaco;
- Roman Catholic Archdiocese of Santa Fe de Antioquia – Suffragan dioceses: Apartadó, Tadó-Istmina, Quibdó and Santa Rosa de Osos;
- Roman Catholic Archdiocese of Tunja – Suffragan Dioceses: Chiquinquirá, Duitama-Sogamoso, Garagoa and Yopal;
- Roman Catholic Archdiocese of Villavicencio – Suffragan dioceses: Granada in Colombia and San José del Guaviare.

The apostolic vicariates are Guapi, Inírida, Leticia, Mitú, Puerto Carreño, Puerto Gaitán, Puerto Leguízamo-Solano, San Andrés y Providencia, Tierradentro and Trinidad. By their nature, they are direct subject to the Holy See.

Finally, there is the Military Ordinariate of Colombia.

== Presidents ==
No.	President	See	Term
1	Bernardo Herrera Restrepo	Bogotá	1908–1928
2	Ismael Perdomo Borrero	Bogotá	1928–1950
3	Crisanto Luque Sánchez	Bogotá	1950–1959
4	Luis Concha Córdoba	Bogotá	1959–1964
5	Aníbal Muñoz Duque	Nueva Pamplona Bogotá	1964–1972
6	José de Jesús Pimiento Rodríguez	Garzón Manizales	1972–1978
7	Mario Revollo Bravo	Nueva Pamplona	1978–1984
8	Héctor Rueda Hernández	Bucaramanga	1984–1987
9	Alfonso López Trujillo	Medellín	1987–1990
10	Pedro Rubiano Sáenz	Cali Bogotá	1990–1996
11	Alberto Giraldo Jaramillo	Popayán Medellín	1996–2002
12	Pedro Rubiano Sáenz	Bogotá	2002–2005
13	Luis Augusto Castro Quiroga	Tunja	2005–2008
14	Rubén Salazar Gómez	Barranquilla; Bogotá	2008–2014
15	Luis Augusto Castro Quiroga	Tunja	2014–2017
16	Oscar Urbina Ortega	Villavicencio	2017–2021
17	Luis José Rueda Aparicio	Bogotá	2021–2024
18	Francisco Javier Múnera Correa	Cartagena	2024–present

== See also ==
- Catholic Church in Colombia
