= Archdiocese of Bogotá =

Latin Catholic territory in Colombia

Coordinates: 4.5978°N 74.0750°W

Archdiocese of Bogotá Archidioecesis Metropolitae Bogotensis

Catholic

Location
- Country: Colombia
- Ecclesiastical province: Bogotá

Statistics
- Area: 4,019 km^{2} (1,552 sq mi)
- Population: Total; Catholics: (as of 2006); 4,184,000; 3,586,000 (85.7%)

Information
- Denomination: Catholic Church
- Sui iuris church: Latin Church
- Rite: Roman Rite
- Established: 11 September 1562 (464 years ago)
- Cathedral: Cathedral-Basilica of the Immaculate Conception
- Patron saint: St. Elizabeth of Hungary

Current leadership
- Pope: Leo XIV
- Metropolitan Archbishop: Luis José Rueda Aparicio
- Auxiliary Bishops: Luis Manuel Alí Herrera; Germán Medina Acosta; Alejandro Díaz García; Andrés Amaury Rosario Henriquez
- Bishops emeritus: Rubén Salazar Gómez

Map
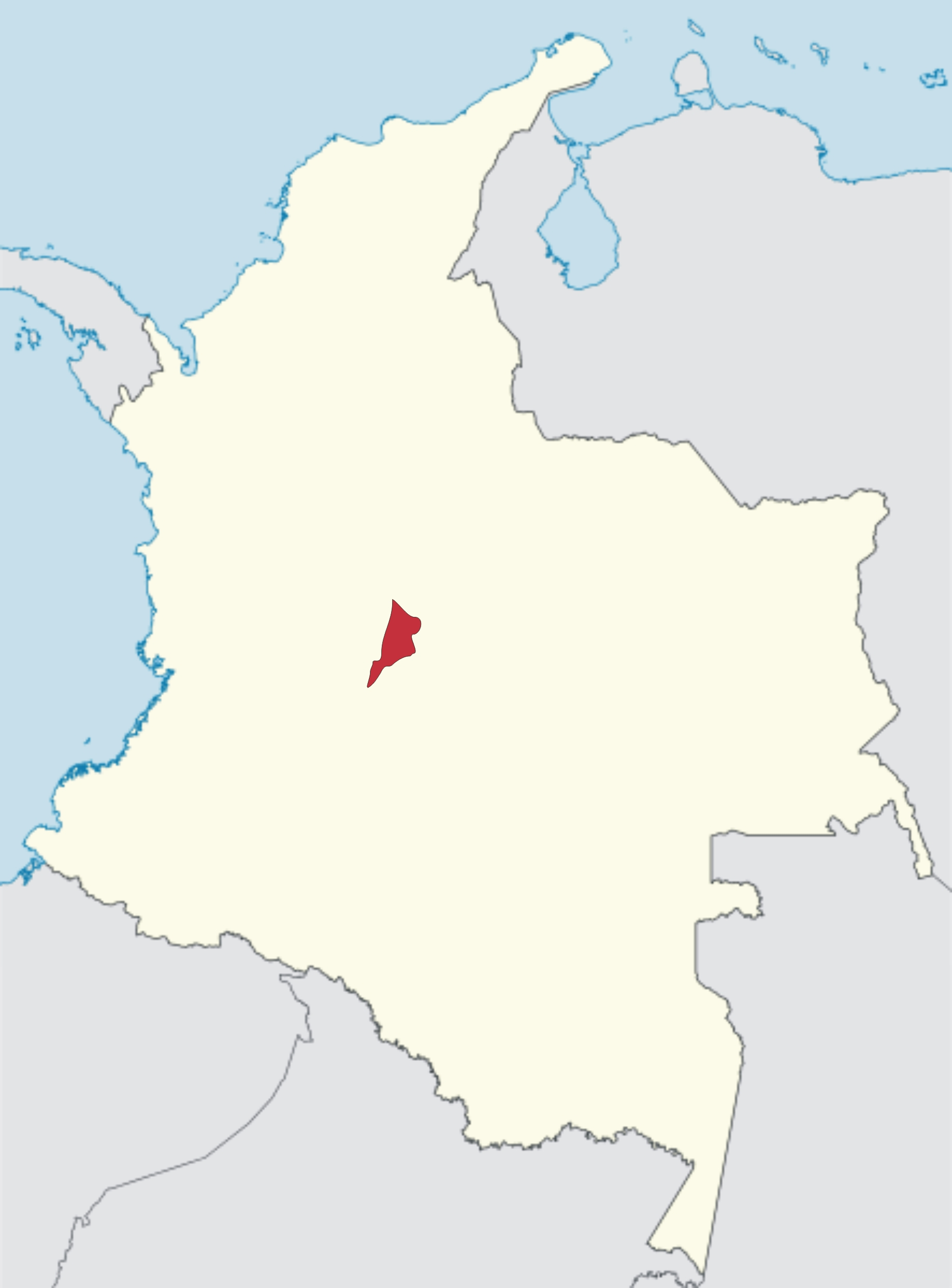
- Map of the archdiocese within Colombia

Website
- www.arquibogota.org.co

The Archdiocese of Bogotá (Spanish: Arquidiócesis Metropolitana de Bogotá; Latin: Archidioecesis Metropolitae Bogotensis) is a Latin Church ecclesiastical territory of the Catholic Church in Colombia. It was established in 1562 as the Diocese of Santa Fe en Nueva Granada, elevated to an archdiocese two years later, and was given its current name in 1891. It serves nearly 3.8 million Catholics in Bogotá and parts of the Cundinamarca Department, and covers a total area of 4,109 km^{2} (1,552 square miles). The current metropolitan archbishop is Luis José Rueda Aparicio since 2020.

The archdiocese is the metropolitan see of the Ecclesiastical Province of Bogotá, which includes six suffragan dioceses:

- Engativá
- Facatativá
- Fontibón
- Girardot
- Soacha
- Zipaquirá

The archdiocese's territory covers 14 of the 20 localities (administrative districts) of the city of Bogotá and 11 municipalities in the Cundinamarca Department. Prior to 2003, when three new urban dioceses were created, the archdiocese included all of Bogotá. The mother church of the archdiocese, and the seat of the archbishop, is the Cathedral-Basilica of the Immaculate Conception, located in Bolívar Square in Bogotá. Besides the archbishop, Luis José Rueda Aparicio, the archdiocese has two auxiliary bishops, Luis Manuel Alí Herrera and Pedro Manuel Salamanca Mantilla. The archdiocese is served by around 800 priests, 100 deacons, and nearly 1,500 religious sisters.

The Archdiocese of Bogotá has 275 parishes, containing numerous churches. The archdiocese runs two seminaries, the Major Seminary of Bogotá, which enrolls seminarians from the Archdiocese of Bogotá and other dioceses, and the Seminario Intermisional San Luis Beltrán, which trains priests for ministry in Colombia's missionary territories. It also contains several universities, dozens of secondary schools and primary schools. The archdiocese also runs a spiritual retreat house, a care center for physically and mentally disabled children, and a migrant charity foundation, among other ministries.

== Structure ==
=== Territory ===
Map of the Archdiocese of Bogotá

The Archdiocese of Bogotá covers a total area of 4,109 km^{2} (1,552 square miles). The archdiocese has a total population of 4.4 million, of whom 3.8 million (86%) are Catholic. Its territory includes 14 of the 20 localities (administrative districts) of the city of Bogotá and 11 municipalities in the Cundinamarca Department. The Cundinamarca municipalities are: La Calera, Cáqueza, Fómeque, Choachí, Une, Chipaque, Fosca, Quetame, Ubaque, Guayabetal, and Gutiérrez. The Archdiocese of Bogotá included the entire city of Bogotá until 2003, when the three new urban dioceses of Engativá, Fontibón, and Soacha were created.

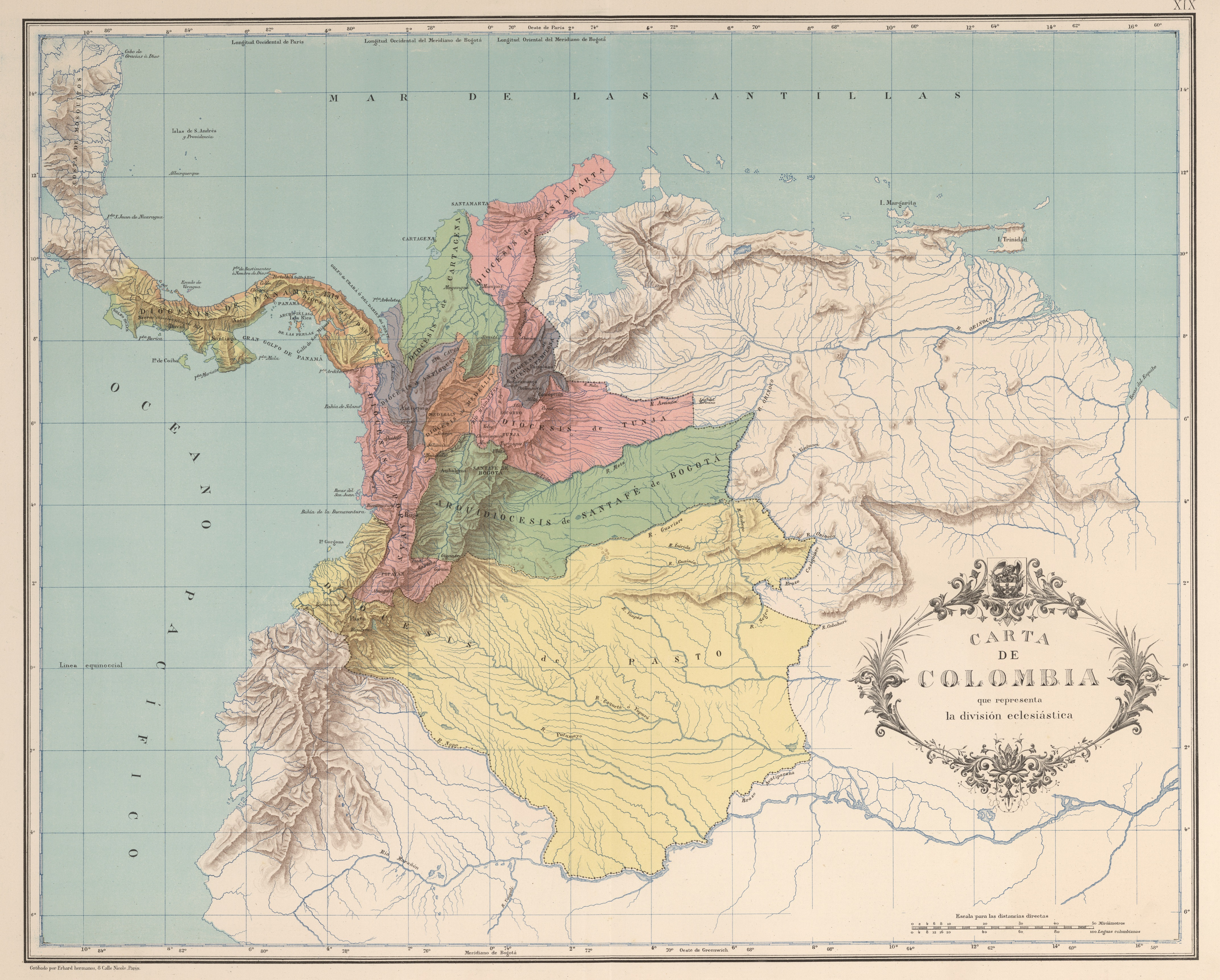
Map of dioceses in Colombia in 1890. The Archdiocese of Bogotá is the lower green area.

At the time of its establishment in 1564, the Archdiocese of Bogotá included much of what would become Colombia, as well as part of what is now western Venezuela. Beginning in the 1770s, the archdiocese gradually lessened in size as territory was split off to create new dioceses. Territory that was once part of the Archdiocese of Bogotá now comprises the Archdiocese of Mérida (in Venezuela), the Archdiocese of Antioquía, the Archdiocese of Nueva Pamplona, the Archdiocese of Tunja, the Archdiocese of Ibagué, the Diocese of Garzón, the Archdiocese of Villavicencio, and Bogotá's six suffragan sees: the Diocese of Zipaquirá, the Diocese of Girardot, the Diocese of Facatativá, the Diocese of Engativá, the Diocese of Fontibón, and the Diocese of Soacha.

==== Pastoral divisions ====
The Archdiocese of Bogotá is divided into eight vicariates, pastoral divisions covering a certain area that each contain a number of parishes and are each headed by an episcopal vicar. Each vicariate is subdivided into a number of arciprestazgos, or deaneries, which are each headed by an archpriest (dean). The vicariates are:

Episcopal vicariate	Territory	Deaneries	Parishes	Episcopal vicar	Ref.
Vicariate of the Immaculate Conception Vicaría Inmaculada Concepción	Central Bogotá (including cathedral)	8	54	Daniel Arturo Delgado Guana	
Vicariate of Christ the Priest Vicaría Cristo Sacerdote	Northeastern Bogotá	7	42	Carlos Julio López Ramírez	
Vicariate of the Holy Spirit Vicaría Espíritu Santo	Southwestern Bogotá	6	44	Luis Augusto Campos Flórez	
Vicariate of St. John Vicaría San José	Southeastern Bogotá, Chipaque, Caqueza, Une, Quetame, Fosca, Gutiérrez, Guayabetal, Choachí, Fómeque & Ubaque	7	47	Julio Hernando Solórzano Solórzano	
Vicariate of St. Peter Vicaría San Pedro	Northern Bogotá	5	26	Germán Medina Acosta	
Vicariate of St. Paul Vicaría San Pablo	Southeastern Bogotá		33	Alberto Forero Castro	
Vicariate of the Merciful Father Vicaría Padre Misericordioso	Parts of Bogotá	6	30	Alberto José Ojalvo Prieto	
Vicariate of St. Elizabeth of Hungary Vicaría Santa Isábel de Hungría					

=== Personnel ===
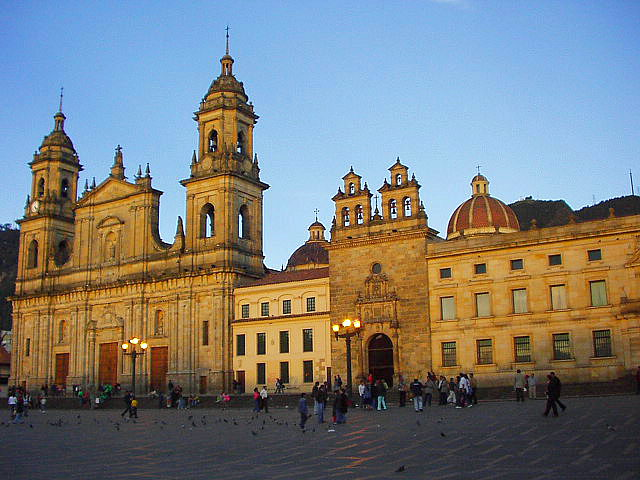
Cathedral of Bogotá next to Sacred Chapel and Archiepiscopal Palace

The metropolitan archdiocese is led by its metropolitan archbishop, Luis José Rueda Aparicio. The Metropolitan Archbishop of Bogotá also holds the title Primate of Colombia. The archbishop is assisted by auxiliary bishops, the number of which has varied throughout history, from just one to as many as six. Currently, there are two auxiliary bishops, Luis Manuel Alí Herrera and Pedro Manuel Salamanca Mantilla. The archdiocese also has a chancellor, who heads the chancery, which is responsible for all archdiocesan records and publications. The current chancellor is Ricardo Alfonso Pulido Aguilar. Additionally, there are eight episcopal vicars who oversee a vicariate, or region, within the archdiocese.

The archdiocese is served by approximately 740 priests, including more than 300 diocesan priests, and around 425 religious priests, or priests who are members of religious institutes. There are also 130 deacons, a number that has increased from just 20 in 2001. In addition, there are 1,450 religious sisters and nuns living and working in the archdiocese.

=== Ecclesiastical province ===
Map of the Ecclesiastical Province of Bogotá

The Archdiocese of Bogotá is the metropolitan see of the Ecclesiastical Province of Bogotá, which, in addition to the archdiocese, includes the six suffragan dioceses of Engativá, Facatativá, Fontibón, Girardot, Soacha, and Zipaquirá. The Archbishop of Bogotá is the metropolitan archbishop of the ecclesiastical province, and as such, holds some authority over the suffragan bishops of the other dioceses.

== Education ==
=== Seminaries ===
Seminary	Location	Oversight	Est.
Major Seminary of Bogotá	Bogotá	Archdiocese	1581
Seminario Intermisional San Luis Beltrán	Bogotá	Archdiocese	1961
Seminario Redemptoris Mater de Bogotá	Bogotá	Neocatechumenal Way	2005

=== Universities ===
University	Location	Oversight	Est.
Catholic University of Colombia	Bogotá	Archdiocese	1970
Del Rosario University	Bogotá	Private	1653
Pontifical Xavierian University	Bogotá	Society of Jesus	1623
Saint Thomas Aquinas University	Bogotá	Dominican Order	1580

=== Secondary schools ===
School	Location	Oversight	Est.
Aspaen Gimnasio Iragua	Bogotá	Private (Opus Dei)	1968
Colegio Agustiniano Norte	Bogotá	Order of Augustinian Recollects	1969
Colegio Augustiniano Ciudad Salitre	Bogotá	Order of Augustinian Recollects	
Colegio Franciscano del Virrey Solis	Bogotá	Franciscans	
Colegio Jordán de Sajonia	Bogotá	Dominican Order	1954
Colegio de la Presentación Centro	Bogotá	Dominican Sisters of the Presentation	
Colegio de la Presentación Las Ferias	Bogotá	Dominican Sisters of the Presentation	
Colegio de la Presentación Luna Park	Bogotá	Dominican Sisters of the Presentation	
Colegio de la Presentación Sans Façon	Bogotá	Dominican Sisters of the Presentation	1898
Colegio del Sagrado Corazón De Jesus	Bogotá	Bethlehemite Sisters	
Colegio Salesiano de Leon XIII	Bogotá	Salesians of Don Bosco	1890
Colegio San Bartolomé La Merced	Bogotá	Society of Jesus	1941
Colegio San Carlos	Bogotá	Order of Saint Benedict	1961
Colegio San Felipe Neri	Bogotá	Congregation of the Oratory	1965
Colegio De La Salle	Bogotá	De La Salle Brothers	
Colegio San Viator	Bogotá	Clerics of Saint Viator	1963
Colegio Santa Francisca Romana	Bogotá	Congregation of Our Lady of Lourdes	1963
Colegio Santa María	Bogotá	Private	1963
Colegio del Santo Ángel	Bogotá	Sisters of the Guardian Angel	
Colegio Santo Tomás de Aquino	Bogotá	Dominican Order	
Gimnasio Los Caobos	Bogotá	Society of Jesus	1991
Instituto San Juan de Dios	Bogotá	Brothers Hospitallers of St. John of God	1948
Instituto de la Virgen de Fátima (closed)	Bogotá		

== Ordinaries ==
=== Archbishops of Santa Fe en Nueva Granada ===
1. Juan de los Barrios, OFM (22 March 1564 – 12 February 1569)
2. Luis Zapata de Cárdenas, OFM (8 January 1570 – 24 February 1590)
3. Alfonso López de Avila (29 November 1591 – 30 December 1591)
4. Bartolomé Martinez Menacho y Mesa (30 April 1593 – 17 August 1594)
5. Bartolomé Lobo Guerrero (12 August 1596 – 19 November 1607)
6. Juan Castro, OSA (7 January 1608 – June 1609)
7. Pedro Ordóñez y Flórez (19 April 1610 – 11 June 1614)
8. Hernando de Arias y Ugarte (January 1618 – 30 July 1625)
9. Julián de Cortázar (7 April 1625 – 31 October 1630)
10. Bernardino de Almansa Carrión (15 December 1631 – 26 September 1633)
11. Cristóbal de Torres, OP (8 January 1635 – 8 July 1654)
12. Juan de Arguinao y Gutiérrez, OP (10 November 1659 – 1678)
13. Antonio Sanz Lozano (22 February 1681 – 28 May 1688)
14. Ignacio de Urbina, OSH (26 September 1690 – 9 April 1703)
15. Francisco de Cosío y Otero (14 January 1704 – 29 November 1715)
16. Francisco del Rincón, OM (5 October 1716 – 28 June 1723)
17. Antonio Claudio Álvarez de Quiñones (29 January 1725 – 21 October 1736)
18. Juan de Galavís, O. Praem (3 March 1738 – 14 November 1739)
19. Diego Fermín de Vergara, OSA (12 December 1740 – 7 February 1744)
20. Pedro Felipe de Azúa e Iturgoyen (18 December 1744 – 11 August 1753)
21. José Javier de Arauz y Rojas (2 June 1754 – February 1764)
22. Manuel Sosa Betencourt (22 April 1765 – 12 November 1765)
23. Francisco Antonio de la Riva Mazo (9 December 1765 – 8 December 1768)
24. Lucas Ramírez Galán, OFM (21 August 1769 – 12 December 1770)
25. Agustín Manuel Camacho y Rojas, OP (28 September 1771 – 13 April 1774)
26. Agustín de Alvarado y Castillo (13 March 1775 – 14 December 1778)
27. Antonio Caballero y Góngora (14 December 1778 – 15 September 1788)
28. Baltasar Jaime Martínez de Compañón (15 December 1788 – 17 August 1797)
29. Fernando del Portillo y Torres, OP (29 October 1798 – 20 January 1804)
30. Juan Bautista Sacristán y Galiano (20 August 1804 – 1 February 1817)
31. Isidoro Domínguez, CRM (23 August 1819 – April 1822)
32. Fernando Caycedit Florez (19 July 1827 – 17 February 1832)
33. Manuel José Mosquera y Arboleda (21 September 1835 – 10 December 1853)
34. Antonio Herrán y Zaldúa (21 January 1855 – 6 February 1868)
35. Vicente Arbeláez Gómez (6 February 1868 – 29 June 1884)
36. José Telésforo Paúl, SJ (6 August 1884 – 8 April 1889)
37. Ignacio León Velasco, SJ (6 October 1889 – 10 April 1891)
38. Bernardo Herrera Restrepo (4 June 1891 – 2 January 1928)

=== Archbishops of Bogotá ===
1. Bernardo Herrera Restrepo (4 June 1891 – 2 January 1928)
2. Ismael Perdomo Borrero (2 January 1928 – 3 June 1950)
3. Crisanto Luque Sánchez (14 July 1950 – 7 May 1959); Cardinal in 1953
4. Luis Concha Córdoba (18 May 1959 – 22 July 1972); Cardinal in 1961
5. Aníbal Muñoz Duque (29 July 1972 – 25 June 1984); Cardinal in 1973
6. Mario Revollo Bravo (25 June 1984 – 27 December 1994); Cardinal in 1988
7. Pedro Rubiano Sáenz (27 December 1994 – 8 Jul 2010); Cardinal in 2001
8. Rubén Salazar Gómez (8 July 2010 – 24 April 2020); Cardinal in 2012
9. Luis José Rueda Aparicio (25 April 2020 – present); Cardinal in 2023

== Other affiliated bishops ==
=== Coadjutor archbishops ===
- Vicente Arbeláez Gómez (1864-1868)
- Rubén Isaza Restrepo (1964-1967), did not succeed to see; appointed Coadjutor Archbishop of Cartagena

=== Auxiliary bishops ===
- José Carrión y Marfil (25 June 1784 – 18 December 1786), appointed Bishop of Cuenca, Ecuador
- José Antonio Chaves, OFM (20 January 1834 – 3 March 1856)
- Indalecio Barreto (21 March 1873 – 16 January 1874), appointed Bishop of Nueva Pamplona
- Mosé Higuera (7 April 1876 – 4 March 1884), appointed Auxiliary Bishop of Medellín
- Leonidas Medina (27 March 1916 – 7 March 1923), appointed Bishop of Socorro
- Luis Andrade Valderrama, OFM (3 March 1939 – 16 June 1944), appointed Bishop of Antioquía
- Emilio de Brigard Ortiz (29 July 1944 – 6 March 1986), Archbishop (personal title) in 1961
- Luis Pérez Hernández, CIM (3 November 1945 – 29 May 1956), appointed Bishop of Cúcuta
- José de Jesús Martinez Vargas (1951 – 18 Dec 1952), appointed Bishop of Armenia
- Pablo Correa León (10 November 1956 – 22 July 1959), appointed Bishop of Cúcuta
- José Gabriel Calderón Contreras (18 December 1958 – 26 April 1962), appointed Bishop of Cartago
- Rubén Buitrago Trujillo, OAR (25 February 1971 – 8 July 1974), appointed Bishop of Zipaquirá
- Alfonso López Trujillo (25 February 1971 – 22 May 1978), Archbishop (personal title); appointed Coadjutor Archbishop of Medellín; future Cardinal
- Mario Revollo Bravo (13 November 1973 – 28 February 1978), appointed Archbishop of Nueva Pamplona; later returned here as Archbishop; future Cardinal
- Víctor Manuel López Forero (6 May 1977 – 6 December 1980), appointed Bishop of Socorro y San Gil
- Ramón Darío Molina Jaramillo, OFM (6 May 1977 – 23 March 1984), appointed Bishop of Montería
- Luis Gabriel Romero Franco (6 May 1977 – 15 April 1986), appointed Bishop of Socorro y San Gil
- Jorge Ardila Serrano (27 October 1980 – 21 May 1988), appointed Bishop of Girardot
- Guillermo Alvaro Ortiz Carrillo (3 May 1986 – 16 February 1989), appointed Coadjutor Bishop of Garagoa
- Enrique Sarmiento Angulo (3 May 1986 – 6 Aug 2003), appointed Bishop of Fontibón
- Fabio Suescún Mutis (3 May 1986 – 20 November 1993), appointed Bishop of Pereira
- Agustín Otero Largacha, OAR (3 May 1986 – 9 May 2004)
- Oscar Urbina Ortega (8 March 1996 – 9 November 1999), appointed Bishop of Cúcuta
- José Ruiz Arenas (8 March 1996 – 16 July 2002), appointed Bishop of Villavicencio
- Fernando Sabogal Viana (8 March 1996 – 1 December 2013)
- Daniel Caro Borda (21 July 2000 – 6 August 2003), appointed Bishop of Soacha
- José Roberto Ospina Leongómez (19 April 2004 – 10 May 2012), appointed Bishop of Buga
- Francisco Antonio Nieto Súa (22 October 2008 – 2 February 2011), appointed Bishop of San José del Guaviare
- Luis Manuel Alí Herrera (7 Nov 2015 – )
- Pedro Manuel Salamanca Mantilla (7 Nov 2015 – )

=== Other priests of this diocese who became bishops ===
- Bernardino Medina y Moreno (1843 - 16 February 1856), appointed Bishop of Cartagena
- Eduardo Maldonado Calvo (19 December 1885 – 25 July 1905), appointed Bishop of Tunja
- Alfredo Rubio Díaz (7 November 1926 – 7 July 1953), appointed Auxiliary Bishop of Santa Marta
- Alberto Uribe Urdaneta (8 November 1942 – 19 December 1953), appointed Auxiliary Bishop of Manizales
- Gabriel Montalvo Higuera (18 January 1953 – 14 June 1974), appointed nuncio and titular archbishop
- Héctor Luis Gutiérrez Pabón (22 September 1962 – 13 February 1987), appointed Auxiliary Bishop of Cali
- Héctor Cubillos Peña (29 November 1974 – 15 February 2002), appointed Auxiliary Bishop of Bucaramanga
- Luis Alberto Parra Mora (9 October 1971 – 18 October 2003), appointed Bishop of Mocoa-Sibundoy
- José Daniel Falla Robles (28 November 1992 – 15 April 2009), appointed Auxiliary Bishop of Cali
- Mario Eduardo Dorsonville (23 November 1985 – 1999), appointed Auxiliary Bishop of Washington, DC, U.S. in 2015
- Luis Augusto Campos Flórez (8 December 1982 - 12 December 2019), appointed Bishop of Socorro y San Gil

== See also ==
- Catholic Church in Colombia
- Episcopal Conference of Colombia
- History of Bogotá
- List of Catholic dioceses in Colombia
