= Tulio Botero =

Colombian ecclesiastic

Monsignor Tulio Botero Salazar
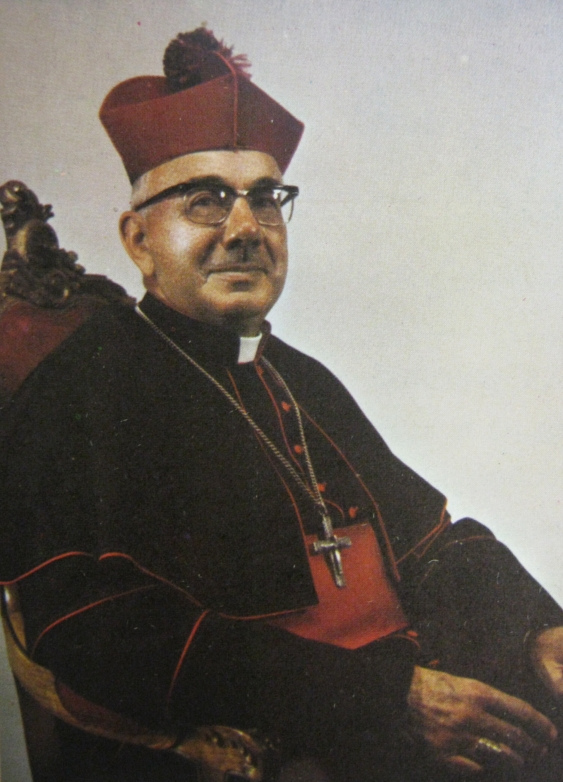
- Church: Roman Catholic Church
- Predecessor: Joaquín García Benítez
- Successor: Alfonso López Trujillo

Orders
- Ordination: 19 December 1931 in Bogotá by Mons. Ismael Perdomo Borrero, 39.° Metropolitan Archbishop of Bogotá
- Consecration: 14 August 1949 in Manizales, Caldas by Mons. Bernardo Botero Álvarez, Bishop of Santa Marta

Personal details
- Born: 9 March 1904 Manizales, Caldas, Colombia
- Died: 1 March 1981 (aged 76) Medellín, Antioquia, Colombia
- Denomination: Catholic
- Residence: Colombia
- Education: Del Rosario University
- Motto: Lumen Semitis Meis

- Coat of arms

Tulio Botero Salazar, C.M. (Manizales, 1 March 1904 — Medellín, 1 March 1981), was a Colombian ecclesiastic of the Catholic Church, belonging to the Congregation of the Mission. He was auxiliary bishop of the Archdiocese of Cartagena, first bishop of the Diocese of Zipaquirá and archbishop of the Archdiocese of Medellín.

== Life and work ==
=== Early years ===
He was born in Manizales on 9 March 1904. His parents were Francisco Botero Jaramillo and Maria Francisca Salazar Jaramillo, both belonging to traditional Caldense families of Antioquian origins and cousins between them.

Botero was baptized in the old Manizales Cathedral on 13 March of the same year, under the name of Francisco Tulio, by Father Benjamín Muñoz. He did his primary studies with the Marist Brothers and his secondary (high school) studies with the Lazarist Fathers (Congregation of the Mission) in Santa Rosa de Cabal, Risaralda.

After the death of his father, he retired from the apostolic and studied law for a year at the Colegio del Rosario. He joined the community of the Lazarist Fathers and began the internal seminary (novitiate) on 27 February 1924, joining the community through vows in 1926.

=== Priesthood ===
He was ordained a priest in Bogotá by Ismael Perdomo Borrero on 19 December 1931. Until 1934, he missioned in Cundinamarca with Father Nicanor Cid. From 1934 to 1941, he worked at the Popayán Seminary. From 1941 to 1948, he was director of the Internal Seminary and director of students in Bogotá (headquarters of the Congregation of the Mission); simultaneously, from 1945, he was private secretary of the apostolic nunciature. In 1948 he was appointed rector of the Tunja Seminary.

== Episcopate ==
=== Auxiliary Bishop of Cartagena ===
On 7 May 1949, he was named titular bishop of Marida and auxiliary bishop of Cartagena. He was consecrated in Manizales by Bernardo Botero Álvarez on 14 August 1949. He remained in Cartagena from 7 September 1949 to May 1952.

=== Bishop of Zipaquirá ===
From Cartagena, he passed to the newly created Diocese of Zipaquirá, when Pope Pius XII, through the papal bull of 1 May 1952, appointed him as its first bishop. He took canonical possession of the diocese on 15 August of the same year, thus beginning the new ecclesiastical jurisdiction.

Because of his great devotion to the Virgin, Botero asked the Holy Father to declare her the patron saint of the new diocese, under the title of the Assumption. Pius XII, accepting his request, issued the papal bull of 2 August 1952, by which he appointed the Blessed Virgin of the Assumption as patron of the diocese.

Among Botero's priorities for the new diocese was the Council Seminary; thus, on 8 December of the same year, he blessed and laid the first stone for the construction of his headquarters and, on 24 February 1953, he opened the minor seminary under the direction of the Vincentian Fathers.

To help in the solution of certain economic problems of some seminarians, he created the San Pio X Foundation; to help the presbytery, he created the Clergy Relief Fund.

His interest in Catholic education led him to support and encourage the creation of diocesan colleges in most parishes; his love for Mary and his desire to promote Marian piety led to the first Marian Congress being held in August 1954.

Because of his interest in the spiritual formation of the faithful, he established a Diocesan House called House of Mary Immaculate; he also promoted the foundation of the San José Social Center for the comprehensive training of workers. In support of the peasants, he created the Casa Campesina Parroquial with its own statutes.

In July 1956, he organized the first Diocesan Catechetical Congress with the participation of all the parishes, and ended his pastoral work in the diocese with the first pastoral week in December 1957.

=== Archbishop of Medellin ===
On 8 December of that same year, he was appointed to the Archbishop's Headquarters of Medellín, of which he took possession on 2 February 1958.

Botero Salazar participated as Council Father in the four sessions of the Second Vatican Council. He was one of the forty bishops who signed the Pact of the Catacombs of Domitilla, through which they committed to sharing time with the poor, assuming a simple lifestyle and renouncing all symbols of power.

In Medellín, he reformed the archdiocesan curia; he built the current building of the Major Seminary in the Loreto sector; allowed the entry of various religious communities; held the third diocesan synod; had Miguel Antonio Medina Medina and Octavio Betancourt Arango as auxiliary bishops and Alfonso López Trujillo as coadjutor archbishop, who later succeeded him at the See.

He established 124 parishes; he personally ordained 158 priests and the other bishops ordained 45 more priests; that is, in his administration, 203 priests were ordained in total.

He promoted the Faculty of Theology at the Universidad Pontificia Bolivariana and allowed seminarians to study at said university; he founded the Bachilleres seminary, which lasted forty years. He established Casa Pablo VI in 1971 and gave it statutes in 1977, for special vocations of students who had to work to financially support their families.

=== Resignation and death ===
In 1979, after 21 years at the head of the episcopal see of Medellin, his resignation was accepted due to his age.

He died on 1 March 1981.

Catholic Church titles
Preceded by Jaquín Guillermo García	Archbishop of Medellín; 2 February 1958 – 2 June 1979	Succeeded by Alfonso López Trujillo
Preceded by New Title	Bishop of Zipaquirá; 15 August 1952 – 8 December 1957	Succeeded by Buenaventura Jáuregui Prieto
Preceded by -	Titular Bishop of Marida and Auxiliary Bishop of Cartagena; 14 August 1949 – 1 May 1952	Succeeded by -

== See also ==
- Roman Catholic Archdiocese of Medellín
- Roman Catholic Diocese of Zipaquirá
- Episcopal Conference of Colombia

== Bibliography ==
- Piedrahita Echeverri, Javier (1988), Arquidiócesis de Medellín: episcopologio y presbiterio 1868-1988, Medellín, Colombia
