= José Daniel Falla Robles =

Colombian bishop (1956–2021)

- Bishop of Soacha
- Church: Catholic Church
- Diocese: Diocese of Soacha
- In office: 29 June 2016 – 1 May 2021
- Predecessor: Daniel Caro Borda
- Successor: Juan Carlos Barreto Barreto
- Previous posts: Titular Bishop of Calama (2009-2016); Auxiliary Bishop of Cali (2009-2016)

Orders
- Ordination: 28 November 1992 by Mario Revollo Bravo
- Consecration: 20 June 2009 by Pedro Rubiano Sáenz

Personal details
- Born: 7 October 1956 Bogotá, Colombia
- Died: 1 May 2021 (aged 64) Soacha, Cundinamarca Department, Colombia

José Daniel Falla Robles (7 October 1956 – 1 May 2021) was a Colombian Roman Catholic bishop.

He was born in Colombia and ordained to the priesthood in 1992. He served as titular bishop of Calama and as auxiliary bishop of the Roman Catholic Archdiocese of Cali, Colombia, from 2009 to 2016 and as bishop of the Roman Catholic Diocese of Soacha, Colombia, from 2016 until his death from COVID-19 on 1 May 2021 in Soacha during the COVID-19 pandemic in Colombia.
