= Alfonso López Trujillo =

Colombian Catholic cardinal (1935–2008)

His Eminence Alfonso López Trujillo
- President of the Pontifical Council for the Family
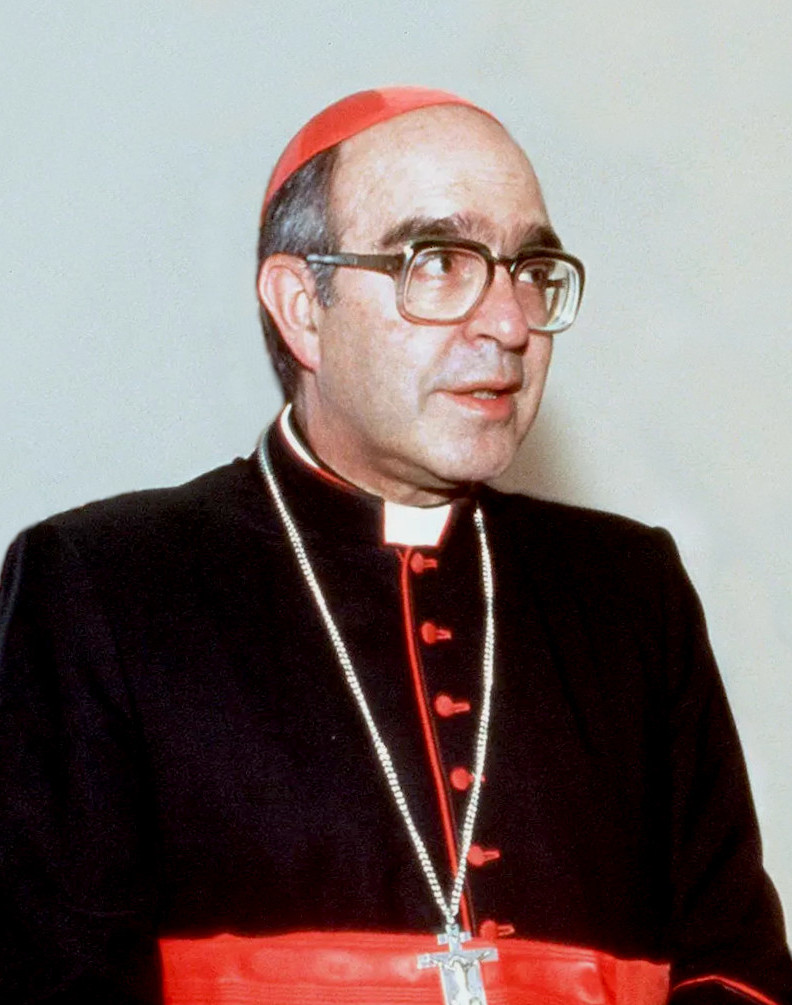
- Church: Roman Catholic Church
- Appointed: 8 November 1990
- Term ended: 19 April 2008
- Predecessor: Édouard Gagnon
- Successor: Ennio Antonelli
- Other post: Cardinal-Bishop of Frascati (2001–08)
- Previous posts: Titular Bishop of Boseta (1971–78); Auxiliary Bishop of Bogotá (1971–78); Secretary General of the Latin American Episcopal Council (1972–79); Coadjutor Archbishop of Medellín (1978–79); President of the Latin American Episcopal Council (1979–83); Archbishop of Medellín (1979–91); Cardinal-Priest of Santa Prisca (1983–2001); President of the Colombian Episcopal Conference (1987–90)

Orders
- Ordination: 13 November 1960 by José Gabriel Calderón Contreras
- Consecration: 25 March 1971 by Aníbal Muñoz Duque
- Created cardinal: 2 February 1983 by Pope John Paul II
- Rank: Cardinal-Priest (1983–2001); Cardinal-Bishop (2001–08)

Personal details
- Born: Alfonso López Trujillo; 8 November 1935 Villahermosa, Colombia
- Died: 19 April 2008 (aged 72) Clinic Pio XI, Rome, Italy
- Education: National University of Colombia; Pontifical University of Saint Thomas Aquinas; Pontifical Theological Faculty Teresianum
- Motto: Veritas et caritate
- Signature: Alfonso López Trujillo's signature

- Coat of arms: Alfonso López Trujillo's coat of arms

Styles of Alfonso López Trujillo
- Reference style: His Eminence
- Spoken style: Your Eminence
- Religious style: Cardinal
- Posthumous style: not applicable
- Informal style: Cardinal
- See: Frascati (suburbicarian see), Medellín (emeritus)

Alfonso López Trujillo (8 November 1935 – 19 April 2008) was a Colombian Cardinal Bishop of the Roman Catholic Church and president of the Pontifical Council for the Family.

== Biography ==
=== Youth ===
Born in Villahermosa, Tolima, López Trujillo moved to Bogotá as a young boy and attended the National University of Colombia before he entered the seminary in order to become a priest. Trujillo completed his studies in Rome, earning a doctorate in philosophy from the Pontifical University of St. Thomas Aquinas (Angelicum) and completing studies in sociology, anthropology and philosophy.

=== Ordination ===
He was ordained a priest on 13 November 1960 and, after studying in Rome for an additional two years, returned to Bogotá where he taught philosophy at the local seminary for four years. In 1968, he organized the new pastoral department of the Archdiocese of Bogotá, and from 1970 to 1972, he was Vicar General of the archdiocese. In early 1971, Pope Paul VI appointed him titular archbishop of Boseta and Auxiliary of Bogotá.

=== CELAM ===
In 1972, López Trujillo was elected general secretary of the Latin American Episcopal Conference, a post he held until 1984. Well known for his dislike and distrust of the radical social agenda espoused by many Latin American priests and bishops, in this capacity he led the opposition to liberation theology and succeeded in watering down or reversing many of the reforms made in that forum.

Andrew Sullivan, an American pro-LGBT activist, writing in the New York magazine, has claimed that he would go with paramilitaries into rural areas and slums, and tell them which priests were involved with social work or believed in liberation theology, which often caused the paramilitaries to murder those priests or force them into hiding or exile One of his major accomplishments during that period was to organize the third general conference of Latin American Bishops in 1979, in which Pope John Paul II participated. That same year, he became Archbishop of Medellín.

=== Cardinal in Rome ===
Archbishop López Trujillo was named Cardinal-Priest of Santa Prisca by John Paul II in the consistory of 2 February 1983, becoming the youngest cardinal until 1991. He was promoted to the order of Cardinal Bishops on 17 November 2001. In 1990, López Trujillo was named president of the Pontifical Council for the Family. He assumed the office in 1991.

=== Positions ===
As president of the Pontifical Council for the Family, López Trujillo was a highly influential proponent of conservative values, particularly on sexual matters and liberation theology. He advocated abstinence as an effective solution in the prevention of HIV/AIDS. He reaffirmed the Church's teaching that the use of condoms is immoral, and sought to discourage condom use among Catholics and in Catholic-run health facilities by stating that they are ineffective in preventing the transmission of HIV– a claim that was opposed by some scientists and by the World Health Organization.

In 2003, Cardinal Trujillo stated in a BBC documentary that the "scientific community accepts" that the HIV virus can pass through condoms. This claim was refuted by the World Health Organization as "scientifically incorrect" in a formal statement, reflecting their position that condoms provide effective protection against HIV transmission. The Cardinal later provided additional context for his comment in a statement. He attributed his assertion that the virus can pass through microscopic pores in latex to two papers by Catholic authors (Jacques Suaudeau and J.P. M Lelkens), citing studies which "hypothesize that ... the process of vulcanization could contribute to the irregularity of the latex surface and the presence of microscopic pores." The Cardinal's statement did not repeat his previously implied claim of scientific consensus on conclusions from those studies.

He was opposed to the concept of gay marriage, abortion (a stance that won him much praise and support from groups such as the Society for the Protection of Unborn Children) and embryological research, warning Catholics involved in the creation of embryos as part of IVF treatment for infertility that they would be excommunicated.

=== 2005 conclave ===
López Trujillo participated in the 2005 Papal conclave, which elected Pope Benedict XVI. López Trujillo was one of the cardinals considered papabile at the 2005 conclave. Upon the death of the pope, all major Vatican officials automatically lost their positions during the sede vacante. Like the others, López Trujillo was reappointed to his previous office by Pope Benedict XVI on 21 April 2005.

=== Allegations of homosexual promiscuity ===
An article (republished from The Telegraph, UK) in The Sydney Morning Herald stated, referring to Frédéric Martel's book In the Closet of the Vatican, "According to the book, a leading figure in this hidden world was Alfonso López Trujillo, a Colombian cardinal who in public was stridently anti-gay and pro-family but in private slept with male prostitutes." A further article in The New York Times reviewing Martel's book suggests Trujillo "prowled the ranks of seminarians and young priests for men to seduce" and "routinely hired male prostitutes, sometimes beating them up after sex".

=== Death ===
Following a four-week hospitalization, Cardinal López Trujillo died on 19 April 2008 in Rome, aged 72, due to a respiratory infection. His funeral Mass was held on 23 April 2008 in St. Peter's Basilica. Cardinal Angelo Sodano was principal celebrant of the Mass, and Pope Benedict XVI delivered the homily and performed the final absolution.

Catholic Church titles
Preceded by Tulio Botero Salazar	Archbishop of Medellín; 1979–1991	Succeeded by Héctor Rueda Hernández
Preceded by Édouard Gagnon	President of the Pontifical Council for the Family; 1990–2008	Succeeded by Ennio Antonelli
Preceded by Paolo Bertoli	Cardinal-Bishop of Frascati; 17 November 2001 – 18 April 2008	Succeeded by Tarcisio Bertone
