= Diocese of Zipaquirá =

Diocese of the Catholic Church in Colombia

Coordinates: 5.0239°N 74.0037°W

Diocese of Zipaquirá Dioecesis Zipaquirensis

Catholic

Location
- Country: Colombia
- Ecclesiastical province: Bogotá

Statistics
- Area: 7,163 km^{2} (2,766 sq mi)
- Population: Total; Catholics: (as of 2004); 575,540; 521,300 (90.6%)

Information
- Rite: Latin Rite
- Established: 1 September 1951 (75 years ago)
- Cathedral: Catedral de la Santísima Trinidad (Cathedral of the Holy Trinity)

Current leadership
- Pope: Leo XIV
- Bishop: Héctor Cubillos Peña

Map

Website
- diocesisdezipaquira.org

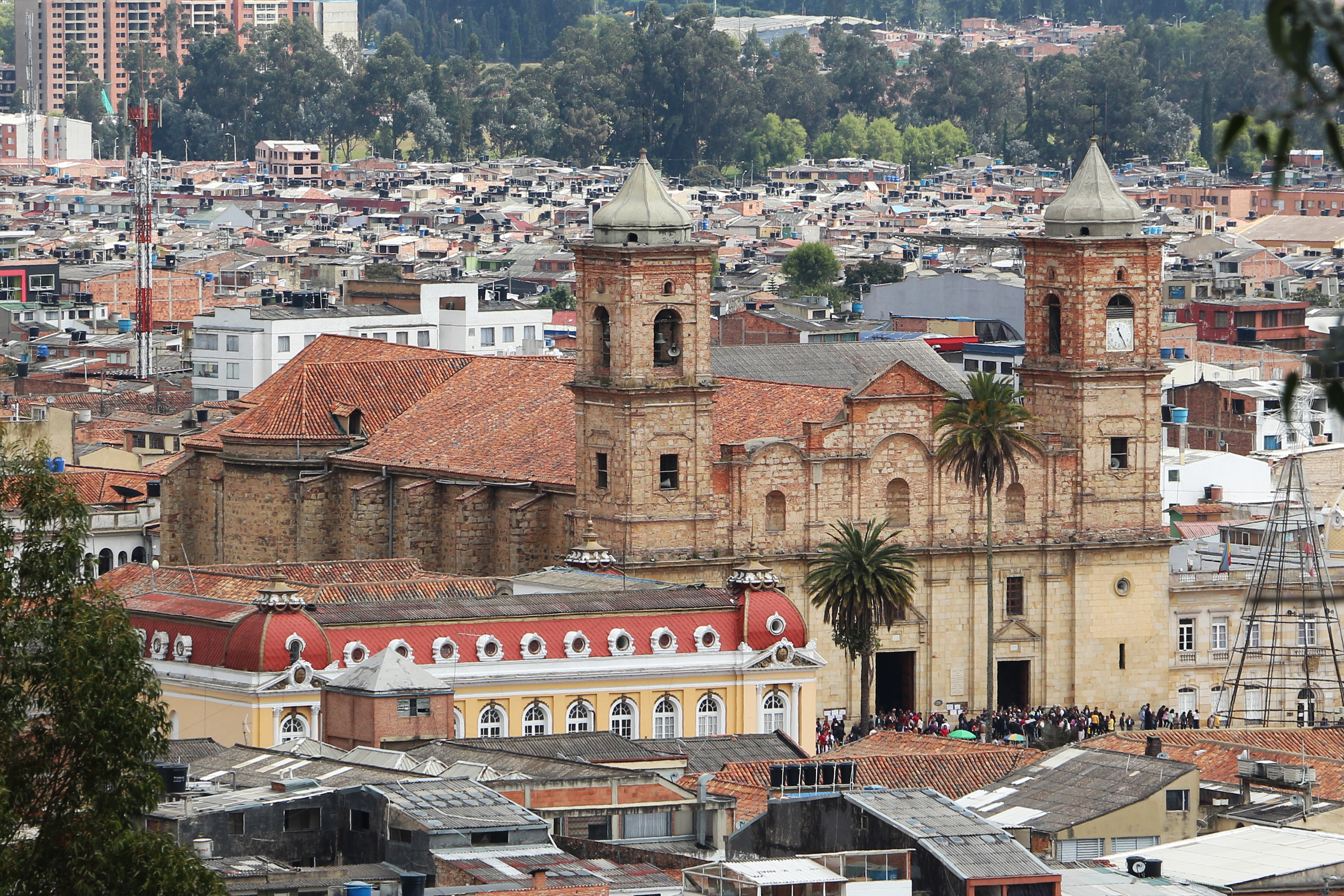
Cathedral of the Most Holy Trinity

The Roman Catholic Diocese of Zipaquirá (Latin: Zipaquirensis) is a diocese located in the city of Zipaquirá in the ecclesiastical province of Bogotá in Colombia.

== History ==
It was established on September 1, 1951, as the Diocese of Zipaquirá, from the Metropolitan Archdiocese of Bogotá.

== Special churches ==
- Minor Basilicas:
  - Basilica de Santo Cristo de Ubaté, Ubaté
  - Basilica de San Jacinto de Guasca, Guasca.

The Salt Cathedral of Zipaquirá is in the diocese, but is administratively an ordinary church; the title "cathedral" is unofficial.

== Bishops ==
=== Ordinaries ===
- Tulio Botero Salazar, C.M. (1952.05.01 – 1957.12.08) Appointed, Archbishop of Medellín
- Buenaventura Jáuregui Prieto (1957.12.08 – 1974.07.08)
- Rubén Buitrago Trujillo, O.A.R. (1974.07.08 – 1991.09.27)
- Jorge Enrique Jiménez Carvajal, C.I.M. (1992.11.09 – 2004.02.06) Appointed, Coadjutor Archbishop of Cartagena
- Héctor Cubillos Peña (2004.06.30 – present)

=== Other priests of this diocese who became bishops ===
- Fernando Sabogal Viana, appointed Auxiliary Bishop of Bogotá in 1996
- Daniel Caro Borda, appointed Auxiliary Bishop of Bogotá in 2000
- Hernán Alvarado Solano, appointed Vicar Apostolic of Guapi in 2001
- Raúl Alfonso Carrillo Martínez, appointed Vicar Apostolic of Puerto Gaitán in 2016

== See also ==
- Roman Catholicism in Colombia
