= Diocese of Soacha =

Diocese of the Catholic Church in Colombia

Coordinates: 4°35′14″N 74°13′17″W

Diocese of Soacha Dioecesis Soachaensis Diócesis de Soacha

Catholic

Location
- Country: Colombia
- Metropolitan: Archdiocese of Bogotá
- Headquarters: Soacha, Cundinamarca Department, Colombia

Statistics
- Area: 425 km^{2} (164 sq mi)
- Population: Total; Catholics: (as of 2023); 1,654,000; 1,390,000 (84.0%)
- Parishes: 46

Information
- Denomination: Catholic Church
- Sui iuris church: Latin Church
- Rite: Roman Rite
- Established: 6 August 2003; 23 years ago
- Cathedral: Catedral de Jesucristo Nuestra Paz
- Secular priests: 86 (74 Diocesan, 12 Religious Orders)

Current leadership
- Pope: Leo XIV
- Bishop: Juan Carlos Barreto Barreto
- Metropolitan Archbishop: Luis José Rueda Aparicio
- Bishops emeritus: Daniel Caro Borda

Map

The Roman Catholic Diocese of Soacha (Latin: Soachaënsis) is a diocese located in the city of Soacha in the ecclesiastical province of Bogotá in Colombia.

== History ==
- 6 August 2003: Established as Diocese of Soacha from the Metropolitan Archdiocese of Bogotá

== Leadership ==
=== Bishops of Soacha ===
- Daniel Caro Borda (6 August 2003 – 29 June 2016), retired
- José Daniel Falla Robles (29 June 2016 – 1 May 2021)
  - Apostolic Administrator Luis José Rueda Aparicio (13 May 2021 – 25 June 2022), Archbishop of Bogotá
- Juan Carlos Barreto Barreto (25 April 2022 – Present)

== See also ==
- Roman Catholicism in Colombia
