= Jorge Ardila Serrano =

Jorge Ardila Serrano (September 17, 1927, Zapatoca, Colombia – October 12, 2010, Girardot, Colombia) was the Roman Catholic bishop of the Roman Catholic Diocese of Girardot, Colombia.

Ordained to the priesthood on October 17, 1948, he was appointed auxiliary bishop of the Roman Catholic Archdiocese of Bogota on October 27, 1980, and was ordained on November 30, 1980. In 1988, he was appointed bishop of the Girardot Diocese retiring in 2001.
