= José Telésforo Paúl =

Colombian Catholic bishop and Jesuit

The Most Reverend José Telésforo Paúl y Vargas, SJ
- Archbishop of Santafé en Nueva Granada
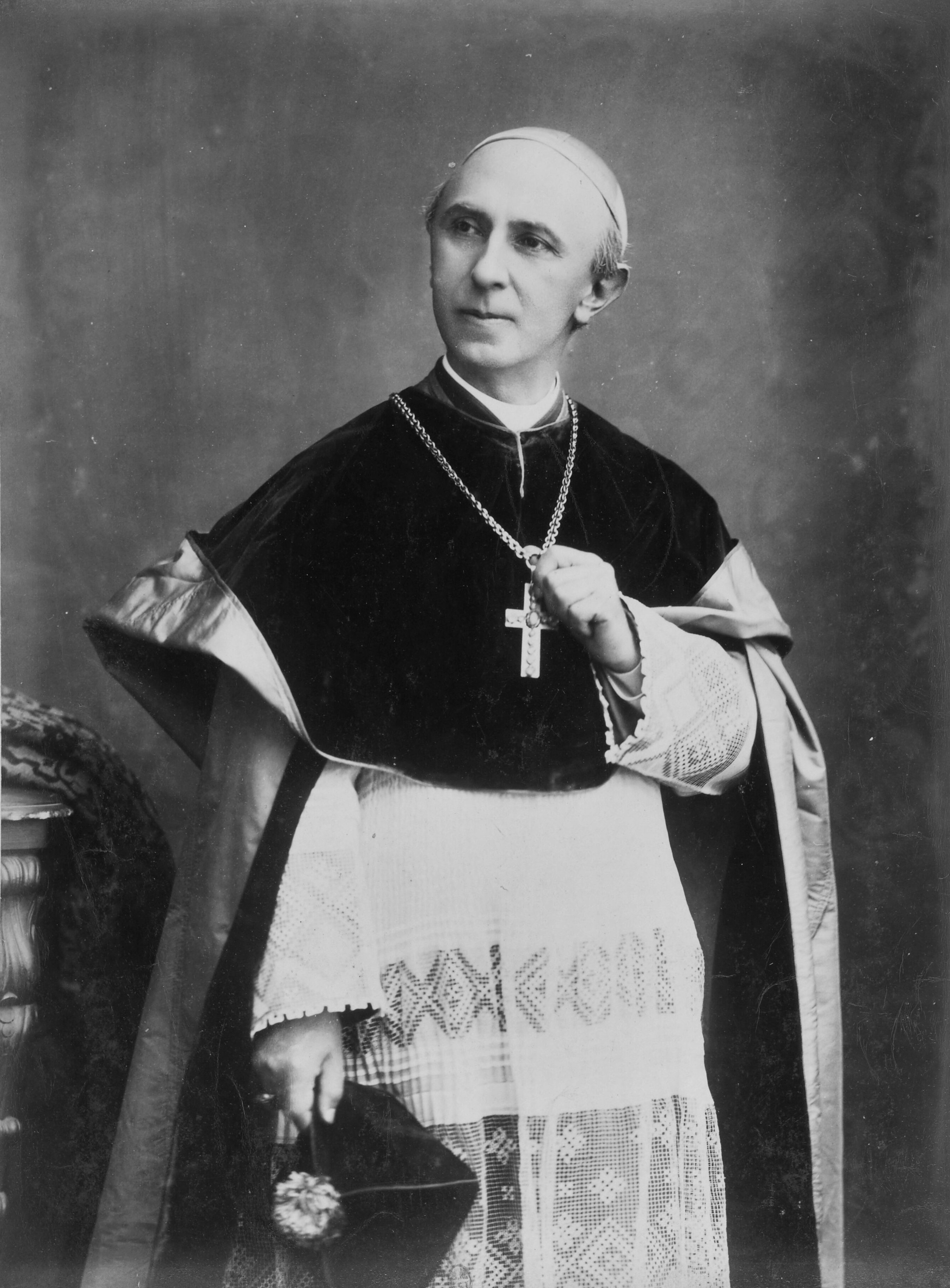
- Church: Catholic Church
- Archdiocese: Santafé en Nueva Granada
- Province: Santafé en Nueva Granada
- Appointed: 6 August 1884
- Installed: 14 November 1884
- Term ended: 8 April 1889
- Predecessor: Vicente Arbeláez Gómez
- Successor: Ignacio León Velasco, SJ
- Previous post: Bishop of Panamá (1876–1884)

Orders
- Ordination: 5 December 1855
- Consecration: 25 March 1876 by Ignacio Antonio Parra

Personal details
- Born: 5 January 1831 Bogotá, Colombia
- Died: 8 April 1889 (aged 58) La Mesa, Cundinamarca, Colombia
- Education: Del Rosario University

José Telésforo Paúl y Vargas, SJ (5 January 1831 – 8 April 1889) was a Colombian Catholic bishop and Jesuit who worked in Panama and Colombia. Born in Bogotá, he served as bishop of Panamá from 1876 to 1884 and as archbishop of Santafé en Nueva Granada (now the Archdiocese of Bogotá, Colombia) from 1884 until his death in 1889.

== Biography ==
=== Early life and education ===
José Telésforo Paúl y Vargas was born on 5 January 1831 in Bogotá, Colombia. The son of Rafael Paúl y Motta, a Venezuelan lawyer, and Florentina Vargas Gaitán, he had two siblings, Felpie Fermín and Rafaela.

After studying at the Colegio Mayor de Nuestra Señora del Rosario, Paúl entered the Society of Jesus at age 13 at their house in Popayán. In 1850, already a teacher at the Colegio Mayor de San Bartolomé in Bogotá, he went into exile with other Jesuits due to the Society's persecution by General Hilario Lopez. After leaving Bogotá, he traveled to Europe, where he continued his studies in Belgium, France, and Loyola, Spain. Through his education, he became a notable Christian humanist and polyglot, speaking and writing in four or five languages fluently.

=== Priesthood ===
Paúl was ordained a priest on 5 December 1855, and was assigned to the Seminario de Guatemala in Guatemala City, where he taught rhetoric and the humanities. When the anti-Jesuit persecution ended in Colombia in 1858, his superiors sent him back to Bogotá, where he rose to prominence as a teacher, orator, and counselor. In 1861, he was exiled from Colombia for the second time, this time by President Tomás Cipriano de Mosquera. He returned to Guatemala, where he was a professor of theology at the seminary and was also mastor of novices for the Guatemalan Jesuits. In 1869, he was sent with the Rev. Roberto Pozo to found a new Jesuit residence in San Salvador, but were expelled in 1872 by Salvadoran President Santiago González, along with other religious orders.

Paúl and the other Jesuits moved to Ecuador, before being invited to Panama State (at that time an autonomous province of Colombia) by President Buenaventura Correoso. He taught there at the diocesan seminary and later was superior of the Jesuits in Panama, with his seat at the Church of St. Francis in Panama City.

=== Bishop of Panama ===
On 17 September 1875, Paúl was appointed Bishop of Panamá by Pope Pius IX. He succeeded Ignacio Antonio Parra, who consecrated him bishop on 25 March 1876, making Paúl the first bishop consecrated in Panama.

As bishop of Panamá, Paúl reorganized and established parishes, made frequent pastoral visits to different communities, and made efforts to improve the discipline and education of the clergy. He also took special interest in the construction of the Panama Canal, construction of which began in 1881 by France. Paúl became friends with Ferdinand de Lesseps, the French diplomat in charge of the project, and blessed the work at the start of construction. He eventually became a trusted advisor and counselor of Lesseps, who described Paúl as "the most illustrious prelate I have ever met." In addition, he paid special attention to providing religious care to residents of the Panama Canal Zone, dividing it into three different districts and ensuring the regular visit of Panamanian priests.

Paúl made pastoral visits through the diocese several times, and worked to establish schools and hospitals, and invited the Daughters of Charity of St. Vincent de Paul to staff many of them. He wrote pastoral letters, which encouraged evangelism and Catholic education, condemned the conflict of liberalism with Catholicism, and addressed the relationship between church and state. In 1877, Paúl personally had traveled to the Congress of Colombia to demand respectful treatment of the church by the government.

=== Archbishop of Bogotá ===
Following the death of Archbishop Vicente Arbeláez Gómez, Paúl was appointed archbishop of Santafé en Nueva Granada (now Bogotá) on 6 August 1884 by Pope Leo XIII. There, he participated in the drafting of the new Colombian Constitution of 1886. He died on 8 April 1889 in Bogotá, aged 58.

== Episcopal lineage ==
- Cardinal Scipione Rebiba
- Cardinal Giulio Antonio Santorio (1566)
- Cardinal Girolamo Bernerio, OP (1586)
- Archbishop Galeazzo Sanvitale (1604)
- Cardinal Ludovico Ludovisi (1621)
- Cardinal Luigi Caetani (1622)
- Cardinal Ulderico Carpegna (1630)
- Cardinal Paluzzo Paluzzi Altieri degli Albertoni (1666)
- Pope Benedict XIII (1675)
- Pope Benedict XIV (1724)
- Archbishop Enrico Enríquez (1743)
- Bishop Manuel Quintano Bonifaz (1749)
- Cardinal Francisco Antonio de Lorenzana (1765)
- Bishop Atanasio Puyal y Poveda (1790)
- Bishop Andrés Esteban y Gómez (1815)
- Bishop Salvador Jiménez y Padilla (1816)
- Bishop Jose Antonio Chaves, OFM (1834)
- Bishop Bernabé Rojas, OP (1855)
- Bishop Domingo Antonio Riaño Martínez (1855)
- Archbishop Antonio Herrán y Zaldúa (1855)
- Archbishop Vicente Arbeláez Gómez (1860)
- Bishop Ignacio Antonio Parra (1871)
- Archbishop José Telésforo Paúl y Vargas, SJ (1876)
