= Pedro Rubiano Sáenz =

Colombian Catholic cardinal (1932–2024)

His Eminence Pedro Rubiano Sáenz
- Cardinal, Archbishop of Bogotá
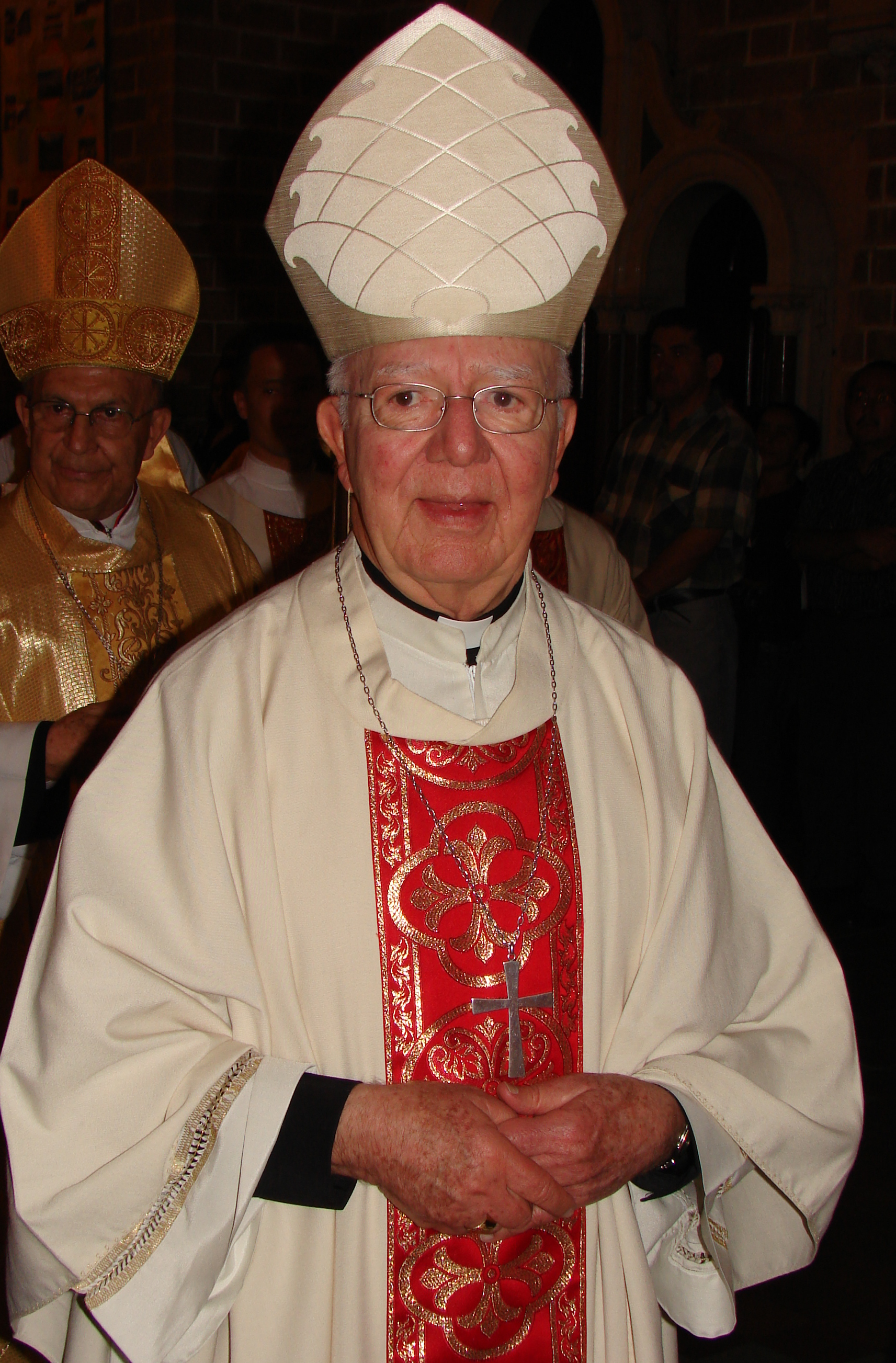
- See: Bogotá
- Installed: 27 December 1994
- Term ended: 8 July 2010
- Predecessor: Mario Revollo Bravo
- Successor: Rubén Salazar Gómez
- Previous posts: Bishop of Cúcuta (1972–1983); Archbishop Coadjutor of Cali (1983–1985); Archbishop of Cali (1985–1994)

Orders
- Ordination: 5 July 1956 by Julio Caicedo Téllez
- Consecration: 11 July 1971 by Angelo Palmas
- Created cardinal: 8 February 2001 by Pope John Paul II
- Rank: Cardinal Priest

Personal details
- Born: 13 September 1932 Cartago, Colombia
- Died: 15 April 2024 (aged 91) Bogotá, Colombia
- Denomination: Catholic Church
- Motto: Caritas Christi urget us Latin: The Love of Christ compels us
- Coat of arms

Styles of Pedro Rubiano Sáenz
- Reference style: His Eminence
- Spoken style: Your Eminence
- Religious style: Cardinal
- Informal style: Cardinal
- See: Bogotá

Pedro Rubiano Sáenz (Spanish: [ˈpeðɾo ru'βjano 'saens]; 13 September 1932 – 15 April 2024) was a Colombian prelate of the Catholic Church who was Archbishop of Bogotá from 1995 to 2010. He was Bishop of Cúcuta from 1972 to 1983, and Archbishop of Cali from 1985 to 1994 after two years as coadjutor there. Pope John Paul II made him a cardinal in 2001.

== Biography ==
=== Early life and ordination ===
Pedro Rubiano Sáenz was born in Cartago, Colombia, on 13 September 1933, the fourth of six sons born to Pedro Rubiano and Tulia Sáenz. He attended the Colegio de María Auxiliadora and the Colegio Ramírez, then the Diocesan College of Santa Teresita in the Bitaco neighborhood, and then at the minor seminaries of Cali and Popayán. He studied at the seminary in Popayán and the Université Laval in Quebec, where he earned his licentiate in sacred theology. He was ordained a priest of the Archdiocese of Cali on 8 July 1956 from Bishop Julio Caicedo y Téllez. He then studied at Catholic University in Washington and at the Institute for Social Studies of Santiago de Chile. He fulfilled a variety of pastoral assignments in the 15 years following his ordination, including chaplain of the Marco Fidel Suárez Military Aviation School, the Santa Librada national school, and the Nuestra Señora de los Remedios clinic. He was pastor and founder of the parishes of San Pedro Claver and Nuestra Señora de la Providencia. By 1971 he was pastoral vicar of the archdiocese and vice-rector of the Major School "Santiago di Cali".

=== Bishop and archbishop ===
On 2 June 1971, Pope Paul VI named him bishop of Cúcuta. He received his episcopal consecration on 11 July 1972 in Cali from Archbishop Angelo Palmas, Nuncio to Colombia. Pope John Paul II appointed him Coadjutor Archbishop of Cali on 26 March 1983 and he succeeded as archbishop there on 7 February 1985.

From 1983 to 1989 he was vice president of the International Commission for Migration and Refugees based in Geneva. From April 1990 to January 1991, he was apostolic administrator of the Diocese of Popayán.

Pope John Paul transferred him to the metropolitan see of Bogotá on 27 December 1994. He was installed there on 11 February 1995. On 12 October 1995, he was made a member of the Pontifical Council for the Pastoral Care of Migrants and Itinerants. One of his most significant initiatives was the creation of the Archdiocesan Food Bank, which continued to operate as long as he lived.

On 4 August 1995, he established the National Conciliation Commission in the hope that a broad and diverse coalition might help resolve Colombia's political divisions and end armed conflict.

Rubiano Sáenz was elected to a three-year term as president of the Colombian Bishops Conference in 1990 and re-elected in 1993.

=== Cardinal ===
Pope John Paul made Rubiano Sáenz Cardinal-Priest of Trasfigurazione di Nostro Signore Gesù Cristo in the consistory of 21 February 2001. He was made a member of the Congregation for Catholic Education on 15 May 2001 and his membership on the Pontifical Council for Migrants was renewed on 18 May 2001.

In 2002, he was elected to another term as president of the Colombian Bishops Conference. He was also president of the economic committee of the Episcopal Council of Latin America (CELAM) from May 2003 to July 2007.

In 2003, he oversaw the creation of three new suffragan dioceses from the territory of the Archdiocese of Bigotá: Engativá, Fontibón and Soacha.

Rubiano Sáenz was one of the cardinal electors who participated in the 2005 papal conclave that elected Pope Benedict XVI.

In 2006, as Colombia's Constitutional Court considered an abortion rights case, Rubiano Sáenz warned of the danger posed by a Latin American country breaking from the region's universal ban on abortion. He wrote: "The loss of one country will substantially weaken the pro-life fabric of all of Latin America. What begins as a small hole will end as a huge tear allowing much evil to come in." In May, after the Court ruled that abortion could not be punished in certain cases, he wrote that "decriminalizing abortion, even in the cases indicated by the ruling of the Constitutional Court, does not change either the seriousness of the fact or the moral judgment of abortion.... What is legal is not always moral."

On 31 January 2008, he mocked the idea that achieving peace between the government of Colombia and the FARC rebels required the intervention of Venezuela's president Hugo Chavez. He said: "The only thing left is to kneel down before Chavez! I believe we Colombians have dignity."

In July 2009, he advised Colombian president Álvaro Uribe against seeking a third term as president. He said: "Two terms is a lot. He has carried out important work for the good of the country and for peace. It would be better for him if after finishing his second term he left office and later on ran again."

Pope Benedict accepted Rubiano Sáenz's resignation as Archbishop of Bogotá on 8 July 2010, three years after he had submitted it.

Rubiano Sáenz was apostolic administrator of the archdiocese until the installation of his successor, Archbishop Rubén Salazar Gómez, on 13 August 2010.

=== Death ===
Rubiano Sáenz died at his residence in Bogotá on 15 April 2024 at the age of 91.

== Honors ==
Rubiano Sáenz was honoured with the following:

- Order of Boyacá
- Sovereign Military Order of Malta
- Order pro merito Melitensi

== See also ==
- Catholic Church in Colombia

Catholic Church titles
Preceded by Alberto Giraldo Jaramillo	Bishop of Cúcuta; 2 June 1971 – 26 March 1983	Succeeded by Oscar Urbina Ortega
New title	Archbishop Coadjutor of Cali; 26 March 1983 – 7 February 1985	succeeded as archbishop
Preceded by Alberto Uribe Urdaneta	Archbishop of Cali; 7 February 1985 – 27 December 1994	Succeeded by Isaías Duarte Cancino
Preceded by Mario Revollo Bravo	Archbishop of Bogotá; 27 December 1994 – 8 July 2010	Succeeded by Rubén Salazar Gómez
Titular church created	Cardinal-Priest of Trasfigurazione di Nostro Signore Gesù Cristo; 21 February 2001 – 15 April 2024	Succeeded by Pablo Virgilio David
