= Rubén Salazar Gómez =

Colombian prelate (born 1942)

His Eminence Rubén Salazar Gómez
- Cardinal, Metropolitan Archbishop Emeritus of Bogotá; Primate Emeritus of Colombia
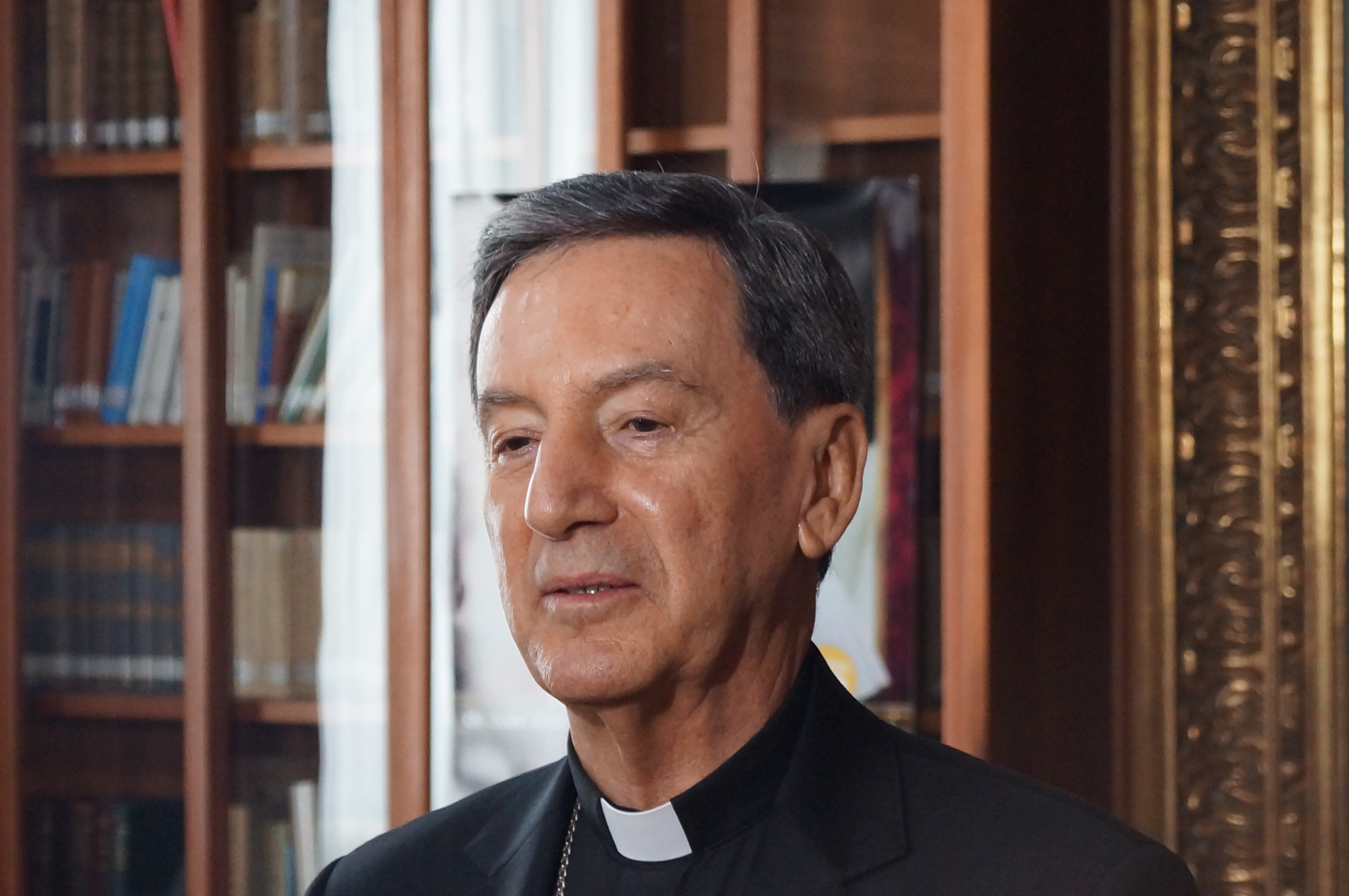
- Archdiocese: Bogotá
- Appointed: 8 July 2010
- Installed: 13 August 2010
- Term ended: 25 April 2020
- Predecessor: Pedro Rubiano Sàenz
- Successor: Luis José Rueda Aparicio
- Other post: Cardinal-Priest of San Gerardo Maiella
- Previous posts: Bishop of Cúcuta (1992–1999); Metropolitan Archbishop of Barranquilla (1999–2010)

Orders
- Ordination: 20 May 1967 by José Joaquín Flórez Hernández
- Consecration: 25 March 1992 by Paolo Romeo
- Created cardinal: 24 November 2012 by Pope Benedict XVI
- Rank: Cardinal-Priest

Personal details
- Born: 22 September 1942 (age 84) Bogotá, Colombia
- Denomination: Roman Catholic
- Motto: Tunc Dixi Ecce Venio (English:Behold I have come as I said)
- Coat of arms: Rubén Salazar Gómez's coat of arms

Styles of Rubén Salazar Gómez
- Reference style: His Eminence
- Spoken style: Your Eminence
- Informal style: Cardinal
- See: Bogotá

Jesús Rubén Darío Salazar Gómez (Spanish pronunciation: [ruˈβen salaˈsaɾ ˈɣomes]; born 22 September 1942) is a Colombian prelate of the Catholic Church who was Metropolitan Archbishop of Bogotá from 2010 to 2020. He was made a cardinal in 2012. He was Metropolitan Archbishop of Barranquilla from 1999 to 2010.

== Early life and ministry ==
Jesús Rubén Darío Salazar Gómez was born in Bogotá, Colombia, in 1942. He completed his high school studies and philosophy at the seminary of Ibagué. He later completed his theological studies at the Pontifical Gregorian University in Rome, obtaining a licentiate in dogmatic theology. He obtained his Licentiate in Sacred Scripture at the Pontifical Biblical Institute in Rome.

He was ordained a priest on 20 May 1967 and then held various positions including: pastor, seminary professor, director of the Department of Social Pastoral of the Colombian Episcopal Conference, and Vicar for Pastoral Care.

== Bishop ==
He was named Bishop of Cúcuta on 11 February 1992 and was consecrated on 25 March. On 18 March 1999 he was appointed Archbishop of Barranquilla. He was appointed Archbishop of Bogotá on 8 July 2010. He took possession of the see on 13 August. During his installation, Salazar Gómez said that he would be focusing on three priorities: "protecting marriage as the union between one man and one woman, saving innocent life in the womb, and promoting peace in Colombia". Referring to the work of his predecessor, Cardinal Rubiano Sáenz, he said that "I will support each and every one of you with the affection of a father, a brother, a friend, because we have an arduous common task." He added that it is necessary "to discern together the will of the Lord for his people and to strengthen the conditions that will make possible a joint evangelizing endeavour."

== Cardinal ==
He was created a cardinal by Pope Benedict XVI in a consistory on 24 November 2012. As Cardinal-Priest of San Gerardo Maiella.

On 31 January 2013, Pope Benedict XVI named him a member of the Pontifical Commission for Latin America and the Pontifical Council for Justice and Peace.

He participated as a cardinal elector in the 2013 papal conclave that elected Pope Francis.

Pope Francis appointed him a member of the Congregation for Bishops on 16 December 2013. In May 2015, he was elected to a four-year term as president of the Latin American Bishops Conference (CELAM).

On 25 April 2020, Pope Francis accepted his resignation as Archbishop of Bogota and appointed Luis José Rueda Aparicio to succeed him.

On 8 March 2022 Salazar was admitted to hospital suffering heart problems and after surgery to insert a stent he remained in intensive care.

Catholic Church titles
Preceded by Alberto Giraldo Jaramillo	Bishop of Cúcuta; 11 February 1992 – 18 March 1999	Succeeded by Oscar Urbina Ortega
Preceded by Félix María Torres Parra	Archbishop of Barranquilla; 18 March 1999 – 8 July 2010	Succeeded by Jairo Jaramillo Monsalve
Preceded by Luis Augusto Castro Quiroga	President of the Colombian Episcopal Conference; 3 July 2008 – 9 July 2014	Succeeded by Luis Augusto Castro Quiroga
Preceded by Pedro Rubiano Sáenz	Archbishop of Bogotá; 8 July 2010 – 25 April 2020	Succeeded by Luis José Rueda Aparicio
Preceded by Baltazar Enrique Porras Cardozo	First Vice-President of the Latin American Episcopal Council; 19 May 2011 – 13 May 2015	Succeeded by Carlos María Collazzi Irazábal
Preceded by Kazimierz Świątek	Cardinal-Priest of San Gerardo Maiella; 24 November 2012 –	Incumbent
Preceded by Carlos Aguiar Retes	President of the Latin American Episcopal Council; 13 May 2015 – 15 May 2019	Succeeded by Héctor Miguel Cabrejos Vidarte
