= Fernando Sabogal Viana =

Fernando Sabogal Viana (28 May 1941 − 1 December 2013) was a Colombian Roman Catholic bishop.

Ordained to the priesthood on 22 January 1967, Viana was named auxiliary bishop of the Roman Catholic Archdiocese of Bogotá and was also named titular bishop of Muteci on 8 March 1996 and died while still in office on 1 December 2013.
