= Intendencia Oriental y Llanos de San Martín =

Intendencia Oriental y Llanos de San Martín was the name of a Roman Catholic Vicariate Apostolic in the province of Saint Martin, in Colombia, South America, created on 24 March 1908, and entrusted to the Society of Mary.

It took the place of two former Apostolic prefectures, one created on 23 June 1903, and the other on 8 January 1904, after negotiations (dating from 1902) between the Holy See and the Colombian Government for the evangelization of these vast provinces.

Surrounded by the Cordilleras, and watered by the Río Batatas, Garagoa, Guavio, Humades, Meta, and Orinoco Rivers, the territory was still inhabited largely by indigenous native people, in the early 20th century numbering about 50,000, of whom scarcely 10,000 have been baptized.

== See also ==
- Intendente
