= Mario Revollo Bravo =

Colombian prelate

His Eminence Mario Revollo Bravo
- Cardinal; Archbishop Emeritus of Bogotá
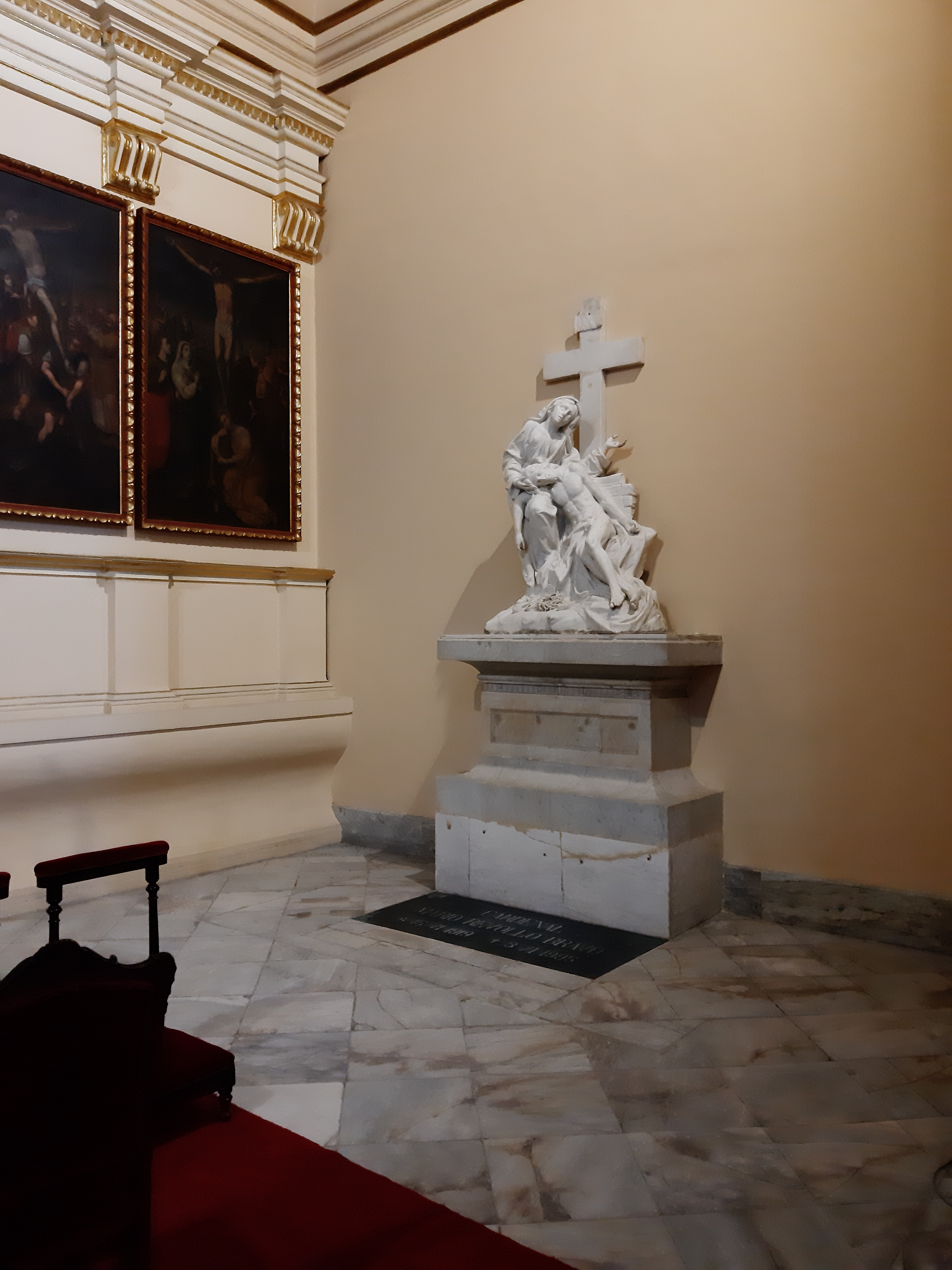
- Tomb at the Primatial Cathedral of Bogotá
- Appointed: 25 June 1984
- Term ended: 13 August 1994
- Predecessor: Aníbal Muñoz Duque
- Successor: Pedro Rubiano Sáenz
- Other post: Cardinal-Priest of San Bartolomeo all'Isola (1988-95)
- Previous posts: Titular Bishop of Thinisa in Numidia (1973-78); Auxiliary Bishop of Bogotá (1973-78); President of the Colombian Episcopal Conference (1978-84); Archbishop of Nueva Pamplona (1978-84); Military Vicar of Colombia (1984-85)

Orders
- Ordination: 31 October 1943 by Luigi Traglia
- Consecration: 2 December 1973 by Aníbal Muñoz Duque
- Created cardinal: 28 June 1988 by Pope John Paul II
- Rank: Cardinal-Priest

Personal details
- Born: Mario Revollo Bravo; 15 June 1919 Genoa, Kingdom of Italy
- Died: 3 November 1995 (aged 76) Bogotá, Colombia
- Education: Pontifical Gregorian University; Pontifical Biblical Institute
- Motto: Vis pacis
- Coat of arms

Mario Revollo Bravo (19 September 1919 - 3 November 1995) was a Colombian prelate of the Catholic Church who was archbishop of Bogotá from 1984 to 1994. He was made a cardinal in 1988.

== Biography ==
Styles of Mario Revollo Bravo
- Reference style: His Eminence
- Spoken style: Your Eminence
- Religious style: Cardinal
- Informal style: Cardinal
- See: Bogotá

Mario Revollo Bravo was born in Genoa, Italy, where his father was Colombian consul in that city. He was the third of the six children. He was ordained 31 October 1943 in Rome by Cardinal Luigi Traglia.

Pope Paul VI appointed him an auxiliary bishop of Bogotá on 13 November 1973. He was elected president of the Episcopal Conference of Colombia in 1978 and held that position until Pope John Paul II transferred him to the metropolitan see of Bogotá on 25 June 1984.

Pope John Paul II made Revollo Bravo Cardinal-Priest of San Bartolomeo all'Isola in the consistory of 1988. He retired as archbishop in 1994. He died on 3 November 1995.

Catholic Church titles
Preceded by Aníbal Muñoz Duque	Archbishop of Bogotá; 25 June 1984–27 December 1994	Succeeded by Pedro Rubiano Sáenz
