= Luis José Rueda Aparicio =

Colombian archbishop

His Eminence Luis José Rueda Aparicio
- Cardinal, Metropolitan Archbishop of Bogotá; Primate of Colombia
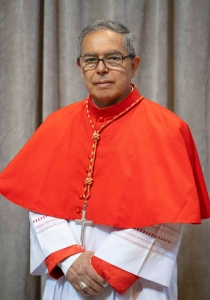
- Archdiocese: Bogotá
- See: Bogotá
- Appointed: 25 April 2020
- Installed: 11 June 2020
- Predecessor: Rubén Salazar Gómez
- Other post: Cardinal Priest of San Luca a Via Prenestina (2023-)
- Previous posts: Bishop of Montelíbano (2012–2018); Metropolitan Archbishop of Popayán (2018–2020)

Orders
- Ordination: 23 November 1989 by Jorge Leonardo Gómez Serna
- Consecration: 14 April 2012 by Aldo Cavalli
- Created cardinal: 30 September 2023 by Pope Francis
- Rank: Cardinal Priest

Personal details
- Born: 3 March 1962 (age 64) San Gil, Santander, Colombia
- Denomination: Catholic
- Education: Alphonsian Academy
- Coat of arms

Styles of Luis José Rueda Aparicio
- Reference style: His Eminence
- Spoken style: Your Eminence
- Religious style: Cardinal
- Informal style: Cardinal

Ordination history of Luis José Rueda Aparicio
History
Priestly ordination
- Ordained by: Jorge Leonardo Gómez Serna
- Date: 23 November 1989
Episcopal consecration
- Consecrated by: Aldo Cavalli
- Place: 14 April 2012
Cardinalate
- Elevated by: Pope Francis
- Date: 30 September 2023

Luis José Rueda Aparicio (born 3 March 1962) is a Colombian Catholic prelate who has served as Archbishop of Bogotá since 2020. He was previously Archbishop of Popayán from 2018 to 2020 and Bishop of Montelíbano from 2012 to 2018.

Pope Francis made him a cardinal on 30 September 2023.

== Biography ==
Luis José Rueda Aparicio was born in San Gil, Santander, on 3 March 1962, the tenth of eleven siblings. Before deciding to become a priest he worked in construction alongside his father and managed a laboratory in a cement factory. He studied philosophy in the major seminary of Socorro y San Gil and theology in the major seminary of Bucaramanga. He was ordained a priest of the Diocese of Socorro y San Gil on 23 November 1989. He earned a licentiate in moral theology at Rome's Alphonsian Academy. His pastoral assignments included parishes in Albania, Curití, Pinchote, Mogotes, and Barichara. He held several other positions in the administration of the diocese, taught at the seminary from 1994 to 1999, and became pastoral vicar of the diocese.

On 2 February 2012, Pope Benedict XVI named him Bishop of Montelíbano. He received his episcopal consecration on 14 April in the Cathedral de La Santa Cruz in San Gil from Aldo Cavalli, Apostolic Nuncio to Colombia, and was installed on 28 April. In July 2017 he was elected President of the Episcopal Commission for Social and Charitable Pastoral Care.

On 19 May 2018, Pope Francis appointed him Archbishop of Popayán. He was installed there on 7 July. He received his pallium, the symbol of his office as a metropolitan archbishop, from Pope Francis in St. Peter's Basilica on 29 June 2018. He dedicated the year 2020 as the archdiocese's "Year of Fraternity" to promote social solidarity and ecological conversion.

On 25 April 2020, Pope Francis appointed him Archbishop of Bogotá. He was installed there on 11 June.

He has been an outspoken supporter of the peace agreement of 2016 between the government of Colombia and the FARC rebels and protested against the assassination of social leaders.

On 9 July 2023, Pope Francis announced he plans to make him a cardinal at a consistory scheduled for 30 September. At that consistory he was made Cardinal-Priest of San Luca a Via Prenestina.

On 23 October 2024, the Synod of Bishops elected him a member of the Ordinary Council of the General Secretariat of the Synod.

He participated as a cardinal elector in the 2025 papal conclave that elected Pope Leo XIV.

Rueda is the Grand Prior of the Colombia Lieutenancy of the Equestrian Order of the Holy Sepulchre of Jerusalem.
