= Colegio Jordán de Sajonia =

- Latin: Schola Jordanus de Saxonia

Location
- Carrera 1 68-50; Bogotá, Distrito Capital; Colombia
- Coordinates: 4.64951°N 74.05252°W

Information
- Other name: Jordan of Saxony School
- Type: Private elementary, secondary, university-preparatory
- Motto: Latin: Stemus Simul; Spanish: De Pie Todos Juntos; (Everybody standing together)
- Religious affiliation: Catholicism
- Denomination: Dominican Order
- Patron saint: Blessed Jordan of Saxony
- Established: 1 February 1954; 72 years ago
- Founder: Friar Alberto E. Ariza, O.P.
- School district: Chapinero
- Principal: Friar Javier Antonio Castellanos, O.P.
- Gender: Co-educational
- Colors: White, black, and green
- Mascot: A Dog With A Burning Torch
- Website: jordandesajonia.edu.co

Colegio Jordán de Sajonia (English: Jordan of Saxony School; Latin: Schola Jordanus de Saxonia), is a private Catholic elementary, secondary and preparatory school located in Bogotá, D.C., Colombia. The bilingual school was founded on February 1, 1954 by Alberto E. Ariza, a Dominican Friar.

== Principals ==
1. 1954–1960: Rev. José de Jesús Sedano González, OP
2. 1961–1963: Rev. Luis Carlos Perea Sastoque, OP
3. 1964: Rev. Ismael Enrique Arévalo Claro, OP
4. 1965: Rev. Salvador Sánchez Toro, OP
5. 1966–1969: Rev. Domingo Abel Amaya, OP
6. 1970–1971: Rev. Adalberto Cardona Gómez, OP
7. 1972–1976: Rev. Jesús Antonio Ceballos Giraldo, OP
8. 1977–1979: Rev. Luis Carlos Perea Sastoque, OP
9. 1979–1982: Rev. José Antonio Balaguera Cepeda, OP
10. 1983–1986: Rev. Vicente Becerra Reyes, OP
11. 1987: Rev. Marco Antonio Peña Salinas, OP
12. 1987–1988: Rev. Jesús Antonio Ceballos Giraldo, OP
13. 1989–1991: Rev. Mauricio Galeano Rojas, OP
14. 1992–1993: Rev. Tiberio Polanía Ramírez, OP
15. 1994–1995: Rev. José Arturo Restrepo Restrepo, OP
16. 1995–1998: Rev. Mauricio Galeano Rojas, OP
17. 1998–2003: Rev. Rubén Darío López García, OP
18. 2003–2006: Rev. Jaime De Jesús Valencia García, OP
19. 2006–2007: Rev. Jaime Andrés Argüello Parra, OP
20. 2007–2011: Rev. Giovanni Humberto Guarnizo V, OP
21. 2012-2015: Rev. Oscar Guayan Perdomo, OP
22. 2015-2019: Rev. José Gabriel Mesa Angulo, OP
23. 2019-2021 : Rev. Edgar Aníbal Rueda Bueno, O.P.
24. 2021-2024 : Rev. Javier Antonio Castellanos, O.P.
25. 2024-2027 : Rev. Mauricio Galeano Rojas, O.P.

== See also ==
- Blessed Jordan of Saxony
- Dominican Order
- Saint Thomas Aquinas University
