= Diocese of Girardot =

Diocese of the Catholic Church in Colombia

Coordinates: 4.2975°N 74.8068°W

Diocese of Girardot Dioecesis Girardotensis

Catholic

Location
- Country: Colombia
- Ecclesiastical province: Bogotá

Statistics
- Area: 4,800 km^{2} (1,900 sq mi)
- Population: Total; Catholics: (as of 2006); 610,000; 485,000 (79.5%)

Information
- Rite: Latin Rite
- Established: 29 May 1956 (70 years ago)
- Cathedral: Catedral de La Inmaculado Corazón de María

Current leadership
- Pope: Leo XIV
- Bishop: Jaime Muñoz Pedroza
- Bishops emeritus: Rodrigo Escobar Aristizábal; Héctor Julio López Hurtado, S.D.B.

Map

The Roman Catholic Diocese of Girardot (Latin: Girardotensis) is a diocese located in the city of Girardot in the ecclesiastical province of Bogotá in Colombia.

== History ==
- 29 May 1956: Established as Diocese of Girardot from the Metropolitan Archdiocese of Bogotá

== Bishops ==
=== Ordinaries ===
- Alfredo Rubio Diaz (1956.05.29 – 1961.02.12), appointed Bishop of Sonsón
- Ciro Alfonso Gómez Serrano (1961.04.08 – 1972.07.24), appointed Coadjutor Bishop of Socorro y San Gil
- Jesús María Coronado Caro, S.D.B. (1973.02.10 – 1981.07.30), appointed Bishop of Duitama
- Rodrigo Escobar Aristizábal (1982.05.21 – 1987.09.17)
- Jorge Ardila Serrano (1988.05.21 – 2001.06.15)
- Héctor Julio López Hurtado, S.D.B. (2001.06.15 – 2018.07.11)
- Jaime Muñoz Pedroza (2018.07.11 – present)

=== Other priests of this diocese who became bishops ===
- Eulises González Sánchez, appointed Vicar Apostolic of San Andrés y Providencia in 2000
- Ismael Rueda Sierra, appointed Auxiliary Bishop of Cartagena in 2000

== See also ==
- Roman Catholicism in Colombia
