= Aspaen Gimnasio Iragua =

- Bogotá; Colombia

Information
- Type: Private primary and secondary school
- Religious affiliation: Catholicism
- Denomination: Opus Dei
- Established: 20 January 1968; 58 years ago
- Founder: ASPAEN
- Staff: 130
- Faculty: 65
- Grades: PreK-11
- Gender: Girls
- Colors: White, green and red
- Affiliation: International Baccalaureate Organization

Aspaen Gimnasio Iragua is a private Catholic primary and secondary school for girls, located in Bogotá, Colombia. The Opus Dei school was founded in 1968 by ASPAEN, a non-profit organization founded in 1964 as a project to promote education all over the country with 24 institutions in 8 cities of Colombia, related by their philosophy to other educational institutes in 5 continents.

== History ==
The school began working on January 20, 1969, with a staff of 7 teachers and 81 students. Today it has around 600 students, a staff of 65 teachers and a total of 130 employees. It has 18 grades, beginning with baby care to 12th grade. The socio-economic level of the alumni and their families are from high and medium-high classes. According to the information mentioned before the school divides itself in Kinabalu (babycare -transition), primary from grades 1st-6th, and secondary, that includes grades 7th, 8th, 9th, 10th, 11th and 12th.

The other institution which works in cooperation with Aspaen, is Corpaf -corporacion de padres de familia- born in 1968 and whose function is to provide the physical installations and logistics to the educational canters of Aspaen, being the economical support of the schools. on the other hand, it is also in charge of the families' growth process.

It is a bilingual school, and in 2007 it officially became a calendar b school. It has been affiliated to the International Baccalaureate Organization (IBO) since 1989, which gave the school the opportunity to open itself to other cultures, a better academic performance together with a better preparations of its staff in order to assume coherently its institutional philosophy. In 1991 the National Ministry of Education approved this educative innovation with the permission to give the title of International Bachelors in Sciences with the resolution 12609 of November 1991. In 1993 the first promotion of International Bachelors graduated, with a diploma expired by the IBO. It has also been qualified as a Very Superior Level school according to the Colombian state exam (ICFES).

== Seal ==
Iragua is an Indian (chibcha) word which means river channel, this supposes a dynamic movement of water, which flows from an origin to an end, through this road liberty is lived between the boundaries of responsibility in order to follow the natural law that will lead to form a better or more perfect person.

== Athletics and extracurricular activities ==
The students can enroll themselves into artistic and sports electives that include football, volleyball and cheers (viva colombia), as well as academic activities in which they have succeeded such as Model United Nations, Math Olympics, spelling bees and others. Hopefully someday the school will leave behind its misunderstandings and really support its students in activities with other schools.
