= Louis-Antoine-Rose Ormières Lacase =

French Roman Catholic priest

Blessed Louis-Antoine-Rose Ormières Lacase
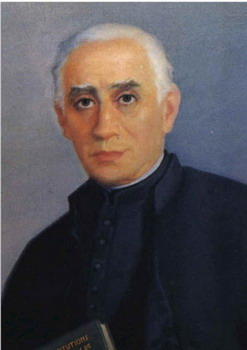

Priest
- Born: 14 July 1809; Quillan, Aude, First French Empire
- Died: 16 January 1890 (aged 80); Gijón, Asturias, Kingdom of Spain
- Venerated in: Roman Catholic Church
- Beatified: 22 April 2017, Oviedo Cathedral, Spain by Cardinal Angelo Amato
- Feast: 16 January
- Attributes: Priest's cassock
- Patronage: Sisters of the Guardian Angel

Louis-Antoine-Rose Ormières Lacase (14 July 1809 - 16 January 1890) was a French Roman Catholic priest from the Diocese of Carcassonne and the founder of the Sisters of the Guardian Angel - an order dedicated to the care of children and the educational needs of the poor.

Ormières became a Servant of God on 25 March 1954 under Pope Pius XII and was made Venerable on 8 March 1997 after Pope John Paul II confirmed his life of heroic virtue. Pope Francis recognized a miracle attributed to him in 2016 which confirmed his beatification; the celebration took place in Oviedo on 22 April 2017 with Cardinal Angelo Amato presiding on the pope's behalf.

== Life ==
Louis-Antoine-Rose Ormières Lacase was born in 1809 in Aude in France during a time of unease due to the French Revolution a decade prior to his birth. He was baptized a few hours after his birth at the local parish church. He was pleasant as a child and often joked around though sometimes had a look of uneasiness on his face.

He first attended school in his hometown and then attended a school in Limoux before deciding to commence his ecclesial studies in 1828 in Carcassonne. He commenced his studies for the diocesan priesthood in Carcassonne where he was ordained as such on 21 December 1833. He obtained a degree in education in Montpellier. His superiors at the time recognized that he had a flair for education and he himself believed he would become a diocesan teacher. This prompted his superior to name him as a professor to seminarians in Carcassonne.

Ormières established - on 3 December 1839 - a school that heralded in the establishment of the Sisters of the Guardian Angel. The school and order in and of themselves were established so that he could devote his pastoral mission to the education of children with a particular emphasis on a proper civic and cultural education that applied more to rural areas of France. Napoleon III issued a formal decree on 12 December 1852 that granted imperial recognition to Ormières' congregation that started its work in Ecuador on 4 December 1861. The institute received diocesan approval on 6 June 1837.

Ormières travelled to Rome where Pope Pius IX received him in a private audience on 16 July 1867. The pontiff blessed him and his work and provided him words of encouragement for the work of his congregation. He - at some point - relocated to Spain and remained in Oviedo for the remainder of his life.

He died in 1890 in Spain and his remains are now located in the order's motherhouse at Montauban. His order now operates in Africa and Asia. The order received the papal decree of praise from Pope Leo XIII on 27 August 1902 and received formal papal approval of its constitution from Pope Pius XI on 18 December 1934 and from Pope Pius XII on 11 May 1942.

== Beatification ==
The beatification process commenced in Oviedo in the introduction of a diocesan process on 25 March 1954 tasked with collecting information in relation to Ormières' life. This process concluded its work on 10 September 1955. The commencement of the cause in 1954 under Pope Pius XII granted Ormières the posthumous title of Servant of God as the first official stage in the process.

Theologians took possession of all of his writings in order to determine if such writings were orthodox in nature and not in contradiction of the faith - a decree issued on 12 July 1973 approved all of his spiritual writings. The Congregation for the Causes of Saints validated the diocesan process in Rome on 16 June 1989 and received the Positio in 1990 for assessment while a historical commission approved the contents of the dossier on 21 May 1991. Consulting theologians also approved the cause on 11 June 1996 while the C.C.S. came to the same conclusion on 7 January 1997.

Ormières was declared Venerable on 8 March 1997 after Pope John Paul II recognized that the late priest had lived a life of heroic virtue.

The process of investigating the miracle needed for his beatification took place in the area it originated in and received C.C.S. validation on 8 November 1996. But a medical board met on 8 April 1999 and did not vote in favor of the miracle. Another miracle uncovered witnessed another investigation that concluded on 3 October 2013 and received C.C.S. validation on 21 February 2014. Pope Francis approved the miracle on 8 July 2016 which also confirmed the beatification itself; the celebration was celebrated on 22 April 2017 in Oviedo rather than in his native France; Cardinal Angelo Amato presided on the pope's behalf.

The current postulator assigned to this cause is María del Carmen Trejo Delgado.
