= Catholic Church in Colombia =

Church provinces and diocese in Colombia

The Colombian Catholic Church, or Catholic Church in Colombia, is the branch of the Catholic Church in the South American nation of Colombia.

== Organization ==
It is organized into 13 ecclesiastical provinces, subdivided into 13 archdioceses and 52 dioceses, and a Maronite apostolic exarchate. Over 120 religious orders, institutes, and lay organizations run hundreds of primary and secondary schools, hospitals, clinics, orphanages, colleges, and 8 universities across the country. The best known are Pontificia Universidad Javeriana (in Bogotá) and Pontificia Universidad Javeriana (in Cali), both Jesuit universities.

Based on studies and a survey, about 90% of the Colombian population adheres to Christianity, the majority of which (70.9%) are Catholic, while 16.7% adhere to Protestantism (primarily Evangelicalism) or other Christian groups.

In 2020, almost 10,000 priests and over 12,000 nuns served over 4,500 parishes.

== History ==
Catholicism was introduced to the country in 1508. Two dioceses were organized in 1534. The Church grew significantly by the mid-17th century, in spite of the variety of indigenous languages, government interference and competition among religious orders. Some persecution followed the declaration of independence in 1819.

Throughout Latin America, the Church was subject to Spain and served its purposes throughout the colonial period and part of the nineteenth century. It was responsible for founding and directing schools for educating native elites (San Bartolomé, Universidad del Rosario, and the Universidad Santo Tomás), creating and sustaining hospitals, help from the colonial bureaucracy and generally, as an instrument of control and social cohesion.

In the late eighteenth century, the Bourbon reforms began to break down this scheme, especially with respect to education. For the first time the usefulness of the scholastic system used until then was questioned, and changes were sought.

At Independence, the clergy split between those who supported the king (royalists) and those who preferred absolute independence (nationalists). The high clergy (bishops and dignitaries) supported the former, while parish priests and many of the religious, supported the latter. The role played by the clergy in Independence was decisive, because it contributed to the mobilization and recruitment of fighters; they served as chaplains and military leaders.

With the 1991 Constitution of Colombia, the Colombian State became no longer Catholic. Equality and religious freedom were recognized.

On June 22, 2012, media in Colombia published the report titled "The Pope is concerned about the penetration of Pentecostals in Colombia" where religious pluralism merited serious consideration. The increasingly active presence of Pentecostal and Evangelical communities in many parts of Latin America were evident.

On October 31, 2012, Bishop Juan Vicente Córdoba, Secretary General of the Colombian Episcopal Conference, announced that the Catholic Church would seek parishioners in shopping centers, placing parishes in these commercial establishments. 4

Mariano de Jesus Euse Hoyos (the "father Marianito") and 7 religious of San Juan de Dios were beatified in 2000, while Mother Laura Montoya, founder of the Missionaries of Mary Immaculate and St. Catherine of Siena ("Lauritas"), was canonized.

In November 2023, a book by Colombian journalists Juan Pablo Barrientos and Miguel Ángel Estupiñán which detailed an investigation into sex abuse claims against the Catholic Church in Colombia, titled El archivio secreto, was published which named at least 569 Catholic clergy in Colombia who were accused of committing acts of sex abuse. In July 2024, Pope Francis accepted the resignation of accused Colombian Bishop Óscar Augusto Múnera Ocha, who was first accused of committing acts of sex abuse in May 2024, as apostolic vicar of Tierradento.

== Influence ==
Catholicism wielded a strong influence on public opinion and government affairs. The Church influences various fields and institutions, including:

- Military and Police -The Bishopric of Colombia Castrense serves exclusively as staff diocese to active and retired staff and family members of the Colombian Armed Forces and the National Police.
- The Apostolic Nunciature - the embassy of the Holy See in the country.
- The faithful - representing about 90% of the population.
- Churches - land acquisition and construction
- The Concordat with the Holy See came into force in 1886; the Constitutional Court enforced some of its provisions in 1993. The Colombian Bishops' Conference spoke against it two weeks later.

== See also ==
- Christianity in Colombia
- Religion in Colombia
- List of Catholic dioceses in Colombia
- List of South American saints
- Pan-Amazonian Ecclesial Network (REPAM)
