= Diocese of Ipiales =

Latin Catholic ecclesiastical territory in Colombia

Coordinates: 0.8235°N 77.6346°W

Diocese of Ipiales Dioecesis Ipialensis

Catholic

Location
- Country: Colombia
- Ecclesiastical province: Popayán

Statistics
- Area: 11,000 km^{2} (4,200 sq mi)
- Population: Total; Catholics: (as of 2023); 676,520; 610,430 (90.2%)

Information
- Denomination: Catholic Church
- Sui iuris church: Latin Church
- Rite: Roman Rite
- Established: 23 September 1964 (62 years ago)
- Cathedral: Catedral de San Pedro Mártir

Current leadership
- Pope: Leo XIV
- Bishop: José Saúl Grisales Grisales

Map

Website
- www.diocesisdeipiales.org.co

The Diocese of Ipiales (Latin: Ipialensis) is a Latin Church ecclesiastical territory or diocese of the Catholic Church in Southern Colombia. It is a suffragan diocese in the ecclesiastical province of the metropolitan Archdiocese of Popayán.

== History ==
- Established on 23 September 1964 as Diocese of Ipiales, on territory split off from the Diocese of Pasto

== Statistics ==
As per 2015, it pastorally served 560,288 Catholics (90.2% of 620,969 total) on 11,089 km^{2} in 45 parishes and 2 missions with 95 priests (87 diocesan, 8 religious), 2 deacons, 86 lay religious (16 brothers, 70 sisters) and 37 seminarians.

== Special churches ==
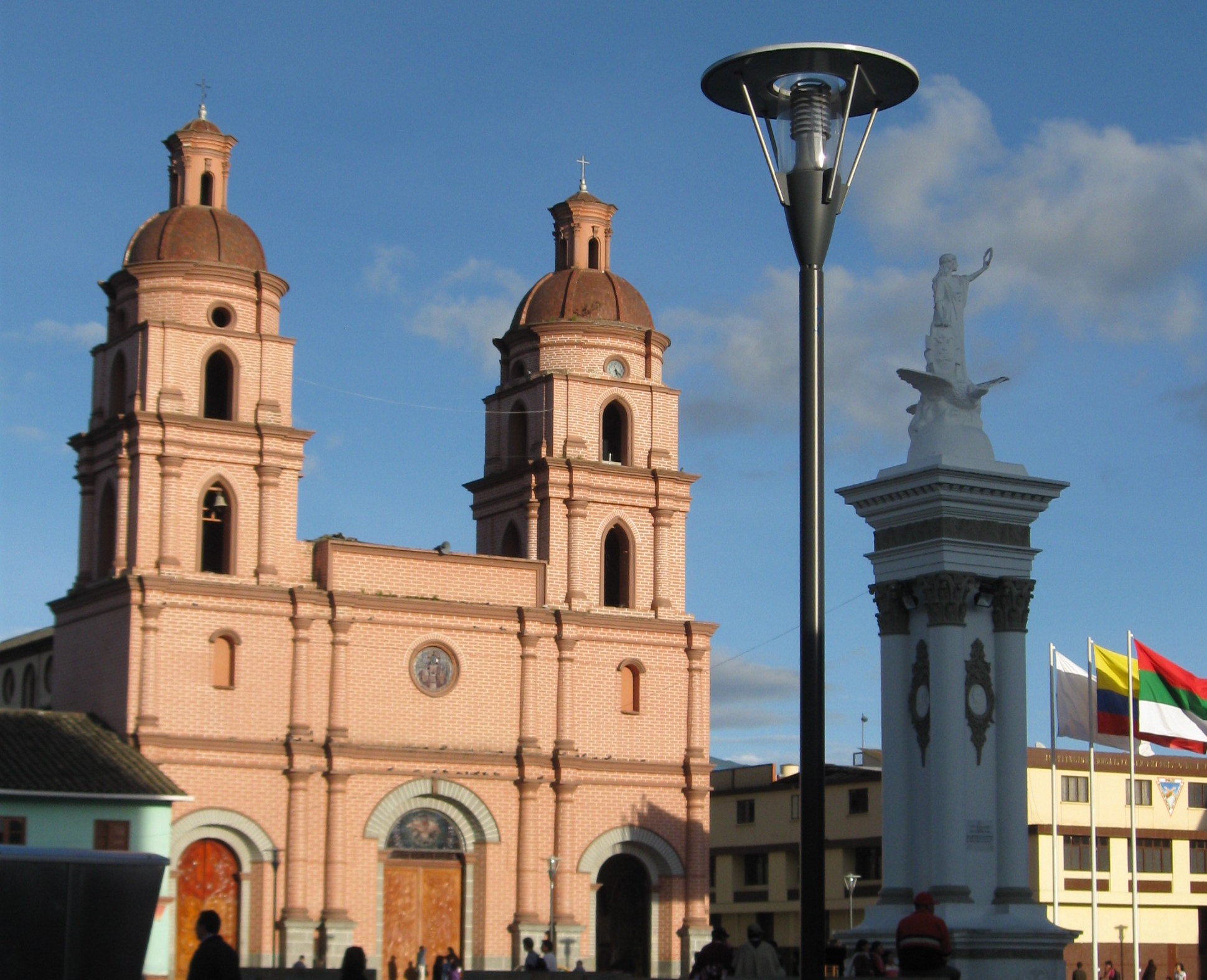
Cathedral of St. Peter Martyr

- Its cathedral is the Catedral de San Pedro Mártir, dedicated to the martyr Peter of Verona, in the episcopal see of Ipiales in Nariño Department, near the border with Ecuador
- It also has a Minor Basilica : Basílica Santuario de Nuestra Señora de Las Lajas, dedicated to Our Lady, in Ipiales, in the same department.

== Episcopal Ordinaries ==
(all native Colombians)

- Miguel Angel Arce Vivas (31 Oct 1964 – 7 April 1965), next Metropolitan Archbishop of Popayán (Colombia) (1965.04.07 – 1976.10.11), died 1987
- Alfonso Arteaga Yepes (24 July 1965 – 25 Oct 1985), next Bishop of Espinal (Colombia) (1985 – death 1989.10.30); previously Titular Bishop of Auzegera (1962.09.12 – 1965.07.24) as Auxiliary Bishop of Popayán (1962.09.12 – 1965.07.24)
- Ramón Mantilla Duarte, Redemptorists (C.Ss.R.) (25 Oct 1985 – retired 16 Jan 1987), died 2009; previously Titular Bishop of Sala Consilina (1971.01.16 – 1977.04.26) as Vicar Apostolic of Sibundoy (Colombia; see later Promoted as Diocese of Mocoa–Sibundoy) (1971.01.16 – 1977.04.26), Bishop of Garzón (Colombia) (1977.04.26 – 1985.10.25)
- Gustavo Martínez Frías (16 Jan 1987 – 18 March 1999), next Metropolitan Archbishop of Nueva Pamplona (Colombia) (1999.03.18 – death 2009.08.29)
- Arturo de Jesús Correa Toro (29 Jan 2000 – retired 3 February 2018)
- José Saúl Grisales Grisales (3 February 2018 – ...), no previous prelature.

== See also ==
- List of Catholic dioceses in Colombia
- Roman Catholicism in Colombia

== Sources and External links ==
- Diocese of Ipiales at Catholic-Hierarchy.org
- GCatholic.org, with Google map & HQ satellite photo - data for all sections
- diocesan website (in Spanish)
