= Fabián Marulanda López =

Colombian Roman Catholic bishop (born 1933)

The Most Reverend Fabián Marulanda López
- Bishop Emeritus of Florencia
- Church: Catholic Church
- Diocese: Florencia
- See: Florencia
- Appointed: 22 December 1989
- Term ended: 19 July 2002
- Predecessor: José Luis Serna Alzate
- Successor: Jorge Alberto Ossa Soto
- Other posts: Titular Bishop of Pederodiana (1986–1989); Auxiliary Bishop of Ibagué (1986–1989)

Orders
- Ordination: 20 November 1960
- Consecration: 15 August 1986 by José Joaquín Flórez Hernández

Personal details
- Born: 27 December 1933 (age 92) Marulanda, Caldas, Colombia
- Education: Pontifical Catholic University of Chile, Pontificia Universidad Javeriana, Catholic University of Paris

Fabián Marulanda López (born 27 December 1933) is a Colombian Roman Catholic prelate who served as Bishop of Florencia from 1989 until his resignation in 2002. He was previously an auxiliary bishop of the Archdiocese of Ibagué and titular bishop of Pederodiana from 1986 until 1989.

== Early life and priesthood ==
Marulanda was born in Marulanda, Caldas, on 27 December 1933. He studied secondary education, philosophy and theology at the Seminary of Ibagué. He subsequently undertook specialized studies in catechesis and pastoral ministry at the Catechetical Institute of the Catholic University of Santiago de Chile, the Pontificia Universidad Javeriana in Bogotá, and the Catholic University of Paris. He also studied pastoral sociology at the CISIC in Rome.

He was ordained a priest for the Archdiocese of Ibagué on 20 November 1960. During his priestly ministry he served as diocesan director of pastoral ministry and catechesis, parish priest of San José Obrero in Ibagué, professor at Colegio Tolimense and at the Major Seminary of Ibagué, founder and first parish priest of the parish of San Judas Tadeo in Ibagué, and episcopal vicar for pastoral ministry.

Following the Armero tragedy of November 1985, Marulanda served as episcopal vicar responsible for pastoral needs in northern Tolima. In an account published by the Colombian Episcopal Conference, Marulanda recalled that he represented the archbishop of Ibagué at a meeting concerning Pope John Paul II's 1986 visit to Colombia and successfully requested that a visit to survivors of the Armero disaster be added to the papal itinerary.

== Episcopate ==
On 15 July 1986, Pope John Paul II appointed Marulanda titular bishop of Pederodiana and auxiliary bishop of Ibagué. The appointment was recorded in the Acta Apostolicae Sedis, which described him as episcopal vicar of the Archdiocese of Ibagué. He was consecrated a bishop on 15 August 1986.

On 22 December 1989, John Paul II appointed him Bishop of Florencia, succeeding José Luis Serna Alzate. The appointment was published in the 1990 volume of the Acta Apostolicae Sedis. He served as bishop of Florencia from 1990 until 2002.

During his episcopate in Florencia, Marulanda organized the Encuentro Matrimonial movement in the city, founded a Center for Family Pastoral Ministry, obtained new transmission equipment for the diocesan radio station, established a communications office, and ordained the first permanent deacons in the diocese.

== Later ministry ==
On 19 July 2002, Pope John Paul II accepted Marulanda's resignation from the pastoral government of the Diocese of Florencia in accordance with Canon 401 §2 of the 1983 Code of Canon Law. The Colombian Episcopal Conference states that he assumed the position of secretary general of the Colombian episcopate following his resignation as bishop.

Marulanda served as secretary general of the Colombian Episcopal Conference from 2002 until 2009. He was re-elected for the 2005–2008 triennium and again for 2008–2011, but resigned from the position in July 2009, with the plenary assembly accepting his resignation. In 2011, he was appointed alternate representative of the Colombian Episcopal Conference on the board of directors of the National Learning Service (SENA).
