= Grisales =

Grisales is a surname. Notable people with the surname include:

- Amparo Grisales (born 1956), Colombian actress
- Carlos Grisales (born 1966), Colombian long-distance runner
- Fabio de Jesús Morales Grisales (1934–2025), Colombian Roman Catholic prelate
- Freddy Grisales (born 1975), Colombian football player
