= Luis Alberto Parra Mora =

Colombian Roman Catholic bishop (1944–2023)

His Excellency Luis Alberto Parra Mora
- Bishop Emeritus of Mocoa-Sibundoy
- Metropolis: Popayán
- Appointed: 18 October 2003
- Term ended: 1 December 2014
- Predecessor: Fabio de Jesús Morales Grisales
- Successor: Luis Albeiro Maldonado Monsalve

Orders
- Ordination: 9 October 1971
- Consecration: 11 December 2003 by Beniamino Stella

Personal details
- Born: 22 March 1944 Tenza, Colombia
- Died: 8 August 2023 (aged 79) Bogotá, Colombia
- Motto: ID Y EVANGELIZAD
- Coat of arms

Styles of Luis Alberto Parra Mora
- Reference style: His Excellency; The Most Reverend
- Spoken style: Your Excellency
- Religious style: Bishop

Luis Alberto Parra Mora (22 March 1944 – 8 August 2023) was a Colombian Roman Catholic prelate. He was bishop of Mocoa–Sibundoy from 2003 to 2014.

Catholic Church titles
Preceded by Fabio de Jesús Morales Grisales	Bishop of Mocoa-Sibundoy; 2003–2014	Succeeded by Luis Albeiro Maldonado Monsalve
