= Cuniberti =

Cuniberti is the name of:

- Pirro Cuniberti (1923–2016), prominent figure in post-Worldwar II Italian art
- Vittorio Cuniberti (1854–1913), Italian military officer
- Angelo Cuniberti (1921–2012), Italian Prelate of the Roman Catholic Church
- Gianaurelio Cuniberti (born 1970), Italian academic scientist
