= José de Jesús Pimiento Rodríguez =

Colombian Catholic bishop (1919–2019)

His Eminence José de Jesús Pimiento Rodríguez
- Archbishop Emeritus of Manizales
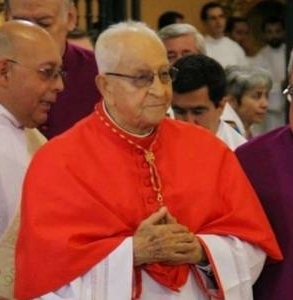
- Church: Roman Catholic Church
- Archdiocese: Manizales
- Appointed: 22 May 1975
- Term ended: 15 October 1996
- Predecessor: Arturo Duque Villegas
- Successor: Fabio Betancur Tirado
- Other post: Cardinal Priest of San Giovanni Crisostomo a Monte Sacro Alto (2015–2019)
- Previous posts: Auxiliary Bishop of Pasto (1955–1959); Titular Bishop of Apollonis (1955–1959); Bishop of Montería (1959–1964); Bishop of Garzón-Neiva (1964–1975); President of the Colombian Bishops' Conference (1972–1978)

Orders
- Ordination: 14 December 1941 by Ismael Perdomo Borrero
- Consecration: 28 August 1955 by Crisanto Luque Sánchez
- Created cardinal: 14 February 2015 by Pope Francis
- Rank: Cardinal priest

Personal details
- Born: José de Jesús Horacio Pimiento Rodríguez; 18 February 1919 Zapatoca, Colombia
- Died: 3 September 2019 (aged 100) Floridablanca, Colombia
- Motto: Vivere Christus est (To live is Christ, Philippians 1:21)

Ordination history of José de Jesús Pimiento Rodríguez
History
Priestly ordination
- Ordained by: Ismael Perdomo Borrero
Episcopal consecration
- Principal consecrator: Crisanto Luque Sánchez
- Co-consecrators: Emilio Botero González; Pedro José Rivera Mejía
Cardinalate
- Elevated by: Pope Francis
Episcopal succession
Bishops consecrated by José de Jesús Pimiento Rodríguez as principal consecrator
- Rodrigo Escobar Aristizábal: 14 August 1982
- José Miguel Gómez Rodríguez: 5 February 2005

Styles of José de Jesús Pimiento Rodríguez
- Reference style: His Eminence
- Spoken style: Your Eminence
- Religious style: Cardinal
- Informal style: Cardinal

José de Jesús Horacio Pimiento Rodríguez (Spanish pronunciation: [xoˈse ðe xeˈsus piˈmjento roˈðɾiɣes]; 18 February 1919 – 3 September 2019) was a Colombian prelate of the Catholic Church who served as Bishop of Montería from 1959 to 1964, Bishop of Garzón-Neiva from 1964 to 1975, and finally Archbishop of Manizales from 1975 to 1996. He was created a cardinal by Pope Francis in 2015.

== Life and career ==
Pimiento Rodríguez was born in Zapatoca to Agustín Pimiento Lizarazo and Salomé Rodríguez Castillo. He was baptized on 4 March 1919. He was ordained a priest on 14 December 1941, fulfilling his dream despite his family's economic hardship. Pimiento served as coadjutor vicar in parishes in Mogotes, as well as in the cathedrals of San Gil and Vélez.

He was appointed an auxiliary bishop of the Diocese of Pasto, as well as titular bishop of Apollonis, by Pope Pius XII on 14 June 1955, and consecrated on 28 August 1955. On 30 December 1959, Pope John XXIII appointed Pimiento bishop of the Diocese of Monteria and later by Pope Paul VI as bishop of the Diocese of Garzón-Neiva on 29 February 1964. He participated in the Second Vatican Council from 1962 to 1965, and served as President of the Episcopal Conference of Colombia from 1972 to 1978.

His final appointment was on 22 May 1975, as Archbishop of Manizales, where he emphasised the implementation of Council decrees, such as in the pastoral care of family and youth, as well as updating the process of priestly formation in the archdiocese, including by restructuring the minor seminary to become the archdiocesan major seminary. Pimiento also oversaw the restoration of the cathedral of Manizales's bell towers, which were damaged in an earthquake in 1979. After the Nevado del Ruiz volcano erupted in 1985, he helped shelter hundreds of people fleeing other cities in the region. He retired on 15 October 1996 and later resumed work as a parish priest.

== Cardinal ==
On 4 January 2015, Pope Francis announced that he would make him a cardinal on 14 February of the same year, four days short of his 96th birthday. Pimiento was described by those who knew him as "imbued with the spirit of the Second Vatican Council". He did not travel to the consistory due to his advanced age; arrangements were made for him to receive his biretta and ring from fellow Colombian cardinal Rubén Salazar Gómez in Bogotá. He was assigned the titular church of San Giovanni Crisostomo a Monte Sacro Alto.

== Death ==
Pimiento Rodríguez died from heart failure during the afternoon on 3 September 2019 at a retreat house in Floridablanca, near Bucaramanga. He had recently been hospitalized after a fall and released. At the time of his death he had been the oldest member of the College of Cardinals since the death of Loris Francesco Capovilla in 2016.

Catholic Church titles
Preceded by Rubén Isaza Restrepo	Bishop of Monteria; 1959–1964	Succeeded by Miguel Antonio Medina y Medina
Preceded by Gerardo Martinez Madrigal	Bishop of Garzon-Neiva; 1964–1975	Succeeded by Octavio Betancourt Arango
Preceded by Arturo Duque Villegas	Archbishop of Manizales; 1964–1996	Succeeded by Fabio Betancur Tirado
Preceded by Bernard Agre	Cardinal Priest of San Giovanni Crisostomo a Monte Sacro Alto; 2015–2019	Succeeded by Jean-Claude Hollerich
Records
Preceded by Loris Francesco Capovilla	Oldest living Member of the Sacred College; 26 May 2016 – 3 September 2019	Succeeded by Roger Etchegaray
