= Octavio Betancourt Arango =

Colombian Catholic prelate

- Diocesan Bishop of Diocese of Garzón
- Church: Roman Catholic Church
- Appointed: 10 November 1975
- Term ended: 26 April 1977
- Predecessor: José de Jesús Pimiento Rodríguez
- Successor: Ramón Mantilla Duarte
- Other post: Titular Bishop of Germania in Dacia (1970–1975)

Orders
- Ordination: 1 November 1951 (Priest) by Joaquín García Benítez
- Consecration: 2 February 1971 (Bishop) by Tulio Botero

Personal details
- Born: Octavio Betancourt Arango; 4 January 1928 Abejorral, Colombia
- Died: 18 June 2017 (aged 89) Medellín, Colombia

Octavio Betancourt Arango (4 January 1928 – 18 June 2017) was a Colombian Catholic prelate. He served as an auxiliary bishop of the Archdiocese of Medellín from 23 November 1970, until 10 November 1975, and a bishop of the Diocese of Garzón from 10 November 1975, until 26 April 1977.

== Life ==
He was born on 4 January 1928, in the municipality of Abejorral, Antioquia, his parents were Vicente Betancourt and María Arango. He studied at the Universidad Pontificia Bolivariana until he obtained a bachelor's degree in 1945. In 1946 he entered the Medellín Major Seminary and after he was ordained a priest by Monsignor Joaquín García Benítez on 1 November 1951.

He was cooperating vicar in Caldas and Titiribí. In August 1953 traveled to Rome to study and obtained the degree of Canon Law in the Pontifical Lateran University. He returned to Colombia in late 1956. He was Vice-Chancellor, professor of the Seminary, chaplain of the Servants of the Blessed Sacrament and Chancellor.

In November 1962 he was appointed secretary of the Colombian Episcopate in Bogotá, where he returned in July 1966. He was then designated as the spiritual father of the seminary. In May 1968 was appointed Chancellor and in September 1969 Vicar General.

On 23 November 1970, he was appointed titular bishop of Germania in Dacia and an auxiliary bishop of the Archdiocese of Medellín. He received the episcopal consecration on 2 February 1971, from the hands of Monsignor Tulio Botero in the Metropolitan Cathedral of Medellín.

On 10 November 1975, he was appointed Bishop of the Diocese of Garzón, where he remained until April 1977 when he resigned for health reasons. Since July 1977 he has been linked to the Regional Ecclesiastical Court of Medellin.

Catholic Church titles
Preceded by José de Jesús Pimiento Rodríguez	Bishop of Garzón; 1975–1977	Succeeded by Ramón Mantilla Duarte
