= Arturo de Jesús Correa Toro =

Colombian catholic priest (1941–2021)

- Bishop of Ipiales
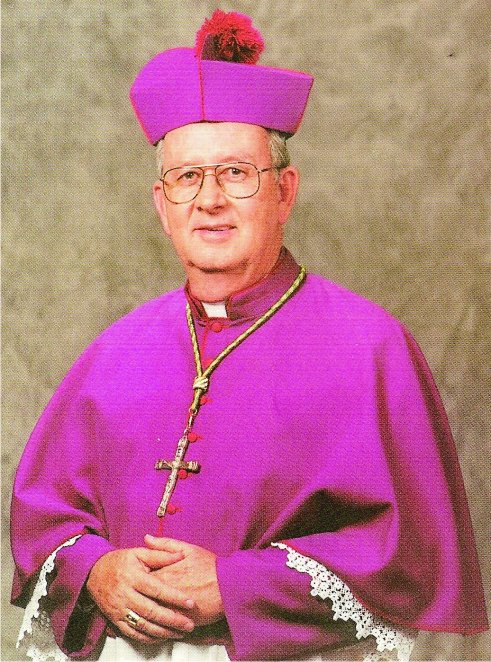
- Church: Catholic Church
- Diocese: Diocese of Ipiales
- In office: 29 January 2000 – 3 February 2018
- Predecessor: Gustavo Martínez Frías
- Successor: José Saúl Grisales Grisales

Orders
- Ordination: 22 October 1967
- Consecration: 20 March 2000 by Augusto Aristizábal Ospina

Personal details
- Born: 26 April 1941 Ituango, Antioquia Department, Colombia
- Died: 26 May 2021 (aged 80) Pasto, Nariño Department, Colombia

Arthur de Jesús Correa Toro (26 April 1941 – 26 May 2021) was a Colombian Roman Catholic bishop.

== Biography ==
Correa Toro was born in Ituango, Colombia and was ordained to the priesthood in 1967. He served as bishop of the Roman Catholic Diocese of Ipiales, Colombia from 2000 until 2018.

Correa Toro died from complications of COVID-19 during the COVID-19 pandemic in Colombia on 26 May 2021, at age 80 in Pasto, Colombia.
