= Esteban Rojas Tovar =

Colombian educator, philanthropist

Esteban Rojas Tovar (15 January 1859 – 28 July 1933) was a Colombian educator, philanthropist and, from 1900 to 1922, bishop of the diocese of Garzón in the department of Huila in Colombia.

He was born in El Hato (Tarqui, Huila).

After studying philosophy and theology he was ordained as a priest and rose rapidly through the Colombian ecclesiastical hierarchy. This was due in a large part to his organisational and leadership skills. As a priest he was well known for pastoral and missionary work, his integrity and his austere lifestyle. He founded many colleges in Huila and Tolima as well as the Council Seminary of Garzón and the Mesa de Elías Seminary. Bishop Rojas Tovar worked tirelessly and most of the public works that benefited the department of Huila were carried out thanks to his intervention.

He was Bishop of Tolima, Colombia, from 1895 to 1900, when he became Bishop of Garzón, Colombia. He was appointed Titular Bishop of Modra in 1922.
