= Our Lady of the Rosary of Chiquinquirá Cathedral (Santa Rosa de Osos) =

- Catedral Nuestra Señora del Rosario de Chiquinquirá
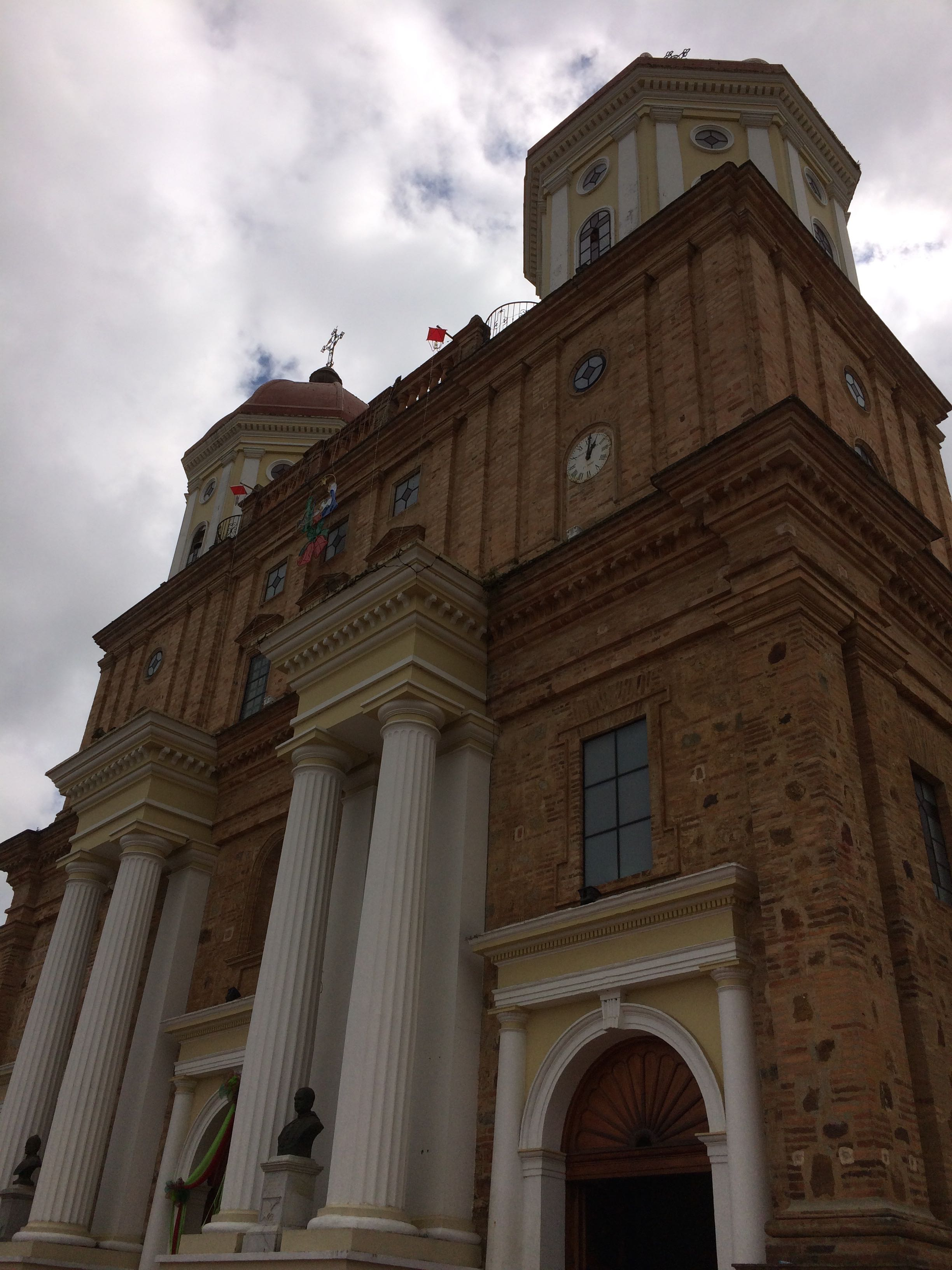
- Our Lady of the Rosary of Chiquinquirá Cathedral
- Location: Santa Rosa de Osos
- Country: Colombia
- Denomination: Roman Catholic Church

Administration
- Diocese: Roman Catholic Diocese of Santa Rosa de Osos

The Our Lady of the Rosary of Chiquinquirá Cathedral (Spanish: Catedral Nuestra Señora del Rosario de Chiquinquirá), also Santa Rosa de Osos Cathedral, is a cathedral church of Catholic worship dedicated to the Virgin Mary under the invocation of Our Lady of the Rosary of Chiquinquirá. It is located in the central zone of the city of Santa Rosa de Osos in the South American country of Colombia, to the south side of the Bolivar Park (Main Park).

The cathedral is the main church building of the Diocese of Santa Rosa de Osos, the seat of the Catholic Bishop. Likewise, it is the seat of the "Parish of the Cathedral". In 1917, Pope Benedict XV raised it to that rank when the Diocese was created.

== See also ==
- List of cathedrals in Colombia
- Our Lady of the Rosary of Chiquinquirá
- Roman Catholicism in Colombia
