= Omar Mejía Giraldo =

Colombian Roman Catholic archbishop (born 1966)

His Excellency Omar de Jesús Mejía Giraldo
- Archbishop of Florencia
- Church: Catholic Church
- Archdiocese: Florencia
- Appointed: 13 July 2019
- Predecessor: Diocese elevated to an archdiocese
- Previous post: Bishop of Florencia (2013–2019)

Orders
- Ordination: 16 November 1991
- Consecration: 29 June 2013 by Fidel León Cadavid Marín

Personal details
- Born: 21 January 1966 (age 60) El Santuario, Antioquia, Colombia
- Education: Universidad Católica de Oriente, Pontifical Gregorian University
- Motto: Fiat Voluntas Tua
- Coat of arms

Omar de Jesús Mejía Giraldo (born 21 January 1966) is a Colombian Roman Catholic prelate who has served as Archbishop of Florencia since 2019. He was previously Bishop of Florencia from 2013 until the diocese was elevated to an archdiocese. He also served as apostolic administrator of the Diocese of San Vicente del Caguán from 2021 to 2024.

== Early life and education ==
Omar de Jesús Mejía Giraldo was born in El Santuario, in the Antioquia Department of Colombia, on 21 January 1966. He studied philosophy and theology at the Cristo Sacerdote National Major Seminary in La Ceja. He subsequently obtained a licentiate in philosophy and religious sciences from the Universidad Católica de Oriente in Rionegro and a licentiate in dogmatic theology from the Pontifical Gregorian University in Rome.

== Priesthood ==
Mejía Giraldo was ordained a priest for the clergy of the Diocese of Sonsón-Rionegro on 16 November 1991. His early pastoral assignments included serving as a formator at the Nuestra Señora diocesan seminary, diocesan delegate for youth and vocational pastoral ministry, parish vicar at Nuestra Señora del Carmen in El Carmen de Viboral, and director of the pastoral department at the Universidad Católica de Oriente. He also served as parish vicar at Madre de la Sabiduría and as vice-rector and later rector of the Cristo Sacerdote National Seminary in La Ceja. He became rector in 2008.

== Episcopate ==
=== Bishop of Florencia ===
On 27 April 2013, Pope Francis appointed Mejía Giraldo Bishop of Florencia, succeeding the vacant see. At the time of his appointment he was rector of the Cristo Sacerdote National Major Seminary in La Ceja.

He received episcopal consecration on 29 June 2013. His principal consecrator was Fidel León Cadavid Marín, Bishop of Sonsón-Rionegro, with Ricardo Antonio Tobón Restrepo, Archbishop of Medellín, and Flavio Calle Zapata, Archbishop of Ibagué, serving as principal co-consecrators. He took canonical possession of the Diocese of Florencia in July 2013.

=== Archbishop of Florencia ===
On 13 July 2019, Pope Francis established the Archdiocese of Florencia, elevating the Diocese of Florencia to a metropolitan archdiocese and appointing Mejía Giraldo as its first metropolitan archbishop. The new province included the dioceses of Mocoa-Sibundoy and San Vicente del Caguán as suffragan dioceses.

The Episcopal Conference of Colombia records his episcopal ordination as 29 June 2013 and his appointment as archbishop in 2019. It states that the canonical inauguration of the elevated archdiocese took place in September 2019, with Mejía Giraldo taking canonical possession of the metropolitan see on 19 September.

=== Apostolic administrator of San Vicente del Caguán ===
Following the appointment of Francisco Javier Múnera Correa as Archbishop of Cartagena in 2021, Mejía Giraldo additionally served as apostolic administrator of the Diocese of San Vicente del Caguán from May 2021 until 2 October 2024. The Episcopal Conference of Colombia records that he assumed the administration of the diocese in May 2021 and that his administration ended when William Prieto Daza took canonical possession of the see on 2 October 2024.
