= Diocese of San Vicente del Caguán =

Catholic missionary jurisdiction in Colombia

Diocese of San Vicente del Caguán Diocesis Sancti Vincentii a Caguan

Catholic
- Cathedral of Our Lady of Mercy

Location
- Country: Colombia
- Territory: San Vicente del Caguán
- Ecclesiastical province: Florencia

Statistics
- Area: 38,000 km^{2} (15,000 sq mi)
- Population: Total; Catholics: (as of 2018); 113,530; 93,000 (81.9%)
- Parishes: 14

Information
- Denomination: Catholic Church
- Sui iuris church: Latin Church
- Rite: Roman Rite
- Established: 9 December 1985 (40 years ago)
- Cathedral: Catedral Nuestra Señora de las Mercedes
- Secular priests: 20

Current leadership
- Pope: Leo XIV
- Bishop: William Prieto Daza
- Metropolitan Archbishop: Omar de Jesús Mejía Giraldo

The Diocese of San Vicente del Caguán, shortened to the Diocese of San Vicente (Latin: Diocesis Sancti Vincentii a Caguan), is a Latin Church ecclesiastical territory or diocese of the Catholic Church in Colombia. It is a suffragan diocese in the ecclesiastical province of the metropolitan Archdiocese of Florencia.

The diocesan cathedra, the Catedral Nuestra Señora de las Mercedes, is located in the episcopal see of San Vicente del Caguán in Caqueta Department.

== History ==
On 9 December 1985, pope John Paul II established the Apostolic Vicariate of San Vicente-Puerto Leguízamo from the Apostolic Vicariate of Florencia (now a bishopric).

Pope Benedict XVI split the vicariate in two on 21 February 2013, creating the Apostolic Vicariate of San Vicente del Caguán and the Apostolic Vicariate of Puerto Leguízamo-Solano.

On 30 May 2019 Pope Francis elevated this Apostolic Vicariate in the rank of Diocese. On 13 July 2019 the newly created diocese changed province from Ibagué to Florencia.

== Ordinaries ==
Apostolic Vicars

- Luis Augusto Castro Quiroga, I.M.C. (17 Oct 1986 – 2 Feb 1998), appointed Archbishop of Tunja
- Francisco Javier Múnera Correa, I.M.C. (28 Nov 1998 – 30 May 2019), appointed Bishop

Diocesan Bishops of San Vicente del Caguán

- Francisco Javier Múnera Correa, I.M.C. (30 May 2019 – 25 Mar 2021)
  - Sede Vacante; Apostolic Administrator: Omar de Jesús Mejía Giraldo (2021 – 2 Oct 2024), Archbishop of Florencia
- William Prieto Daza (5 Jul 2024 – Present)

== See also ==
- Roman Catholicism in Colombia
