= José Luis Serna Alzate =

José Luis Serna Alzate I.M.C.
- Bishop of Líbano–Honda
- Church: Catholic Church
- Diocese: Diocese of Líbano–Honda
- In office: 8 July 1989 – 12 July 2002
- Predecessor: Diocese erected
- Successor: Rafael Arcadio Bernal Supelano
- Previous posts: Bishop of Florencia (1985-1989); Titular Bishop of Cartennae (1978-1985); Vicar Apostolic of Florencia (1978-1985)

Orders
- Ordination: 23 December 1961
- Consecration: 7 December 1978 by Agnelo Rossi

Personal details
- Born: 17 February 1936 Arantzazu, Biscay, Spanish Republic
- Died: 28 September 2014 (aged 78)

José Luis Serna Alzate (17 February 1936 – 28 September 2014) was a Catholic Church bishop.

Born in the Spanish town of Aranzazu on 17 February 1936, José Luis Serna Alzate was ordained a Catholic priest on 23 December 1961. On 15 November 1978, Serna Alzate was appointed as both the vicar apostolic of Florencia, Caquetá in Colombia, as well as the titular bishop of Cartennae. His next appointments were as bishop of Florencia on 9 December 1985, and then as bishop of the Roman Catholic Diocese of Líbano–Honda in the Tolima Department of Colombia. Serna Alzate resigned on 12 July 2002, and died twelve years later on 28 September 2014.
