= Luis Albeiro Maldonado Monsalve =

Colombian Roman Catholic bishop (born 1958)

The Most Reverend Luis Albeiro Maldonado Monsalve
- Bishop of Santa Rosa de Osos
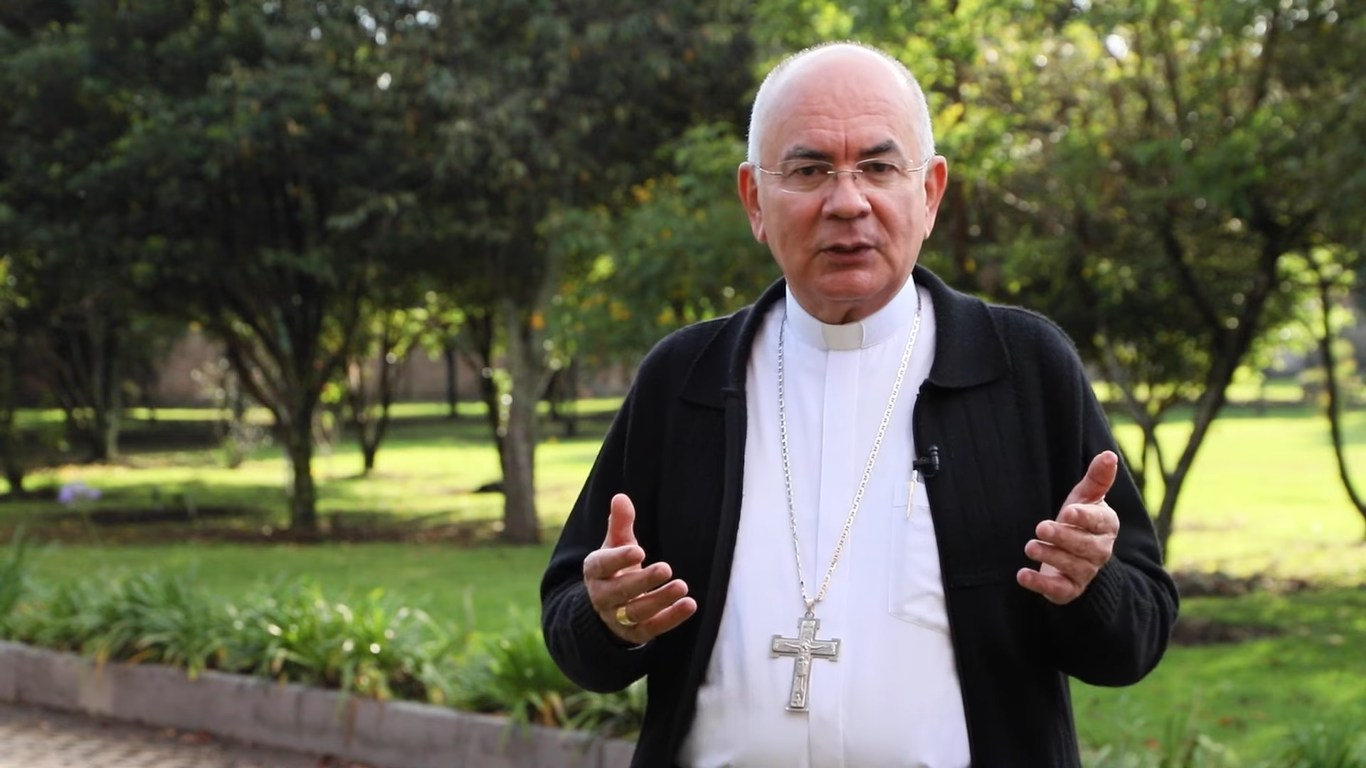
- Church: Catholic Church
- Archdiocese: Santa Fe de Antioquia
- Diocese: Santa Rosa de Osos
- Appointed: 10 April 2025
- Installed: 29 May 2025
- Predecessor: Elkin Fernando Álvarez Botero
- Previous post: Bishop of bishop of Mocoa-Sibundoy (2015–2025)

Orders
- Ordination: 5 July 1986 by Pope John Paul II
- Consecration: 3 December 2015 by Ricardo Antonio Tobón Restrepo

Personal details
- Born: Luis Albeiro Maldonado Monsalve; 20 January 1958 (age 68) Fredonia, Antioquia, Colombia
- Education: Pontifical Bolivarian University; Pontifical Gregorian University
- Motto: Omnia Christus Est Nobis
- Coat of arms

Luis Albeiro Maldonado Monsalve (born 20 January 1958) is a Colombian Roman Catholic prelate who has served as bishop of Santa Rosa de Osos since 2025. He previously served as bishop of Mocoa-Sibundoy from 2015 to 2025.

== Early life and education ==
Luis Albeiro Maldonado Monsalve was born in Fredonia, Antioquia, in the Diocese of Caldas, on 20 January 1958, to Luis Carlos Maldonado and Mercedes Monsalve. He was one of ten children. He completed his primary and secondary education in Fredonia before entering the Major Seminary of Medellín. He studied philosophy and theology at the Pontifical Bolivarian University in Medellín and later obtained a licentiate in spiritual theology from the Pontifical Gregorian University in Rome.

== Priesthood ==
Maldonado Monsalve was ordained a priest on 5 July 1986 by Pope John Paul II in Medellín and was incardinated into the Archdiocese of Medellín.

He held a number of pastoral and educational positions in the Archdiocese of Medellín. He served as a formator at the Major Seminary of Medellín in 1988 and from 1990 to 1991, parish administrator of San Simón Apóstol in Medellín in 1991, and parish priest of San Rafael in Envigado from 1992 to 1994. In 1996 he served as spiritual director at the Major Seminary, professor and chaplain at the Pontifical Bolivarian University, and collaborator at Nuestra Señora de los Dolores parish in Medellín. He subsequently served as parish priest of La Sagrada Familia in Medellín in 1998 and Santa Ana in Sabaneta from 1999 to 2010.

From 2005 to 2015 he was a member of the archdiocesan team for priestly pastoral ministry. From 2007 he served as general administrator of the Fundación Autónoma Sacerdotal Padre Arcila. From 2011 to 2015 he was parish priest of Nuestra Señora del Rosario in Bello and episcopal vicar for the Northern Zone of the Archdiocese of Medellín. During this period he was also a member of the presbyteral council, the college of consultors, and the archdiocesan council of government.

== Episcopate ==
=== Bishop of Mocoa-Sibundoy ===
On 15 October 2015, Pope Francis appointed Maldonado Monsalve bishop of Mocoa-Sibundoy, succeeding Luis Alberto Parra Mora. He received his episcopal consecration on 3 December 2015 at the Metropolitan Cathedral of Medellín, with Archbishop Ricardo Antonio Tobón Restrepo as principal consecrator. He took canonical possession of the diocese on 15 December 2015 at the Cathedral of Saint Michael the Archangel in Mocoa, with Ettore Balestrero, then Apostolic Nuncio to Colombia, presiding over the ceremony.

During his episcopate in Mocoa-Sibundoy, Maldonado Monsalve also participated in the national pastoral structures of the Colombian Episcopal Conference. For the 2024–2027 triennium, he was appointed president of the Episcopal Commission for Education and Cultures.

=== Bishop of Santa Rosa de Osos ===
On 10 April 2025, Pope Francis appointed Maldonado Monsalve bishop of Santa Rosa de Osos, transferring him from Mocoa-Sibundoy. He was installed as bishop of Santa Rosa de Osos on 29 May 2025.

As bishop of Santa Rosa de Osos, Maldonado Monsalve became the successor to Elkin Fernando Álvarez Botero, who had died in 2023. The diocese forms part of the ecclesiastical province of Santa Fe de Antioquia.
