= Pederodiana =

Africa Proconsularis (125 AD)

Pederodiana, was a Roman town of the Roman province of Byzacena. Its exact location is unknown but it is tentatively identified with Oum-Federa or Fodra in modern Tunisia. During the Roman Empire the town was also the seat of an ancient episcopal see under Carthage.

== History ==
The only known bishop of this diocese is Adeodato, who took part in the synod in Carthage in 484 called by the Vandal king, Huneric, after which Adeodato was exiled.

Today Pederodiana survives as a titular bishopric and the current bishop Simon Ok Hyun of Kwangju.

Known bishops include:

- Adeodato (mentioned in 484)
- Alcides Mendoza Castro (1967–1983)
- Fabián Marulanda López (1986–1989)
- Simon Ok Hyun-jin (2011-2022)
- Federico Guillermo Wechsung (2023–present)
