= Archdiocese of Florencia =

Catholic archdiocese in Colombia

Coordinates: 1.6130°N 75.6150°W

Archdiocese of Florencia Archidioecesis Florentiae

Catholic

Location
- Country: Colombia
- Ecclesiastical province: Florencia

Statistics
- Area: 15,441 km^{2} (5,962 sq mi)
- Population: Total; Catholics: (as of 2006); 260,000; 222,800 (85.7%)

Information
- Rite: Latin Rite
- Established: 8 February 1951 (75 years ago)
- Cathedral: Our Lady of Lourdes Cathedral, Florencia

Current leadership
- Pope: Leo XIV
- Archbishop: Omar de Jesús Mejía Giraldo
- Bishops emeritus: Fabián Marulanda López

Map

The Roman Catholic Archdiocese of Florencia (Latin: Florentiae) is an archdiocese located in the city of Florencia, Caquetá in Colombia.

On Saturday, April 27, 2013, Pope Francis appointed Omar de Jesús Mejía Giraldo, a priest of the Roman Catholic Diocese of Sonsón - Rionegro, Colombia, who up until then had been serving as rector of the national major seminary "Christ the Priest" in La Ceja, Colombia, as the sixth ordinary and fourth bishop of the Roman Catholic Diocese of Florencia.

He succeeded Bishop Jorge Alberto Ossa Soto, who had served from 2003 until his July 2011 appointment by Pope Benedict XVI as bishop of the Roman Catholic Diocese of Santa Rosa de Osos in Santa Rosa de Osos, Colombia.

On July 13, 2019, Florencia was raised to a metropolitan archdiocese, so Giraldo became an archbishop then.

== History ==
- 8 February 1951: Established as Apostolic Vicariate of Florencia from the Apostolic Vicariate of Caquetá
- 9 December 1985: Promoted as Diocese of Florencia
- 13 July 2019: Elevated as Archdiocese of Florencia

== Ordinaries ==
- Vicars Apostolic of Florencia
  - Antonio Torasso (10 January 1952 – 22 October 1960)
  - Angelo Cuniberti (18 April 1961 – 15 November 1978)
  - José Luis Serna Alzate (15 November 1978 – 9 December 1985)
- Bishops of Florencia
  - José Luis Serna Alzate (9 December 1985 – 8 July 1989), appointed Bishop of Líbano-Honda
  - Fabián Marulanda López (22 December 1989 – 19 July 2002)
  - Jorge Alberto Ossa Soto (21 January 2003 – 15 July 2011), appointed bishop of the Roman Catholic Diocese of Santa Rosa de Osos
  - Omar de Jesús Mejía Giraldo (27 April 2013 – 13 July 2019); elevated to metropolitan archbishop
- Archbishops of Florencia
  - Omar de Jesús Mejía Giraldo (since 13 July 2019)

== Suffragan dioceses ==
- Diocese of Mocoa–Sibundoy
- Diocese of San Vicente del Caguán

== See also ==
- Roman Catholicism in Colombia
