= San Giovanni Crisostomo al Monte Sacro Alto =

St. John Chrysostom in Monte Sacro Alto
- San Giovanni Crisostomo al Monte Sacro Alto (in Italian); Sancti Ioannis Chrysostomi in regione vulgo Monte Sacro Alto (in Latin)
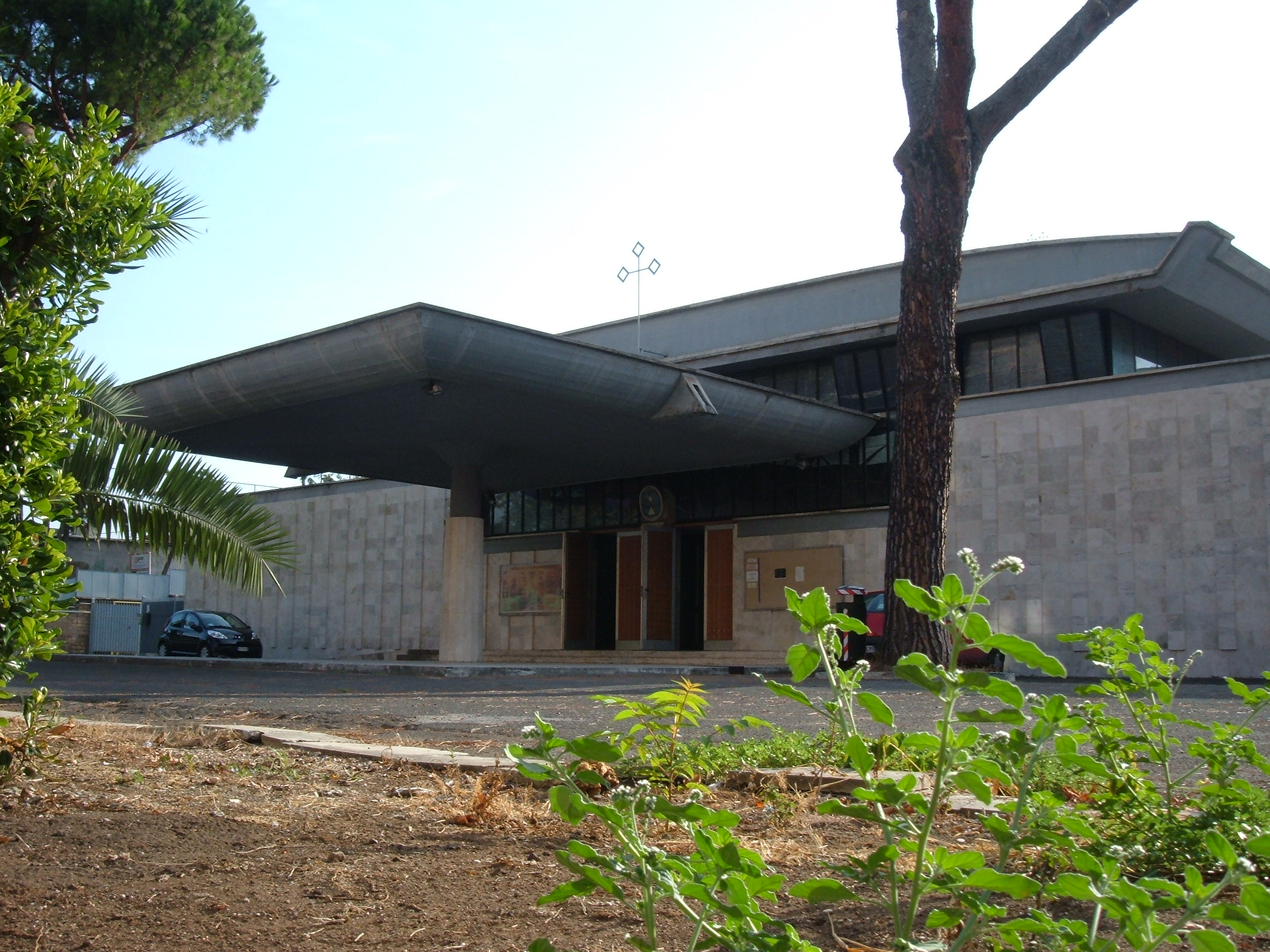
- Facade
- Click on the map for a fullscreen view
- 41°56′26″N 12°32′34″E
- Location: Via Emilio de Marchi 40, Rome
- Country: Italy
- Denomination: Roman Catholic
- Tradition: Latin

History
- Status: Titular church
- Dedication: John Chrysostom
- Consecrated: 1969

Architecture
- Architect(s): Ennio Canino and Viviana Rizzi
- Architectural type: Church
- Style: Modern
- Groundbreaking: 1968
- Completed: 1969

Administration
- District: Lazio

San Giovanni Crisostomo al Monte Sacro Alto is a church in Rome named in honour of John Chrysostom, in the district Monte Sacro Alto, Via Emilio De Marchi, off the Via Nomentana.

== History ==
It was built between 1968 and 1969 to a design by Ennio Canino architects and Viviana Rizzi: it was consecrated February 16, 1969. The church is home parish, established January 15, 1964, by Clement Micara Cardinal Vicar with the decree Quo aptius. And is the seat of the cardinal's title of "Saint John Chrysostom in Monte Sacro Alto", founded by Pope Paul VI April 26, 1969. In back of the church is a plaque that recalls the visits of two Popes: Paul VI 16 March 1969 and Pope John Paul II on 25 March 1990.

== Description ==
Outside the church is a large concrete canopy supported by a pillar that covers the entrance, surmounted by a cross. Above the entrance into the arms of Paul VI majolica. The interior is very simple, concrete, is marked by stained-glass windows that give light liturgical classroom: they are portrayed in the different moments of the biblical account of creation; near the chancel depicting the Creation of man which is reminiscent of Michelangelo in the Sistine Chapel ceiling. Also in the area of the presbytery, of two high concrete columns, they have posted two modern icons by the artist Mauro Magni: in a depicts the titular saint of the church, the theologian of the fourth century John Chrysostom; the second depicts the baptism of Jesus: it is near the baptismal font At the entrance of the church two side chapels are located: the right of the Blessed Sacrament chapel closed by a glass wall; on the left the chapel of Confession, which houses a wooden statue of the Madonna and Child.

== List of Cardinal Protectors ==
- Vicente Enrique y Tarancón (30 April 1969 – 24 November 1994)
- Bernard Agré (21 February 2001 – 9 June 2014)
- José de Jesús Pimiento Rodriguez (14 February 2015 – 3 September 2019)
- Jean-Claude Hollerich (5 October 2019 – present)
