= Apostolic Vicariate of Puerto Leguízamo-Solano =

Catholic missionary jurisdiction in Colombia

Apostolic Vicariate of Puerto Leguízamo-Solano Apostolicus Vicariatus Portus Leguizamensis-Solanensis

Location
- Country: Colombia

Statistics
- Area: 64,000 km^{2} (25,000 sq mi)
- Population: Total; Catholics: (as of 2013); 46,000; 36,000 (87.3%)
- Parishes: 6

Information
- Denomination: Catholic Church
- Rite: Roman Rite
- Established: 21 February 2013 (12 years ago)
- Cathedral: Catedral Nuestra Señora del Carmen

Current leadership
- Pope: Francis
- Apostolic Vicar: Joaquín Humberto Pinzón Güiza, I.M.C.

Map

The Apostolic Vicariate of Puerto Leguízamo-Solano (Latin: Apostolicus Vicariatus Portus Leguizamensis-Solanensis) is a Latin missionary pre-diocesan jurisdiction of the Catholic Church in southern Colombia.

It is exempt, i.e. directly dependent on the Holy See, not part of any ecclesiastical province.

Its cathedral episcopal see is Catedral Nuestra Señora del Carmen, dedicated to Our Lady of Mount Carmel, located in the town of Puerto Leguízamo, in Putumayo department.

== History ==
On 21 February 2013 Pope Benedict XVI established the Apostolic Vicariate of Puerto Leguízamo–Solano, on territory split off from the then Apostolic Vicariate of San Vicente-Puerto Leguízamo, the remainder of which was soon after renamed the Apostolic Vicariate of San Vicente del Caguán.

== Episcopal ordinaries ==
- Joaquín Humberto Pinzón Güiza, I.M.C. (21 February 2013 – ...), Titular Bishop of Otočac (2013.02.21 – ...)

== See also ==
- Roman Catholicism in Colombia
