= Archdiocese of Ibagué =

Catholic archdiocese in Colombia

Coordinates: 4.4389°N 75.2319°W

Archdiocese of Ibagué Archidioecesis Ibaguensis

Catholic

Location
- Country: Colombia
- Ecclesiastical province: Ibagué

Statistics
- Area: 6,044 km^{2} (2,334 sq mi)
- Population: Total; Catholics: (as of 2006); 560,344; 504,310 (90.0%)

Information
- Rite: Latin Rite
- Established: 20 May 1900 (126 years ago)
- Cathedral: Catedral de la Inmaculada Concepción

Current leadership
- Pope: Leo XIV
- Archbishop: Orlando Roa Barbosa
- Auxiliary Bishops: Miguel Fernando González Mariño
- Bishops emeritus: Flavio Calle Zapata

Map

Website
- www.arquidiocesisdeibague.org

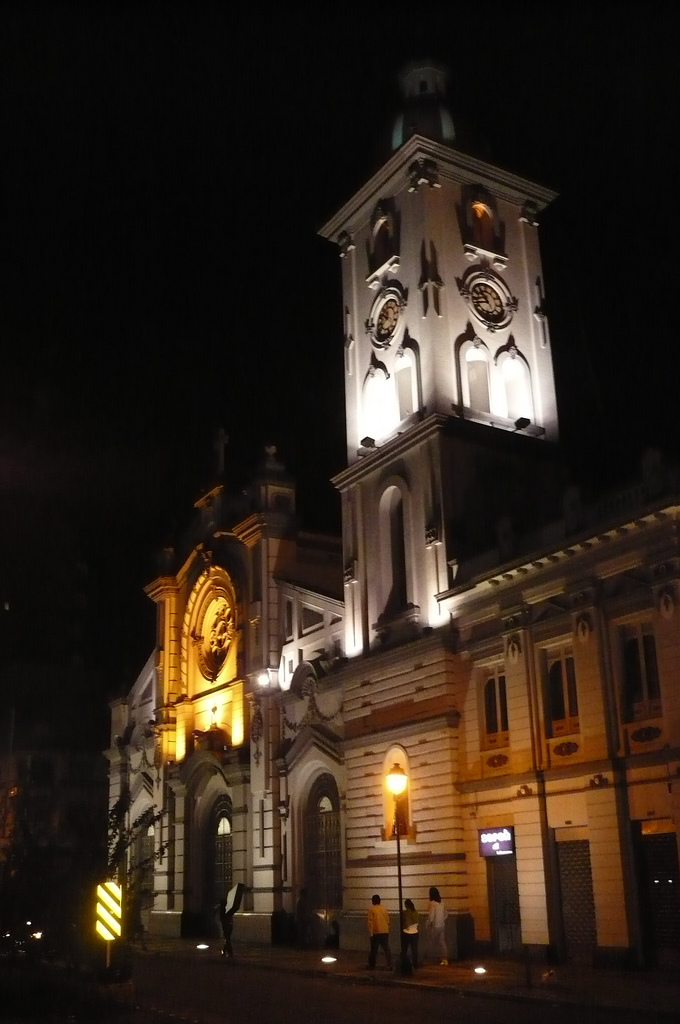
Cathedral of the Immaculate Conception

The Roman Catholic Archdiocese of Ibagué (Latin: Ibaguensis) is an archdiocese located in the city of Ibagué in Colombia.

== History ==
- 20 May 1900: Established as Diocese of Ibagué from the Diocese of Tolima
- 14 December 1974: Promoted as Metropolitan Archdiocese of Ibagué

== Bishops ==
- Bishops of Ibagué
  - Ismael Perdomo Borrero † (8 Jun 1903 – 5 Feb 1923) Appointed, Coadjutor Archbishop of Bogotá
  - Pedro María Rodríguez Andrade † (10 Apr 1924 – 17 Mar 1957) Retired
  - Arturo Duque Villegas † (17 Mar 1957 – 7 Jul 1959) Appointed, Archbishop of Manizales
  - Rubén Isaza Restrepo † (2 Nov 1959 – 3 Jan 1964) Appointed, Coadjutor Archbishop of Bogotá
  - José Joaquín Flórez Hernández † (17 March 1964 – 14 Dec 1974 see below)
- Archbishops of Ibagué
  - José Joaquín Flórez Hernández † (see above 14 Dec 1974 – 25 Mar 1993) Retired
  - Juan Francisco Sarasti Jaramillo, C.I.M. (25 Mar 1993 – 17 Aug 2002) Appointed, Archbishop of Cali
  - Flavio Calle Zapata (10 Jan 2003 – 19 March 2019)
  - Orlando Roa Barbosa (29 May 2020 -)

=== Auxiliary bishops ===
- Arturo Duque Villegas † (1949-1957), appointed Bishop here
- Fabián Marulanda López (1986-1989), appointed Bishop of Florencia
- Orlando Roa Barbosa (2012-2015), appointed Bishop of Espinal; later returned here as Archbishop
- Miguel Fernando González Mariño (2016-)

== Suffragan dioceses ==
- Espinal
- Garzón
- Líbano–Honda
- Neiva

== See also ==
- Roman Catholicism in Colombia
