= Arturo Duque Villegas =

Roman Catholic archbishop (1899–1977)

- Archbishop of Manizales
- Native name: Arturo Duque y Villegas
- Church: Catholic Church
- Archdiocese: Archdiocese of Manizales
- In office: 7 July 1959 – 22 May 1975
- Predecessor: Luis Concha Córdoba
- Successor: José de Jesús Pimiento Rodríguez
- Previous posts: Bishop of Ibagué (1957-1959); Titular Bishop of Vatarba (1949-1957); Auxiliary Bishop of Ibagué (1949-1957)

Orders
- Ordination: 20 March 1926
- Consecration: 17 March 1957 by Joaquín García Benítez

Personal details
- Born: 27 November 1899 Abejorral, Antioquia Department, Colombia
- Died: 26 July 1977 (aged 77)

Duque arms

The Most Revd Arturo Duque Villegas (27 November 1899 – 26 July 1977) was Roman Catholic Archbishop of Manizales in Colombia from 1959 to 1975.

== See also ==
- Episcopal Conference of Colombia
- Manizales
- Monsignor
