= El Espinal, Tolima =

Espinal
- Municipality and town
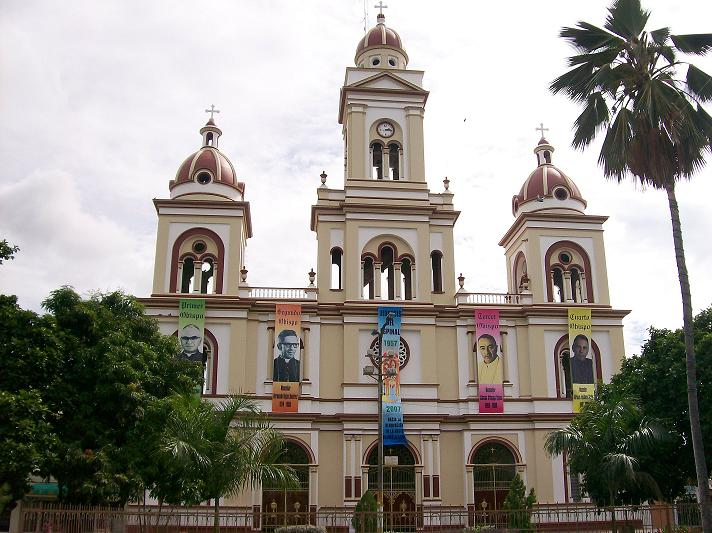

- Flag Coat of arms

- Location of the municipality and town of El Espinal in the Tolima Department of Colombia.

- Location in Colombia
- Coordinates: 04°09′10″N 74°53′19″W
- Country: Colombia
- Department: Tolima Department
- Founded: 1754

Government
  - Mayor: Wilson Gutiérrez Montaña

Area
  - Municipality and town: 217 km^{2} (84 sq mi)
  - Urban: 9.2 km^{2} (3.6 sq mi)
- Elevation: 323 m (1,060 ft)

Population (2018 census)
  - Municipality and town: 70,494
  - Density: 325/km^{2} (841/sq mi)
  - Urban: 50,664
  - Urban density: 5,500/km^{2} (14,000/sq mi)
- Demonym: Espinaluno
- Time zone: UTC-5 (Colombia Standard Time)
- Area code: +57 - 8
- Website: Official website (in Spanish)

Espinal is a Colombian municipality and town located in the Department of Tolima, 146 km southwest from Bogotá. It is the second most important town of the department and is the rice capital of the center of the country. It is flanked by the Magdalena and Coello rivers. El Espinal is known for the manufacture of typical musical instruments and its cuisine is known for tamales and the suckling pig, which are the typical dishes of the region. It has a total area of 231 km^{2}, an urban area of 4.26 km^{2}, and a rural area of 212.74 km^{2}.

The town is the seat of the Roman Catholic Diocese of Espinal.

== Climate ==
Despite its low elevation, El Espinal has a temperate climate with abundant rainfall from March to May and from October to November. The increased solar radiation during these months due to the position of the sun increases temperatures in the jungle and favors the formation of storms in the mountainous areas. In contrast, the drier seasons of the year are from January to February and from July to August. Frost occurs in rural areas, mist is extremely rare, and 10 days out of the year are foggy. Historians report that between the years 1930 and 1940 there were many hailstorms.

Temperatures
Maximum recorded temperature	47 °C
Mean maximum Temperature	32 °C
Average minimum Temperature	19 °C
Minimum recorded temperature	9 °C

Climate data for El Espinal (Nataima), elevation 431 m (1,414 ft), (1981–2010)
Month	Jan	Feb	Mar	Apr	May	Jun	Jul	Aug	Sep	Oct	Nov	Dec	Year
Mean daily maximum °C (°F)	32.9 (91.2)	33.1 (91.6)	32.6 (90.7)	31.8 (89.2)	31.6 (88.9)	32.0 (89.6)	33.3 (91.9)	34.7 (94.5)	33.8 (92.8)	32.0 (89.6)	31.4 (88.5)	31.8 (89.2)	32.6 (90.7)
Daily mean °C (°F)	28.4 (83.1)	28.5 (83.3)	28.4 (83.1)	27.7 (81.9)	27.5 (81.5)	27.7 (81.9)	28.3 (82.9)	29.4 (84.9)	28.9 (84.0)	27.8 (82.0)	27.4 (81.3)	27.6 (81.7)	28.1 (82.6)
Mean daily minimum °C (°F)	22.8 (73.0)	22.9 (73.2)	23.0 (73.4)	22.7 (72.9)	22.5 (72.5)	22.0 (71.6)	21.8 (71.2)	22.4 (72.3)	22.6 (72.7)	22.5 (72.5)	22.6 (72.7)	22.6 (72.7)	22.5 (72.5)
Average precipitation mm (inches)	73.6 (2.90)	97.2 (3.83)	162.1 (6.38)	178.5 (7.03)	201.6 (7.94)	89.4 (3.52)	52.0 (2.05)	51.9 (2.04)	167.9 (6.61)	175.8 (6.92)	131.3 (5.17)	95.2 (3.75)	1,474.7 (58.06)
Average precipitation days	7	9	12	16	16	10	7	6	12	16	13	10	134
Average relative humidity (%)	69	69	70	75	76	71	63	58	64	71	75	74	70
Mean monthly sunshine hours	192.2	160.9	161.2	153.0	170.5	174.0	195.3	201.5	180.0	176.7	168.0	179.8	2,113.1
Mean daily sunshine hours	6.2	5.7	5.2	5.1	5.5	5.8	6.3	6.5	6.0	5.7	5.6	5.8	5.8
Source: Instituto de Hidrologia Meteorologia y Estudios Ambientales

Climate data for Chicoral, El Espinal, elevation 475 m (1,558 ft), (1981–2010)
Month	Jan	Feb	Mar	Apr	May	Jun	Jul	Aug	Sep	Oct	Nov	Dec	Year
Mean daily maximum °C (°F)	32.5 (90.5)	32.6 (90.7)	32.3 (90.1)	31.1 (88.0)	31.1 (88.0)	31.8 (89.2)	32.8 (91.0)	33.9 (93.0)	33.0 (91.4)	31.5 (88.7)	30.9 (87.6)	31.3 (88.3)	32.0 (89.6)
Daily mean °C (°F)	27.6 (81.7)	27.7 (81.9)	27.6 (81.7)	26.8 (80.2)	26.8 (80.2)	27.1 (80.8)	27.6 (81.7)	28.3 (82.9)	27.9 (82.2)	27.0 (80.6)	26.8 (80.2)	27.0 (80.6)	27.4 (81.3)
Mean daily minimum °C (°F)	22.7 (72.9)	22.5 (72.5)	22.6 (72.7)	22.1 (71.8)	21.8 (71.2)	21.5 (70.7)	21.2 (70.2)	22.0 (71.6)	22.3 (72.1)	21.9 (71.4)	22.2 (72.0)	22.3 (72.1)	22.1 (71.8)
Average precipitation mm (inches)	61.2 (2.41)	98.9 (3.89)	137.1 (5.40)	225.3 (8.87)	193.5 (7.62)	86.7 (3.41)	65.9 (2.59)	56.1 (2.21)	126.9 (5.00)	167.0 (6.57)	136.2 (5.36)	94.8 (3.73)	1,449.6 (57.07)
Average precipitation days	6	8	10	15	15	8	7	6	10	14	11	8	116
Average relative humidity (%)	70	71	72	77	77	73	68	63	67	74	76	75	72
Source: Instituto de Hidrologia Meteorologia y Estudios Ambientales

== Geography ==
El Espinal is located on the plains of the Upper Magdalena region at 322 meters above sea level and surrounded by the Central and Eastern mountain ranges of the Colombian Andes.

== 2022 bullring collapse ==
On June 26, 2022, several boxes of a bullring collapsed, causing the balance of approximately hundreds of people injured and 4 dead. The images of the moment in which the flimsy wooden structures crowded with people collapse have given an account of the disaster that occurred during a corraleja, as the popular festivals are known in the country in which the public goes down to the arena to face several bulls. In a corraleja, unlike other styles of bullfighting, the bulls are not killed at the end of the fight, but due to the informal nature of the event, it can lead to serious accidents.

Then president-elect, Gustavo Petro (who in his presidential campaign spoke against shows involving animal, including bullfighting), spoke on Twitter, stating that "I hope that all the people affected by the collapse of the Plaza de El Espinal can get out of their wounds", and that "this had already happened in Sincelejo" while shared an aerial video showing the collapse of the plaza. The outgoing president, Iván Duque, who was in Portugal at the time, lamented the "terrible tragedy" and stated that he would request an investigation into the events. The outgoing Vice President and Foreign Minister Marta Lucia Ramirez also regretted the events, and criticized the lack of security in the place. The governor of Tolima, Ricardo Orozco, confirmed that among the four deceased were two women, a man and a minor, while the injured numbered from 30 to close to 300. He also anticipated that he will request "the suspension of all these kinds of parties [which are] the corralejas", alleging that the events "attack life" and encourage "animal abuse". The issue of bullfighting has been controversial and problematic in Colombia in recent years.

The tragedy opened a new debate on the legality and safety of the coralejas and bullfights throughout the country, as well as animal cruelty.

== Economy ==
Its economy is based on agriculture, especially rice and other products such as cotton, sorghum, soybean, maize, and tobacco among others. It also includes enterprises from other sectors, including mills, which generate a high percentage of employment in the city.
