= Our Lady of Lourdes Cathedral, Florencia =

Coordinates: 1.6128°N 75.6150°W

Our Lady of Lourdes Cathedral
- Catedral de Nuestra Señora de Lourdes
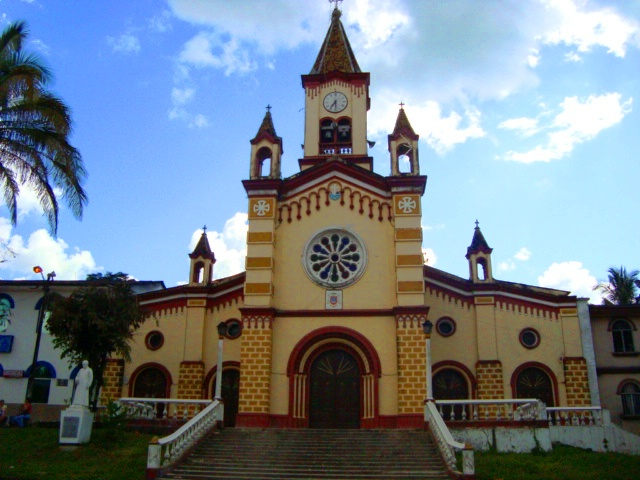
- Our Lady of Lourdes Cathedral
- Location: Florencia
- Country: Colombia
- Denomination: Roman Catholic Church

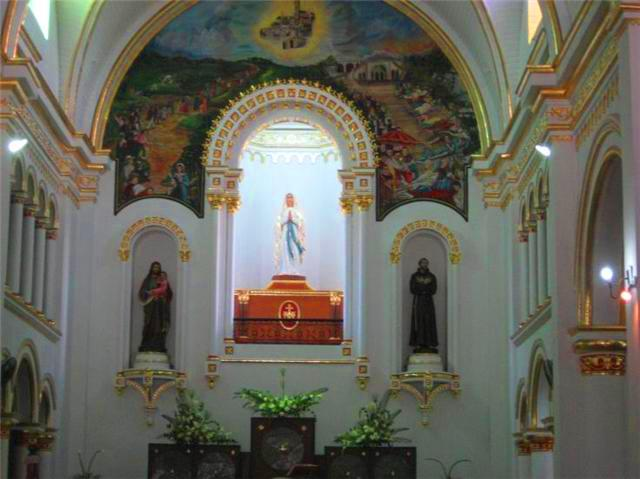
Internal view

Our Lady of Lourdes Cathedral (Spanish: Catedral de Nuestra Señora de Lourdes), also called Florencia Cathedral, is a Catholic cathedral in the municipality of Florencia, in Colombia. It is the principal church of the Roman Catholic Diocese of Florencia.

== Description ==
The cathedral is dedicated to the Virgin Mary under the title of Our Lady of Lourdes. It is located on the western side of the San Francisco de Asis Square in the municipality of Florencia, capital of Caquetá Department. The cathedral is the principal church of the Roman Catholic Diocese of Florencia, after elevation to diocese by Pope John Paul II with the Bull Quo Expeditius published on December 9, 1985.

== History ==
The first very humble construction was made in 1908. After the parishioners and the commissarial and municipal authorities called for construction of a new cathedral, work began on July 20, 1932, under the direction of the Spanish friar Jaime Igualada. On February 11, 1937, after five years of work, the current building was completed and was blessed.

== See also ==
- Roman Catholicism in Colombia
- Our Lady of Lourdes Cathedral, Daegu
