= Fabio de Jesús Morales Grisales =

Colombian Roman Catholic prelate (1934–2025)

His Excellency Fabio de Jesús Morales Grisales
- Bishop Emeritus of Mocoa–Sibundoy
- Archdiocese: Florencia
- Diocese: Mocoa–Sibundoy
- Appointed: 29 October 1999
- Term ended: 4 October 2003
- Predecessor: Rafael Arcadio Bernal Supelano
- Successor: Luis Alberto Parra Mora
- Previous post: Titular Bishop of Budua (1991–1999)

Orders
- Ordination: 4 October 1959
- Consecration: 15 June 1991 by Paolo Romeo

Personal details
- Born: 27 July 1934 Neira, Colombia
- Died: 10 February 2025 (aged 90) Buga, Colombia

Fabio de Jesús Morales Grisales (27 July 1934 – 10 February 2025) was a Colombian Roman Catholic prelate. He was bishop of Mocoa–Sibundoy from 1991 to 2003. He died on 10 February 2025, at the age of 90.

Catholic Church titles
Preceded by Rafael Arcadio Bernal Supelano	Bishop of Mocoa–Sibundoy; 1999–2003	Succeeded by Luis Alberto Parra Mora
Preceded by Pastor Cuquejo	Titular Bishop of Budua; 1991–1999	Succeeded by Jorge García Isaza
