= Fabio Betancur Tirado =

Colombian ecclesiastic

His Excellency, The Most Reverend Fabio Betancur Tirado
- Archbishop of Manizales
- Church: Catholic Church
- Appointed: May 3, 1982
- Term ended: October 7, 2010
- Predecessor: José de Jesús Pimiento Rodríguez
- Successor: Gonzalo Restrepo Restrepo
- Other posts: Archbishop of Manizales (1996–2010); Bishop of La Dorada-Guaduas (1984–1996); Auxiliar bishop of Medellín; Titular Bishop of Sereddeli

Orders
- Ordination: September 6, 1964 by Tulio Botero Salazar
- Consecration: July 3, 1995 by Alfonso López Trujillo

Personal details
- Born: Fabio Betancur Tirado; October 30, 1938 Armenia, Antioquia, Colombia
- Died: November 20, 2011 (aged 73) Medellín, Antioquia, Colombia
- Denomination: Roman Catholic

Ordination history of Fabio Betancur Tirado
History
Priestly ordination
- Ordained by: Tulio Botero Salazar
Episcopal consecration
- Consecrated by: Alfonso López Trujillo

Styles of Fabio Betancur Tirado
- Reference style: The Most Reverend
- Spoken style: Your Excellency
- Religious style: Your Excellency

Fabio Betancur Tirado (October 30, 1938 – November 20, 2011) was a Colombian ecclesiastic of the Catholic Church. He served as auxiliary bishop of Medellín, later became the first bishop of the diocese of La Dorada-Guaduas and later was archbishop of the archdiocese of Manizales, of which, once retired, he served as archbishop emeritus.

He was ordained a priest on September 6, 1964 in the chapel of the Major Seminary by the Archbishop of Medellín, Monsignor Tulio Botero Salazar. Betancur Tirado was named a bishop in 1982, resigning in 2010.
