= Luis Augusto Castro Quiroga =

Catholic prelate (1942–2022)

His Excellency Luis Augusto Castro Quiroga I.M.C.
- Archbishop Emeritus of Tunja
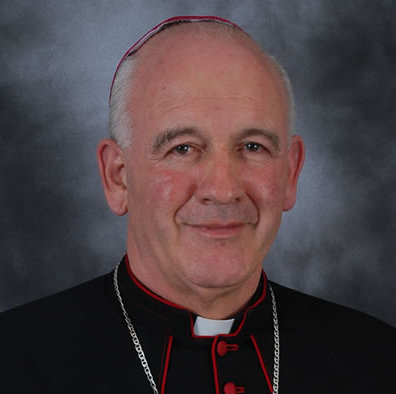
- Appointed: 2 February 1998
- Term ended: 11 February 2020
- Predecessor: Augusto Trujillo Arango
- Successor: Gabriel Ángel Villa Vahos
- Previous posts: Apostolic Vicar of San Vicente-Puerto Leguízamo and Titular Bishop of Aquae Flaviae (1986–1998)

Orders
- Ordination: 24 December 1967
- Consecration: 29 November 1986 by Angelo Acerbi

Personal details
- Born: 8 April 1942 Bogotá, Colombia
- Died: 2 August 2022 (aged 80) Chía, Cundinamarca, Colombia

Luis Augusto Castro Quiroga, I.M.C. (8 April 1942 – 2 August 2022) was a Colombian Roman Catholic prelate.

== Biography ==
Castro Quiroga was born in Bogotá, Colombia and was ordained to the priesthood in 1967. He served as the titular bishop of Aquae Flaviae and the vicar apostolic of San Vicente from 1986 to 1998. He was appointed to serve as archbishop of the Roman Catholic Archdiocese of Tunja, Colombia from 1998 until his retirement in 2020.

He died on 2 August 2022, at the age of eighty, as a result of COVID-19.

Catholic Church titles
Preceded by Augusto Trujillo Arango	Archbishop Emeritus of Tunja; 1998–2020	Succeeded by Gabriel Ángel Villa Vahos
Preceded by Post created	Apostolic Vicar of San Vicente-Puerto Leguízamo; 1986–1998	Succeeded by Francisco Javier Múnera Correa
Preceded by Edouard Mununu Kasiala	Titular Bishop of Aquae Flaviae; 1986–1998	Succeeded by Vicente Costa
