= Abraham Escudero Montoya =

- Bishop of Palmira
- Church: Catholic Church
- Diocese: Diocese of Palmira
- In office: 2 February 2007 – 6 November 2009
- Predecessor: Orlando Antonio Corrales García
- Successor: Edgar de Jesús García Gil
- Previous posts: Bishop of Espinal (1990-2007); Titular Bishop of Risinium (1986-1990); Auxiliary Bishop of Medellín (1986-1990)

Orders
- Ordination: 8 June 1968
- Consecration: 21 June 1986 by Alfonso López Trujillo

Personal details
- Born: 24 January 1940 Urrao, Antioquia Department, Colombia
- Died: 6 November 2009 (aged 69)

Abraham Escudero Montoya (24 January 1940 – 6 November 2009) was the Catholic bishop of the Diocese of Palmira, Colombia.

Ordained on 8 June 1968, by Monsignor Tulio Botero Salazar, Archbishop of Medellín. Escudero Montoya was named bishop on 22 May 1986, and he was ordained on 21 June 1986.
