= Cathedral Basilica of Our Lady of the Rosary, Manizales =

Catholic cathedral in Manizales, Colombia

Manizales Cathedral
- Metropolitan Cathedral Basilica of Our Lady of the Rosary
- Catedral Basílica Metropolitana de Nuestra Señora del Rosario
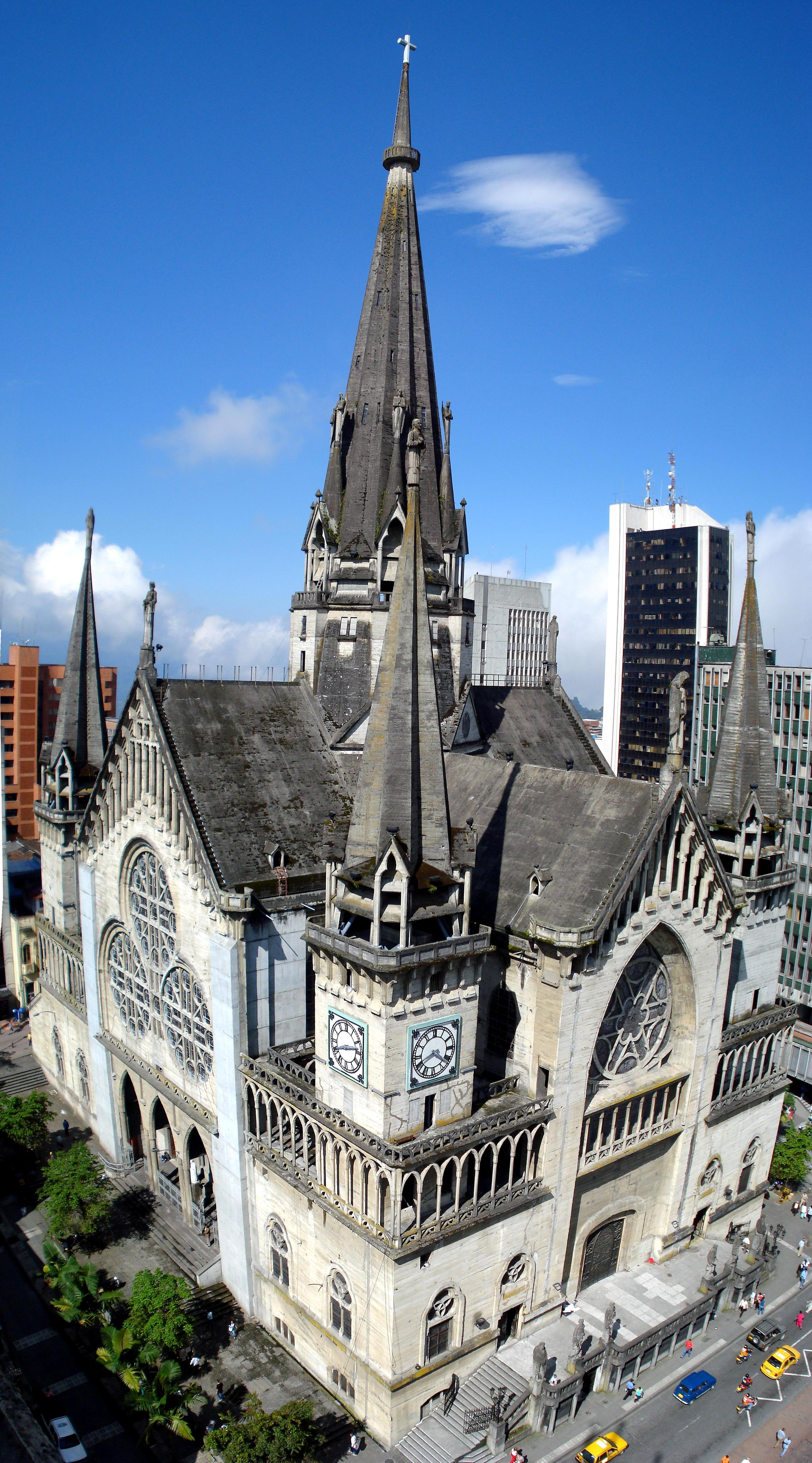
- Aerial view of the cathedral
- Manizales Cathedral
- 5.0675°N 75.5174°W
- Location: Plaza de Bolívar, Manizales, Caldas
- Country: Colombia
- Denomination: Catholic

History
- Status: Cathedral, Basilica
- Dedication: Our Lady of the Rosary

Architecture
- Functional status: Active
- Heritage designation: National Monument of Colombia
- Designated: 1984
- Architect: Julien Polti
- Architectural type: Church
- Style: Neogothic
- Years built: 1928–1939
- Groundbreaking: February 5, 1928
- Completed: September 29, 1939

Specifications
- Capacity: 5,000
- Length: 74 m (243 ft)
- Width: 56 m (184 ft)
- Height: 119 m (390 ft) (maximum)
- Materials: Reinforced concrete

Administration
- Archdiocese: Archdiocese of Manizales

The Metropolitan Cathedral Basilica of Our Lady of the Rosary (Spanish: Catedral Basílica Metropolitana de Nuestra Señora del Rosario), also known as Manizales Cathedral, is a Catholic cathedral located in front of the Plaza de Bolívar in the historic center of Manizales, Colombia. At 119 m (117 m from the base of the building), it is the tallest cathedral in Colombia and Hispanic America, and the tallest Neogothic church in the Americas. It was the tallest building in Colombia for 33 years, from 1936 to 1969.

It is one of three neogothic religious architectural jewels of Manizales, along with the Basilica of the Immaculate Conception and the Church of the Sacred Heart of Jesus (Los Agustinos). The cathedral is a National Monument of Colombia (declared in 1984) and was elevated to the rank of minor basilica by Pope Pius XII in 1951.

== History ==
=== Previous temples ===
The first chapel in Manizales was built in 1849 on the same site as the current cathedral, measuring 8 by 4 meters, made of wood and straw; it was demolished in 1854. A larger parish church was built between 1854 and 1869 using wood, rammed earth, and brick masonry. Due to seismic activity, it was demolished in 1886.

The second temple, which became the first cathedral when the Diocese of Manizales was created in 1900, was built between 1888 and 1897 under the design of Bogotá architect Mariano Sanz de Santa María. It was severely damaged by a fire on July 3, 1925, and completely destroyed by another fire on March 20, 1926.

=== Current cathedral ===
After the 1926 fire, Bishop Tiberio de Jesús Salazar y Herrera convened a reconstruction committee. An initial national architectural competition in 1926 was declared void. A second competition was held in Paris in 1927, with a jury of French historical monuments experts. The winner was French architect Julien Polti, chief architect of historical monuments in Paris.

Construction began on February 5, 1928, with the laying of the first stone by Bishop Salazar. The work was halted in the early 1930s due to the global economic crisis, then resumed on February 7, 1935. The cathedral was built using reinforced concrete, a pioneering method at the time. The four lateral towers were completed and the vaulted roofs built by December 1936. The cathedral withstood an earthquake in 1938 while still under construction. The building was fully completed on September 29, 1939.

The cathedral has since survived major earthquakes in 1962 (which caused the collapse of one lateral tower, later rebuilt between 1989–1990), 1979, and 1999.

One of the cathedral's towers collapsed into the nave following the 2026 Colombia earthquake.

== Architecture ==
The cathedral has a Greek cross floor plan, three naves, a presbytery with a baldachin over the main altar, and a choir for the canons. The architectural style is predominantly Gothic, with some Byzantine and Romanesque details.

=== Dimensions and records ===
- Area: 2,300 m^{2} (25,000 sq ft)
- Capacity: 5,000 people
- Length: 74 m (243 ft)
- Width: 56 m (184 ft)
- Central tower height (including cross): 119 m (390 ft) (115 m (377 ft) to the tower's top)
- Lateral towers: 62 m (203 ft) each

The cathedral is the tallest neogothic church in the Americas, surpassing the Basilica of the National Vow in Quito, Ecuador (whose towers measure approximately 83 m).

=== Baldachin ===
The baldachin over the main altar is 14 m (46 ft) high, gilded, and features 64 carved wooden images of saints on its columns, representing the celestial court. It was designed by Rambusch (New York), manufactured by Stuflessu in Ortisei, Italy (Bolzano province), assembled by Hernando Carvajal, and gilded with gold leaf by Manuel Vargas. The baldachin and altar were moved 12 m (39 ft) forward on October 24, 1990.

=== Stained glass ===
The cathedral houses 141 stained-glass windows plus three rose windows (one frontal, two lateral), covering approximately 1,000 m^{2} (11,000 sq ft). The windows were created by French, Italian, and Colombian artists. Notable windows include the Last Supper, Abraham and Melchizedek, the Rich Man and Lazarus (Epulon and Lazarus), and the Parable of the Ten Virgins. The main rose window (over the central portal) was replaced in 1968 with a kaleidoscope-style geometric design by Mario de Ayala of Cali, evoking the Virgin of the Rosary. The lateral rose windows (Redemption and Incarnation) were also made by de Ayala based on designs by Alberto Martorell.

=== Doors ===
The central bronze door weighs 5 tons and was designed by Jesuit priest Eduardo Ospina Bernal, with molds by Ismael Font and casting by Leopoldo del Río Pérez. It depicts the Virgin of the Rosary, the current cathedral, the first parish church and its demolition, and the construction and fire of the first cathedral. The western door ("The Parish") shows the Mass, preaching, procession, and viaticum; the eastern door ("The Municipality of Caldas") shows the mayor, city council, town crier, and marketplace. Both were made by Leopoldo del Río Pérez.

=== Sculptures ===
The four lateral towers are crowned with sculptures of John the Baptist, John Vianney, Peter Claver, and Rose of Lima. The main atrium features six 2 m (6 ft 7 in) high ferroconcrete sculptures: the four evangelists (Matthew, Mark, Luke, and John) by Italian sculptor Alideo Tazzioli Fontanini, and Peter and Paul by Gonzalo Quintero Castaño and his student Guillermo Botero Gutiérrez.

=== Polish Corridor (Corredor Polaco) ===
The Polish Corridor is a walkway located at 102 m (335 ft) height on the central tower, offering a 360° panoramic view of Manizales, nearby municipalities, and natural wonders such as the Nevado del Ruiz volcano. It was originally opened to the public in 1959 but closed in 1977 due to safety concerns and deteriorating wooden stairs. After a complete renovation and installation of new staircases (costing around US$100,000), it was reopened in 2008. As of 2026, guided tours (approximately 75 minutes) ascend to the corridor and also visit the stained glass levels and the clock tower. The Polish Corridor is the fifth highest cathedral balcony in the world.

== Gallery ==
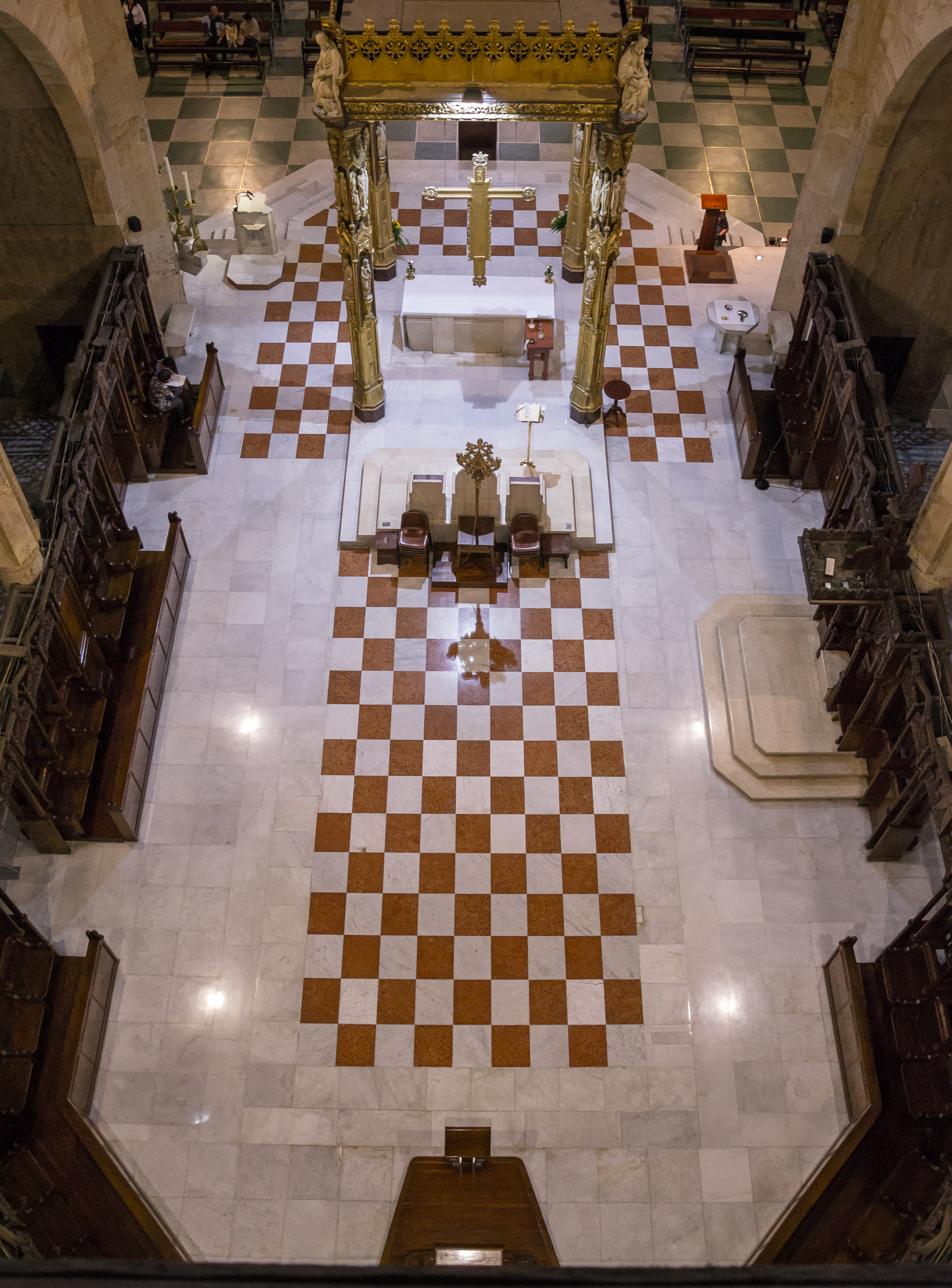
Interior view

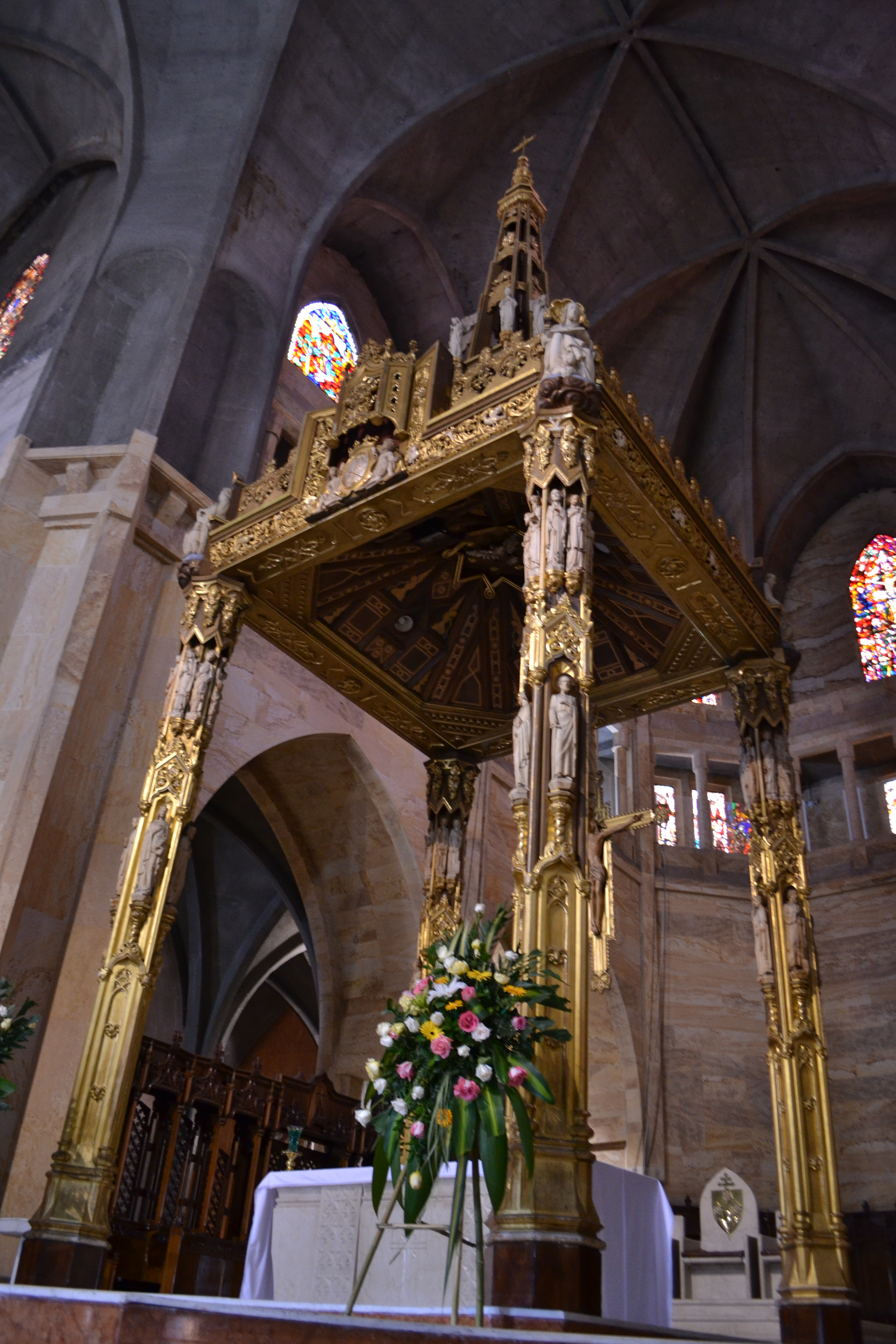
Baldachin

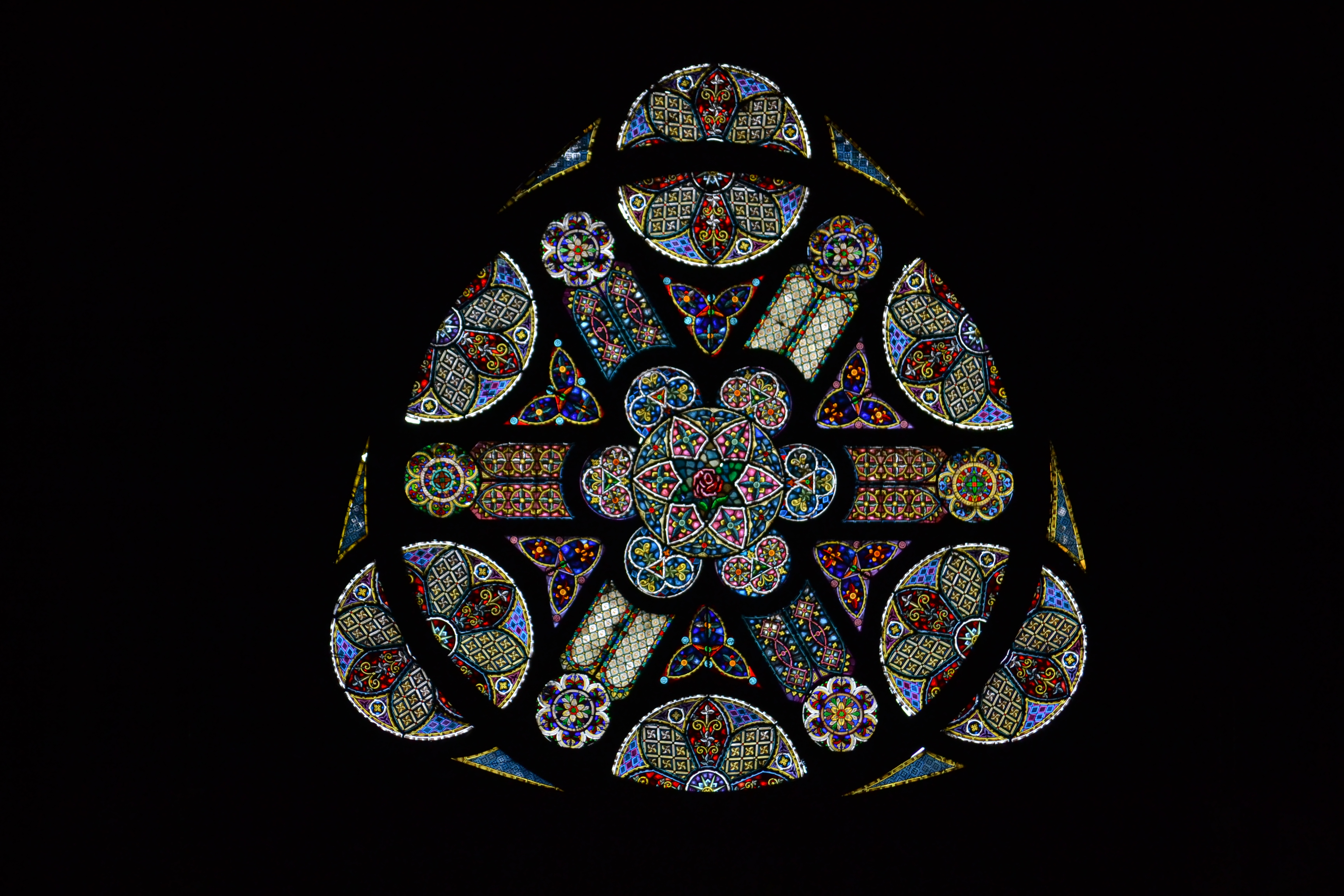
Main rose window

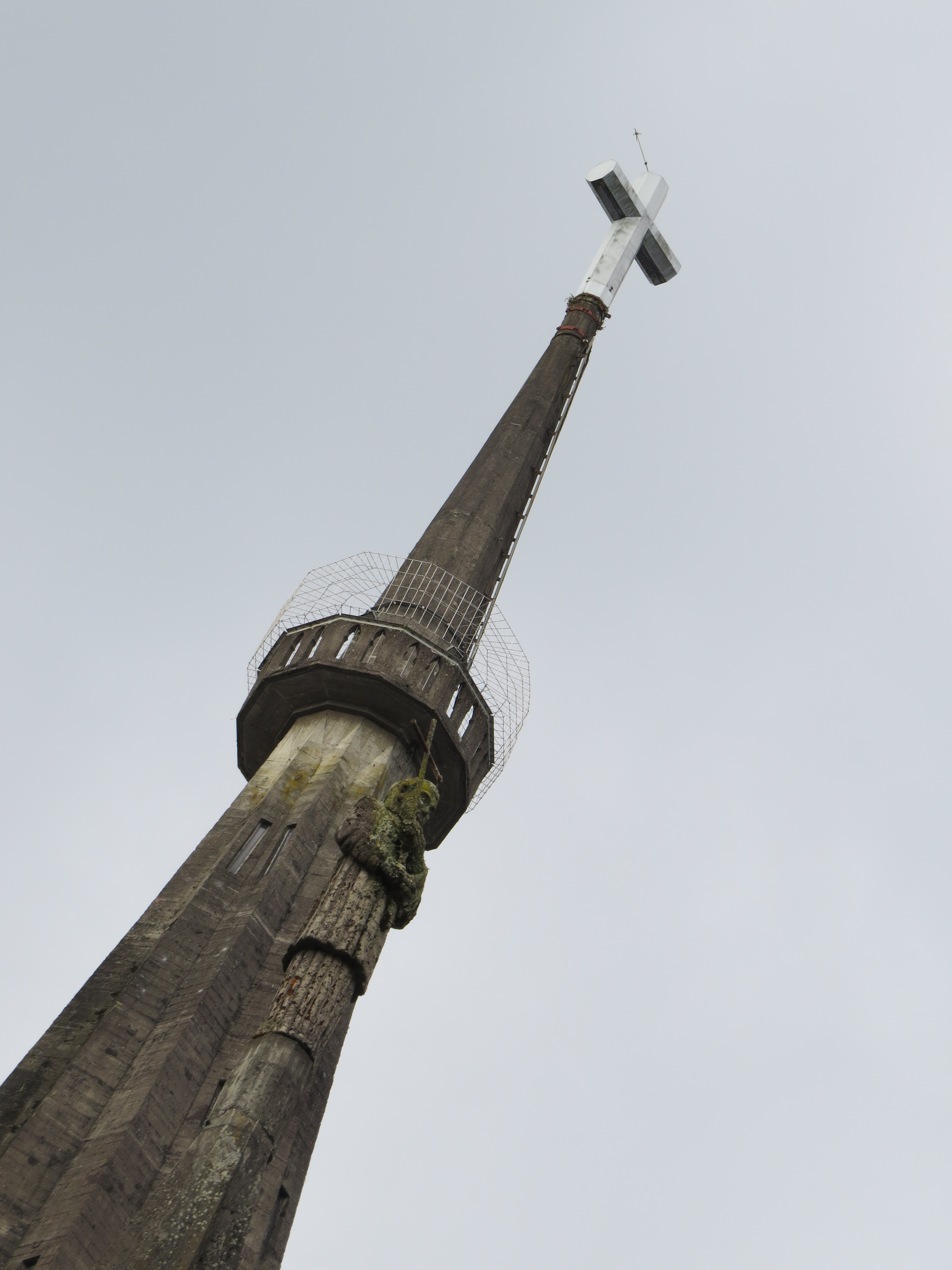
Polish Corridor exterior

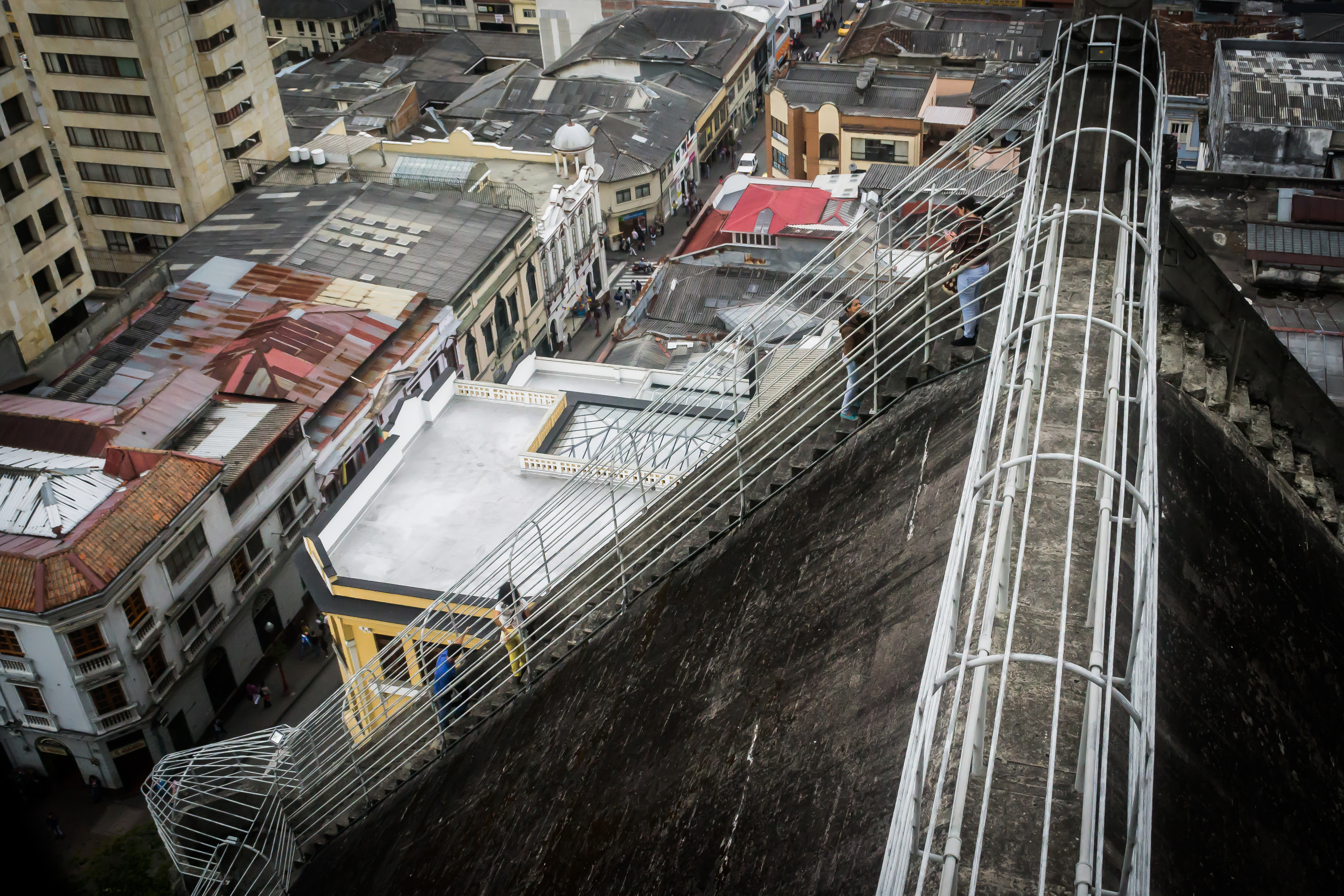
View from the Polish Corridor

== See also ==
- Roman Catholicism in Colombia
- List of tallest churches in the world
- List of basilicas in Colombia
- Our Lady of the Rosary

== Bibliography ==
- Giraldo Mejía, Hernán. Memorial de la arquitectura republicana Manizales: Centro histórico. Caldas, 2003.
- Jaramillo Rivera, Juan Pablo. Catedral de Manizales setenta años simbolizando una ciudad. Centro de Estudios Históricos de Manizales.
- Naranjo, Bernardo. La Catedral Basílica de Manizales, Fe y Arte. Editorial Santa Ana, Chinchiná, Caldas, 1998.
