= Diocese of Garzón =

Diocese of the Catholic Church in Colombia

Coordinates: 2.1968°N 75.6276°W

Diocese of Garzón Dioecesis Garzonensis

Catholic

Location
- Country: Colombia
- Ecclesiastical province: Ibagué

Statistics
- Area: 9,667 km^{2} (3,732 sq mi)
- Population: Total; Catholics: (as of 2023); 558,729; 489,998 (87.7%)
- Parishes: 64

Information
- Denomination: Catholic Church
- Sui iuris church: Latin Church
- Rite: Roman Rite
- Established: 20 May 1900; 126 years ago
- Cathedral: Catedral de San Miguel Arcángel
- Secular priests: 135 (125 Diocesan, 10 Religious Orders)

Current leadership
- Pope: Leo XIV
- Bishop: Jaime Alberto Cabrera Arcos
- Metropolitan Archbishop: Orlando Roa Barbosa

Map

Website
- www.diocesisgarzon.com

The Roman Catholic Diocese of Garzón (Latin: Garzonensis) is a diocese located in the city of Garzón in the ecclesiastical province of Ibagué in Colombia.

== History ==
- 20 May 1900: Established as Diocese of Garzón from the Diocese of Tolima
- 25 February 1964: Renamed as Diocese of Garzón-Neiva
- 24 July 1972: Renamed as Diocese of Garzón

== Bishops ==
=== Ordinaries, in reverse chronological order ===
Bishops of Garzón, below

- Jaime Alberto Cabrera Arcos, (2025.01.28 – Present)
  - Apostolic Administrator Miguel Fernando González Mariño (2022.02.21 – 2025.03.25), Bishop of Espinal
- Fabio Duque Jaramillo, O.F.M. (2012.06.11 – 2022.02.09)
- Rigoberto Corredor Bermúdez (2003.12.19 – 2011.07.15), appointed Bishop of Pereira
- Libardo Ramírez Gómez (1986.10.18 – 2003.03.15), resigned
- Ramón Mantilla Duarte, C.Ss.R. (1977.04.26 – 1985.10.25), appointed Bishop of Ipiales
- Octavio Betancourt Arango (1975.11.10 – 1977.04.26), resigned
- José de Jesús Pimiento Rodríguez (see below 1972.07.24 – 1975.05.22), appointed Archbishop of Manizales

Bishop of Garzón-Neiva, below

- José de Jesús Pimiento Rodríguez (1964.02.29 – 1972.07.24 see above)
- Gerardo Martínez Madrigal (see below 1964.02.25 – 1964.02.29), resigned

Bishops of Garzón, below

- Gerardo Martínez Madrigal (1942.06.23 – 1964.02.25 see above)
- José Ignacio López Umaña (1924.04.10 – 1942.03.15), appointed Coadjutor Archbishop of Cartagena
- Esteban Rojas Tovar (1900.05.20 – 1922.07.21), resigned

=== Other priests of this diocese who became bishops ===
- Jacinto Vásquez Ochoa (1939-1956), appointed Bishop of Espinal
- Ismael Perdomo Borrero (1896-1903), appointed Bishop of Ibagué

== See also ==
- Roman Catholicism in Colombia
