= Diocese of Espinal =

Diocese of the Catholic Church in Colombia

Coordinates: 4.1499°N 74.8821°W

Diocese of El Espinal Dioecesis Espinalensis

Catholic

Location
- Country: Colombia
- Ecclesiastical province: Ibagué

Statistics
- Area: 14,000 km^{2} (5,400 sq mi)
- Population: Total; Catholics: (as of 2006); 439,000; 331,000 (75.4%)

Information
- Rite: Latin Rite
- Established: 18 March 1957 (69 years ago)
- Cathedral: Catedral Nuestra Señora del Rosario

Current leadership
- Pope: Leo XIV
- Bishop: Miguel Fernando González Mariño

Map

Website
- diocesisdelespinal.org

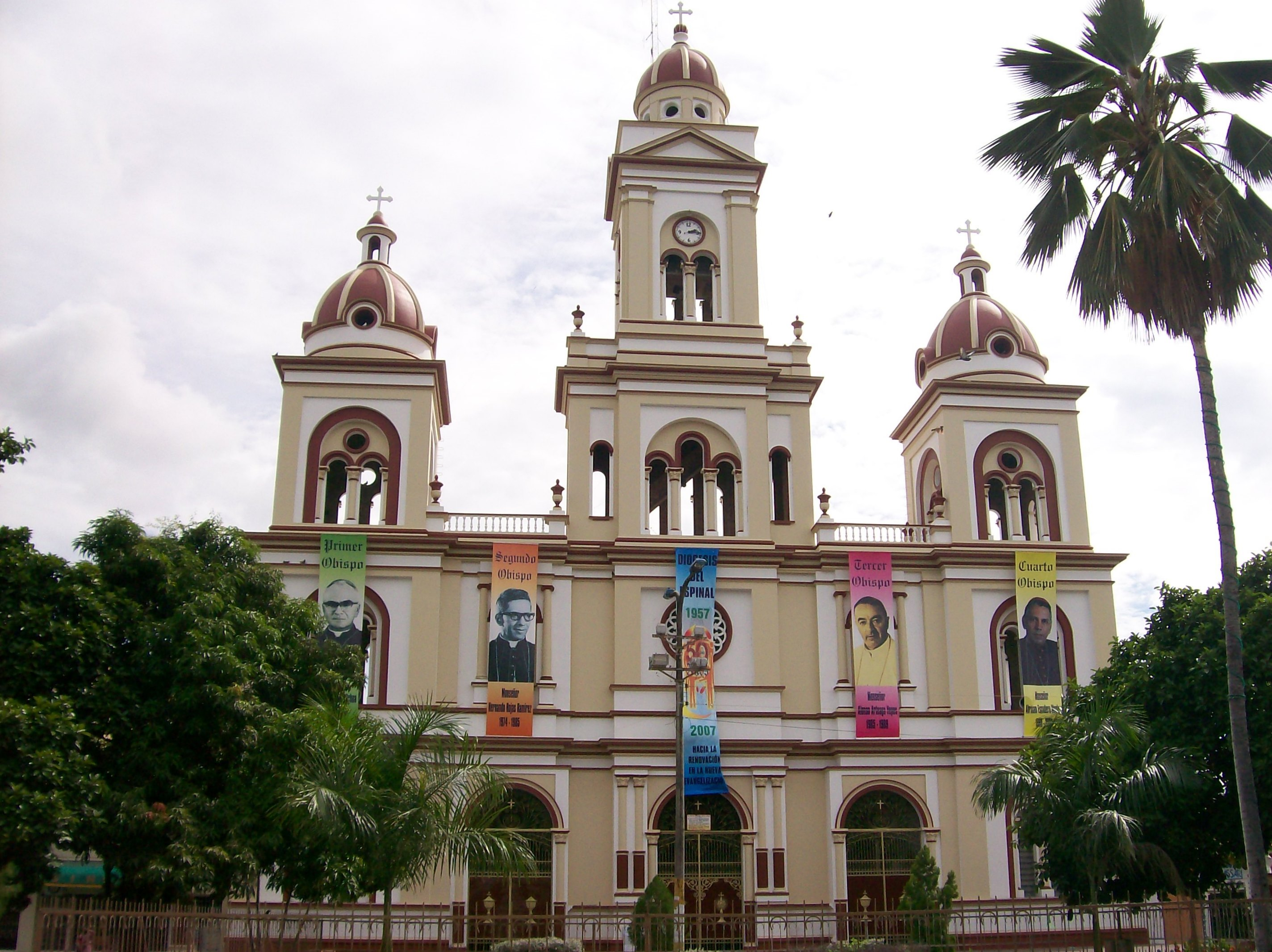
Cathedral of Our Lady of Rosary

The Roman Catholic Diocese of Espinal (Latin: Espinalensis) is a diocese located in the city of Espinal in the ecclesiastical province of Ibagué in Colombia.

== History ==
- 18 March 1957: Established as Diocese of El Espinal from the Diocese of Ibagué

== Bishops ==
=== Ordinaries ===
- Jacinto Vásquez Ochoa (1956.12.22 – 1974.12.12)
- Hernando Rojas Ramirez (1974.12.12 – 1985.07.01), appointed Bishop of Neiva
- Alonso Arteaga Yepes (1985 – 1989.10.30)
- Abraham Escudero Montoya (1990.04.30 – 2007.02.02), appointed Bishop of Palmira
- Pablo Emiro Salas Anteliz (2007.10.24 – 2014.08.18), appointed Bishop of Armenia
- Orlando Roa Barbosa (2015.05.30 - 2020.05.29), appointed Archbishop of Ibagué
- Miguel Fernando González Mariño (2020.12.19 - )

=== Coadjutor bishop ===
- Hernando Rojas Ramirez (1972-1974)

=== Other priest of this diocese who became bishop ===
- Juan Carlos Barreto Barreto, appointed Bishop of Quibdó in 2013

== See also ==
- Roman Catholicism in Colombia
