= Archdiocese of Manizales =

Catholic archdiocese in Colombia

Coordinates: 5.0674°N 75.5174°W

Metropolitan Archdiocese of Manizales Archidioecesis Metropolitae Manizalensis

Catholic
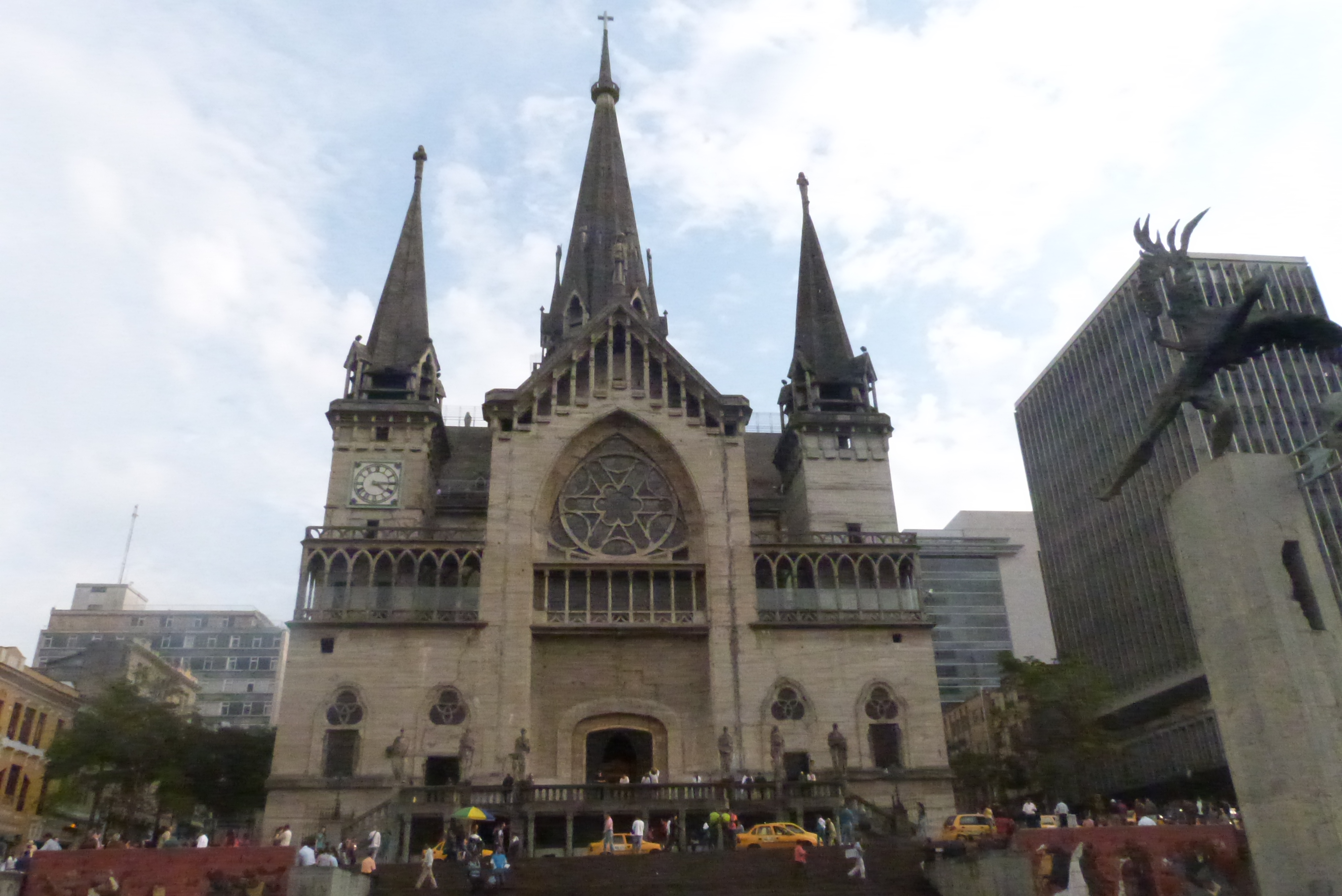
- Cathedral Basilica of Our Lady of Rosary

- Coat of arms

Location
- Country: Colombia
- Ecclesiastical province: Manizales

Statistics
- Area: 3,848 km^{2} (1,486 sq mi)
- Population: Total; Catholics: (as of 2004); 750,000; 731,000 (97.5%)

Information
- Sui iuris church: Latin Church
- Rite: Roman Rite
- Established: 11 April 1900 (126 years ago)
- Cathedral: Cathedral Basilica of Our Lady of Rosary, Manizales

Current leadership
- Pope: Leo XIV
- Metropolitan Archbishop: José Miguel Gómez Rodríguez
- Bishops emeritus: Gonzalo Restrepo Restrepo

Map

Website
- www.arquidiocesisdemanizales.com

The Catholic Archdiocese of Manizales (Latin: Manizalensis) is an archdiocese located in the city of Manizales in Colombia.

== History ==
- 11 April 1900: Established as Diocese of Manizales from the Diocese of Medellín
- 10 May 1954: Promoted as Metropolitan Archdiocese of Manizales

== Special churches ==
- Minor Basilicas:
  - Catedral Basílica Metropolitana de Nuestra Señora del Rosario in Manizales
  - Basílica Nuestra Señora de las Victorias in Santa Rosa de Cabal

== Ordinaries ==
- Bishops of Manizales
  - Gregorio Nazianzeno Hoyos † (16 Dec 1901 – 25 Oct 1921) Died
  - Tiberio de Jesús Salazar y Herrera † (6 Jul 1922 – 7 Jul 1932) Appointed, Coadjutor Archbishop of Medellín
  - Juan Manuel González Arbeláez † (3 Jul 1933 – 6 Jun 1934) Appointed, Titular Archbishop of Aenus
  - Luis Concha Córdoba † (13 Jul 1935 – 10 May 1954) see below; future Cardinal
- Archbishops of Manizales
  - Luis Concha Córdoba † (10 May 1954 – 18 May 1959) see above; Appointed, Archbishop of Bogotá (Cardinal in 1961)
  - Arturo Duque Villegas † (7 Jul 1959 – 22 May 1975) Retired
  - José de Jesús Pimiento Rodríguez † (22 May 1975 – 15 Oct 1996) Resigned (became a Cardinal on 14 February 2015)
  - Fabio Betancur Tirado † (15 Oct 1996 Appointed – 7 Oct 2010) Resigned
  - Gonzalo Restrepo Restrepo (7 Oct 2010 – 6 Jan 2020) previously Coadjutor Archbishop; resigned
  - José Miguel Gómez Rodríguez (25 Apr 2021 Appointed – present)

=== Coadjutor archbishop ===
- Gonzalo Restrepo Restrepo (2009–2010)

=== Auxiliary bishops ===
- Baltasar Álvarez Restrepo † (1949–1952), appointed Bishop of Pereira
- Samuel Silverio Buitrago Trujillo, C.M. † (1968–1972), appointed Bishop of Montería
- Alberto Uribe Urdaneta † (1953–1957), appointed Bishop of Sonsón
- Augusto Trujillo Arango † (1957–1960), appointed Bishop of Jericó

=== Other priests of this diocese who became bishops ===
- Rubén Isaza Restrepo †, appointed Auxiliary Bishop of Cartagena in 1952
- Alberto Giraldo Jaramillo (priest here, 1958–1960), appointed Auxiliary Bishop of Popayán in 1974
- José Miguel Gómez Rodríguez, appointed Bishop of Líbano-Honda in 2004
- Óscar González Villa †, appointed Bishop of Girardota in 2006 (did not take effect)
- Luis Horacio Gómez González †, appointed Vicar Apostolic of Puerto Gaitán in 2014
- José Libardo Garcés Monsalve, appointed Bishop of Málaga-Soatá in 2016

== Suffragan dioceses ==
- Armenia
- La Dorada–Guaduas
- Pereira

== See also ==
- Catholic Church in Colombia
