= Diocese of Mocoa–Sibundoy =

Diocese of the Catholic Church in Colombia

Diocese of Mocoa–Sibundoy Dioecesis Mocoënsis-Sibundoyensis

Catholic

Location
- Country: Colombia
- Ecclesiastical province: Florencia

Statistics
- Area: 24,885 km^{2} (9,608 sq mi)
- Population: Total; Catholics: (as of 2023); 382,000; 328,560 (86.0%)
- Parishes: 39

Information
- Denomination: Catholic Church
- Sui iuris church: Latin Church
- Rite: Roman Rite
- Established: 20 December 1904; 121 years ago
- Cathedral: Catedral de San Alfonso Maria de Liguori in Sibundoy
- Co-cathedral: Co-Catedral de San Miguel Arcángel in Mocoa
- Secular priests: 67 (63 Diocesan, 4 Religious Orders)

Current leadership
- Pope: Leo XIV
- Bishop: Sede vacante
- Metropolitan Archbishop: Omar de Jesús Mejía Giraldo
- Apostolic Administrator: Juan Carlos Cárdenas Toro

Map

Website
- www.diocmocoasibundoy.org

The Roman Catholic Diocese of Mocoa–Sibundoy (Latin: Mocoën(sis)-Sibundoyen(sis)) is a diocese located in the cities of Mocoa and Sibundoy in the ecclesiastical province of Florencia in Colombia.

== History ==
- 20 December 1904: Created as Prefecture Apostolic of Caquetá, split from Diocese of Pasto
- 31 May 1930: Promoted as Apostolic Vicariate of Caquetá
- 8 February 1951: Name changed to Apostolic Vicariate of Sibundoy
- 29 October 1999: Promoted as Diocese of Mocoa – Sibundoy
- 13 July 2019: Changed province from Popayán to Florencia

== Ordinaries ==
Prefect of Caquetá (Roman rite)

- Josep Pujol i Coll, O.F.M. Cap. (1905.01.28 – 1930.05.31), resigned

Vicars Apostolic of Caquetá (Roman rite)

- Miguel Gaspar Monconill y Viladot, O.F.M. Cap. (1930.06.30 – 1946.02.26)
- Camil Plàcid Crous i Salichs, O.F.M. Cap. (1947.04.10 – 1951.02.08 see below)

Vicars Apostolic of Sibundoy (Roman rite)

- Camil Plàcid Crous i Salichs, O.F.M. Cap. (see above 1951.02.08 – 1971.01.16), retired
- Ramón Mantilla Duarte, C.Ss.R. (1971.01.16 – 1977.04.26), appointed Bishop of Garzón
- Rafael Arcadio Bernal Supelano, C.Ss.R. (1978.02.27 – 1990.03.29), appointed Bishop of Arauca
- Fabio de Jesús Morales Grisales, C.Ss.R. (1991.04.15 – 1999.10.29 see below)

Bishops of Mocoa–Sibundoy (Roman rite)

- Fabio de Jesús Morales Grisales, C.Ss.R. (see above 1999.10.29 – 2003.10.04), resigned
- Luis Alberto Parra Mora (2003.10.04 – 2014.12.01), resigned
  - Apostolic Administrator Ivan Antonio Marín (2014.12.01 – 2015.12.15), Archbishop of Popayán
- Luis Albeiro Maldonado Monsalve (2015.10.15 – 2025.04.10), appointed Bishop of Santa Rosa de Osos
  - Apostolic Administrator Juan Carlos Cárdenas Toro (2025.05.29 – Present), Bishop of Pasto

== See also ==
- Roman Catholicism in Colombia
