= José Joaquín Flórez Hernández =

José Joaquín Flórez Hernández (12 November 1916 – 22 June 1996) was a Roman Catholic bishop in Colombia. He was Bishop of Duitama–Sogamoso from 1955 to 1964, then bishop from 1964 to 1974 and archbishop from 1974 to 1993 of Ibagué.
