= Elkin Fernando Álvarez Botero =

Colombian catholic priest (1968–2023)

His Excellency Elkin Fernando Álvarez Botero
- Bishop of Santa Rosa de Osos
- Archdiocese: Santa Fe de Antioquia
- Appointed: 22 October 2020
- Term ended: 8 July 2023
- Predecessor: Jorge Alberto Ossa Soto
- Successor: Vacant
- Previous posts: Auxiliary Bishop of Medellín and Titular Bishop of Gemellae in Numidia (2012–2020); Apostolic Administrator of Santa Fe de Antioquia (2022–2023)

Orders
- Ordination: 1 July 1993 by Flavio Calle Zapata
- Consecration: 4 August 2012 by Ricardo Antonio Tobón Restrepo

Personal details
- Born: 21 November 1968 Retiro, Antioquia, Colombia
- Died: 8 July 2023 (aged 54) Retiro, Antioquia, Colombia
- Motto: ASPICIENTIES IN IESUM
- Coat of arms

Styles of Elkin Fernando Álvarez Botero
- Reference style: His Excellency; The Most Reverend
- Spoken style: Your Excellency
- Religious style: Bishop

Elkin Fernando Álvarez Botero (21 November 1968 – 8 July 2023) was a Colombian Roman Catholic prelate. He was auxiliary bishop of Medellín from 2012 to 2020 and bishop of Santa Rosa de Osos from 2020 until his death.

Álvarez Botero died on 8 July 2023, at the age of 54.

Catholic Church titles
Preceded by Jorge Alberto Ossa Soto	Bishop of Santa Rosa de Osos; 2020–2023	Succeeded by Vacant
Preceded by George Stack	Titular Bishop of Gemellae in Numidia; 2012–2020	Succeeded by Wayne Lawrence Lobsinger
Preceded by —	Auxiliary Bishop of Medellín; 2012–2020	Succeeded by —
