= Angelo Cuniberti =

Angelo Cuniberti, I.M.C.
- Titular Bishop of Arsinoë in Cypro
- Church: Roman Catholic Church
- See: Titular See of Arsinoë in Cypro
- In office: 1961 - 2012 (His death)
- Predecessor: Wilhelmus Demarteau
- Successor: incumbent
- Previous post: Prelate

Orders
- Ordination: 29 June 1944
- Consecration: 21 May 1961

Personal details
- Born: 6 February 1921 Mondovì, Italy
- Died: 26 June 2012

Angelo Cuniberti, I.M.C. (6 February 1921 – 26 June 2012) was an Italian Prelate of the Roman Catholic Church.

Cuniberti was born in Mondovì, Italy and was ordained a priest on 29 June 1944 of the religious order of Consolata Missionary. Cuniberti was appointed Prelate to the Florencia Diocese on 18 April 1961 and resigned as prelate on 15 November 1978. Cuniberti was appointed Titular Bishop of Arsinoë in Cypro on 18 April 1961 and ordained on 21 May 1961.
