= Diocese of Santa Rosa de Osos =

Diocese of the Catholic Church in Colombia

Diocese of Santa Rosa de Osos Dioecesis Sanctae Rosae de Osos

Catholic
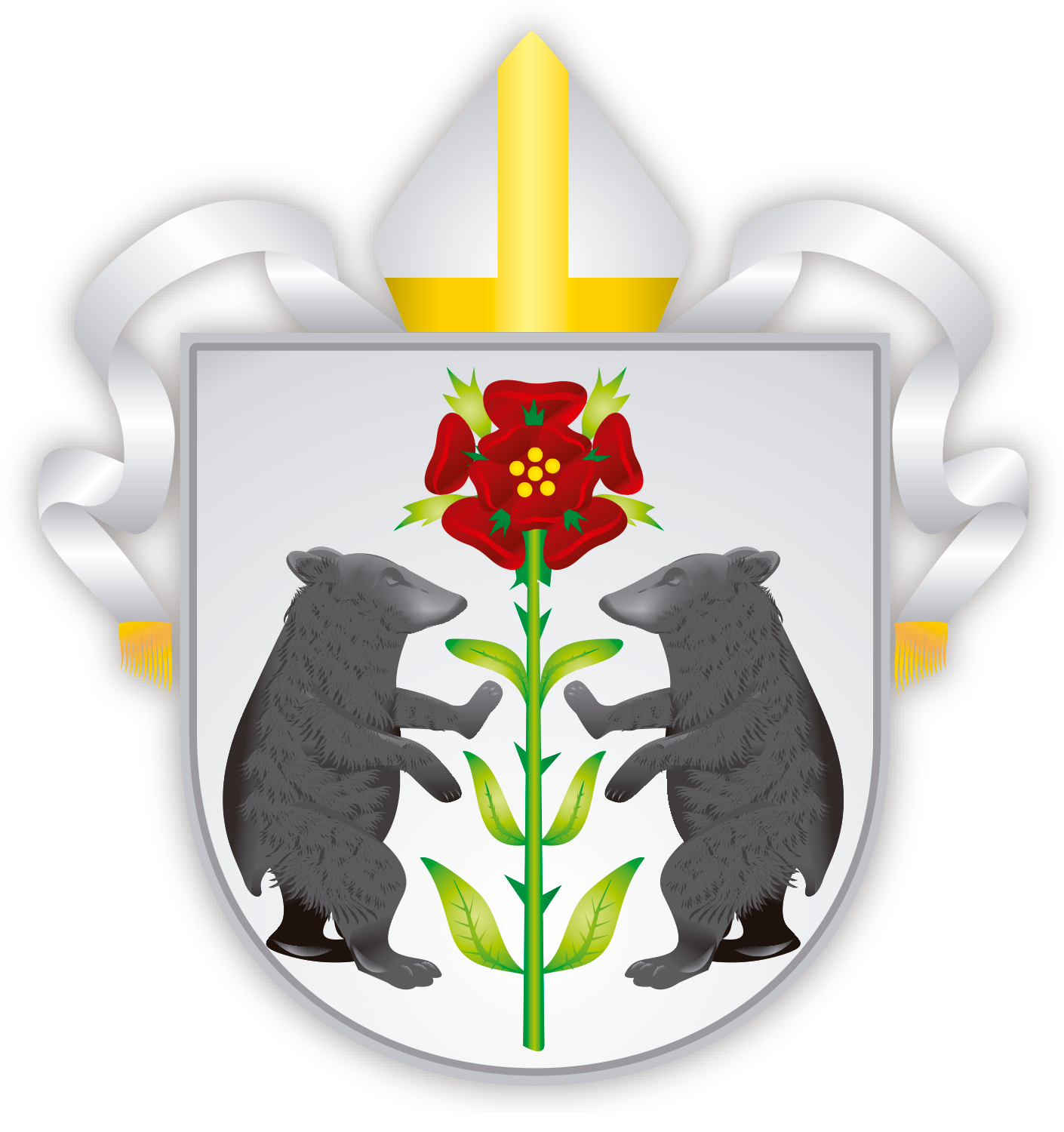
- Logo Diócesis de Santa Rosa de Osos

Location
- Country: Colombia
- Ecclesiastical province: Santa Fe de Antioquia

Statistics
- Area: 24,037 km^{2} (9,281 sq mi)
- Population: Total; Catholics: (as of 2004); 650,200; 630,000 (96.9%)

Information
- Rite: Latin Rite
- Established: 5 February 1917 (69 years ago)
- Cathedral: Our Lady of the Rosary of Chiquinquirá Cathedral

Current leadership
- Pope: Leo XIV
- Bishop: Luis Albeiro Maldonado Monsalve

Map

Website
- www.diocesissantarosadeosos.org

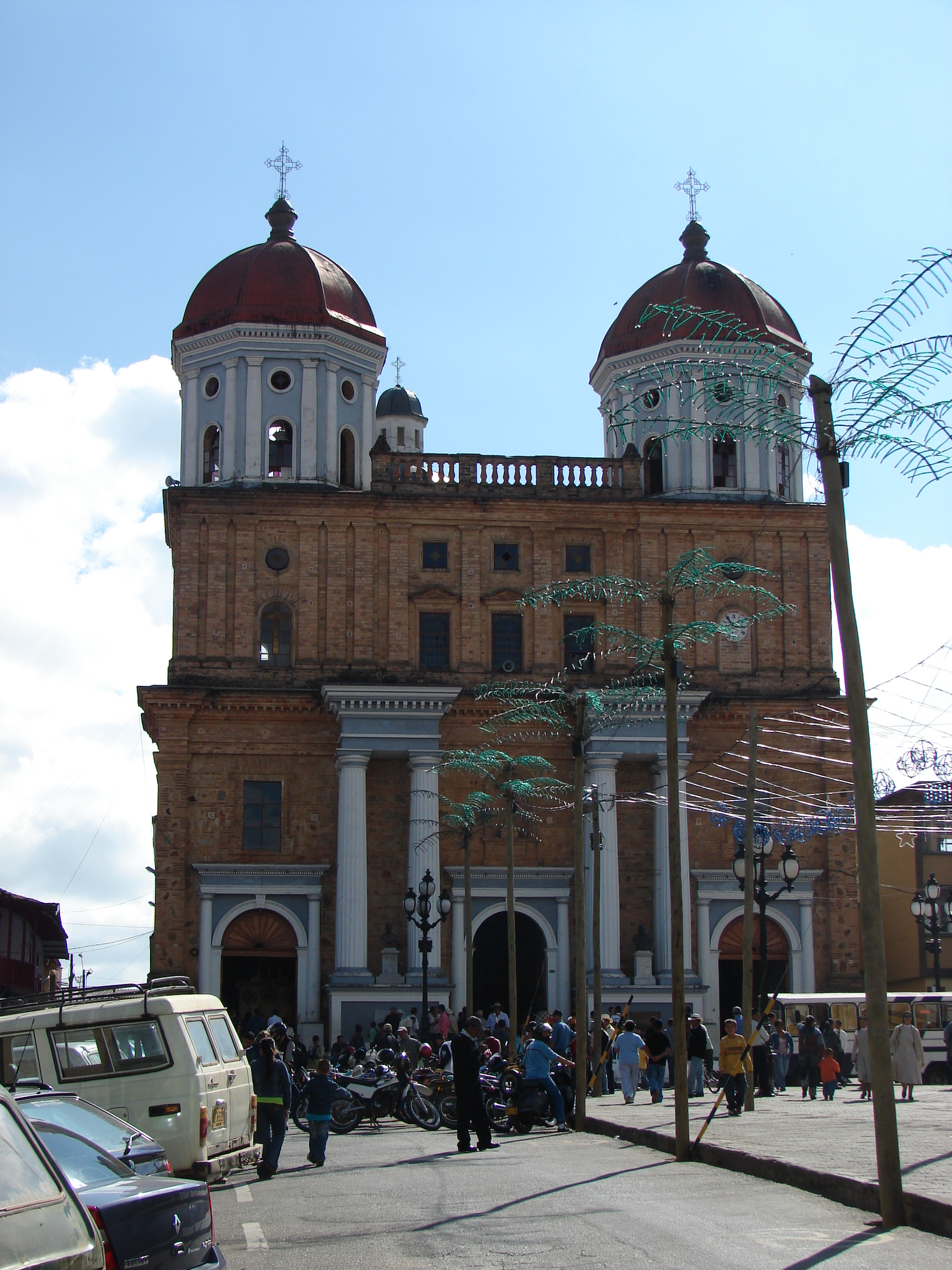
Cathedral of Our Lady of the Rosary

The Roman Catholic Diocese of Santa Rosa de Osos (Latin: Sanctae Rosae de Osos) is a diocese located in the city of Santa Rosa de Osos in the ecclesiastical province of Santa Fe de Antioquia in Colombia.

== History ==
- 5 February 1917: Established as Diocese of Santa Rosa de Osos from the Diocese of Antioquía

== Special churches ==
- Minor Basilicas:
  - Basílica de Nuestra Señora de las Misericordias, Santa Rosa de Osos
  - Basílica del Señor de los Milagros, San Pedro de los Milagros
  - Basilica of Our Lady of Mercy, Yarumal

== Bishops ==
=== Ordinaries ===
- Maximiliano Crespo Rivera † (7 Feb 1917 – 15 Nov 1923) Appointed, Archbishop of Popayán
- Miguel Ángel Builes Gómez † (27 May 1924 – 29 Sep 1971) Died
- Joaquín García Ordóñez † (29 Sep 1971 – 10 Jun 1995) Retired
- Jairo Jaramillo Monsalve (10 Jun 1995 – 13 Nov 2010) Appointed, Archbishop of Barranquilla
- Jorge Alberto Ossa Soto (15 Jul 2011 – 15 Oct 2019) Appointed, Archbishop of Nueva Pamplona
- Elkin Fernando Álvarez Botero (22 Oct 2020 – 8 Jul 2023) Died
- Luis Albeiro Maldonado Monsalve (since 10 Apr 2025)

=== Other priest of this diocese who became bishop ===
- Farly Yovany Gil Betancur, appointed Bishop of Montelibano in 2020

== See also ==
- Roman Catholicism in Colombia
