= Marulanda, Caldas =

- Municipality and town
- Flag Coat of arms

- Location of the municipality and town of Marulanda, Caldas in the Caldas Department of Colombia.

- Location in Colombia
- Coordinates: 5°17′3″N 75°15′37″W
- Country: Colombia
- Department: Caldas Department
- Time zone: UTC-5 (Colombia Standard Time)

Marulanda is a town and municipality in the Colombian Department of Caldas.

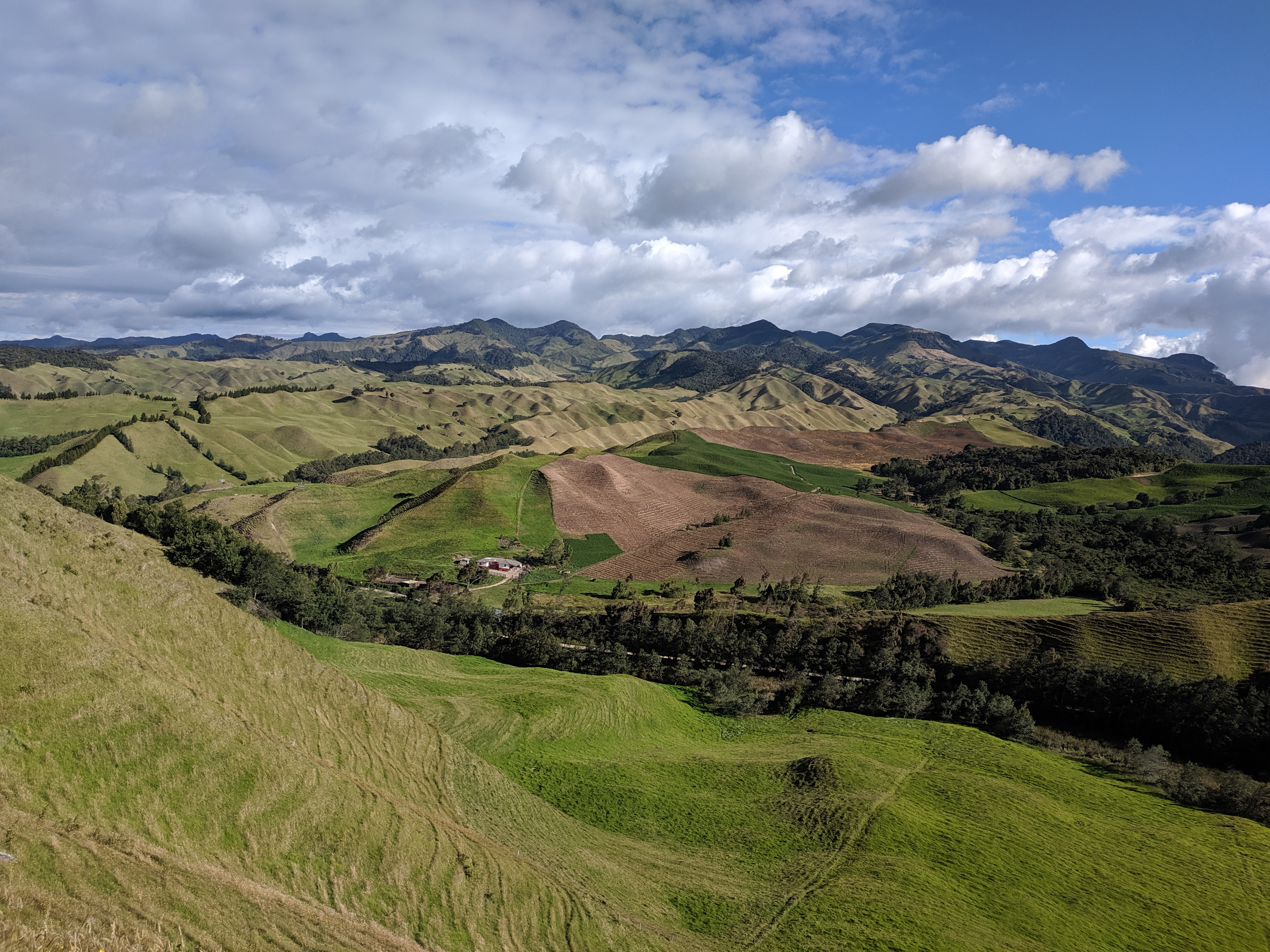
Birth of river Guarinó in Vereda Páramo
