= Ramón Mantilla Duarte =

Roman Catholic bishop

Ramón Mantilla Duarte C.Ss.R.
- Bishop of Ipiales
- Church: Catholic Church
- Diocese: Diocese of Ipiales
- In office: 25 October 1985 – 16 January 1987
- Predecessor: Alonso Arteaga Yepes
- Successor: Gustavo Martínez Frías
- Previous posts: Bishop of Garzón (1977-1985); Titular Bishop of Oppidum Consilinum (1971-1977); Vicar Apostolic of Sibundoy (1971-1977)

Orders
- Ordination: 8 February 1948
- Consecration: 13 March 1971 by Angelo Palmas

Personal details
- Born: 17 July 1925 Piedecuesta, Santander Department, Colombia
- Died: 16 March 2009 (aged 83)

Ramón Mantilla Duarte C.Ss.R. (17 July 1925 in Piedecuesta – 16 March 2009) was the Colombian bishop of the Roman Catholic Diocese of Ipiales from 25 October 1985 until 16 January 1987.

Mantilla Duarte died on 16 March 2009, at the age of 83.
