= Néstor Botero Goldsworthy =

Colombian journalist, writer and merchant

- Born: Néstor Botero Goldsworthy; 27 July 1919; Argelia de María, Colombia
- Died: 6 January 1996 (aged 76); Medellín, Colombia
- Occupations: Journalist; Writer; Merchant
- Title: Manager of the Pasto Chamber of Commerce; Member of the Academies of History of Antioquia and Valle del Cauca; Director of the newspaper La Acción; President of the Sonsón History Center
- Spouse: Mercedes Giraldo Jaramillo
- Children: 6
- Parents: Mauricio Botero; Amalia Goldsworthy
- Awards: Civics Medal (Public Improvement Society of Sonsón, 1964)

Néstor Botero Goldsworthy (Argelia de María, July 27, 1919 – Medellín, January 6, 1996), was a Colombian journalist, writer and merchant.

== Biography ==
=== Early years ===
He was born in the then Argelia district of the municipality of Sonsón, as the son of a married couple made up of Mauricio Botero and Amalia Goldsworthy.

Shortly after he was born, his family moved to the urban center of Sonsón, where he began his studies at the local public school, and later at other institutions such as the School of the Hermanos Escolapios, the Sucre School and the Sonsón School.

His love of writing began at the age of 17 in the company of Gonzalo Cadavid Uribe, in a publication called Excelsior, and collaborating in parallel with the newspaper La Acción. In 1941, he joined the Pro-Interest Committee of Sonsón, in order to help in civic activity. On March 31, 1948, he married Mercedes Giraldo Jaramillo, with whom he had 6 children.

=== Professional life ===
Being aware of the limited professional panorama that his hometown offered, he settled in Medellín to work in the SFK commercial house, where he stayed for a few months after which he traveled to Bogotá to join the Quesada chocolate factory, where he worked for a few years.

Later, he obtained a job in Pasto as manager of the textile agency of the Colombian Trade Company, for which he moved to that city. There he became vice president of the Municipal Council, president of the Chamber of Commerce and of Club Colombia.

Due to his great fondness for history, he was appointed corresponding member of the Valle del Cauca History Academy in 1955. In 1956 he returned to Medellín, continuing as an employee of the Colombian Trade Company. In order to be more closely linked with his hometown, he became Councilor of Sonsón in two periods and of Argelia in one, being the latter municipality recently emancipated of Sonsón. In turn, he enrolled in the Sonsón Public Improvement Society, collaborated with the Manizales newspaper La Patria and as a philanthropist for charity organizations in Medellín.

In 1961, he expressed his support for the regional integration of the municipalities of southern Antioquia to manage progress works, and after the earthquake of July 30, 1962, he promoted the creation of the Sonsón pro-reconstruction Foundation. On January 19, 1963, he was appointed director of the newspaper La Acción.

For his civic services to the city, on February 15, 1964, the Public Improvement Society awarded him the Civics Medal; in April of that same year, he began his participation in the pro-Cathedral Board, to rebuild the Cathedral of Sonsón, destroyed by the 1962 earthquake.

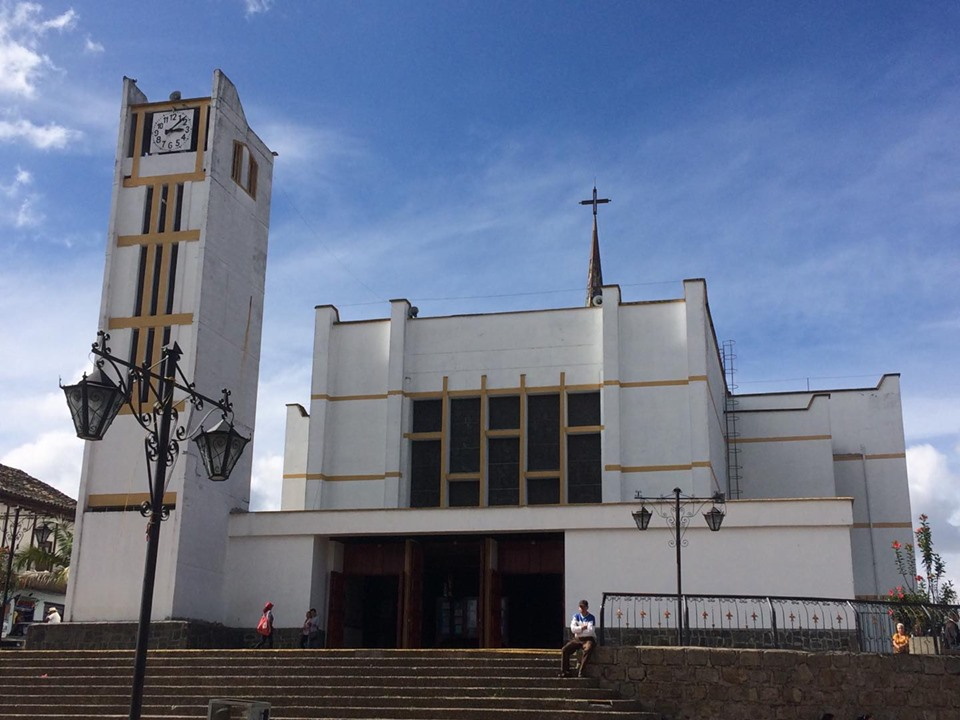
Botero participated in the reconstruction project of the Cathedral of Sonsón, Antioquia, Colombia, which was destroyed during the 1962 earthquake.

At the end of 1969 he was admitted as a member of the Antioquia Academy of History, and in January 1970 he collaborated with the creation of the "Roberto Jaramillo Arango" House of Culture. In 1971, he managed the transfer of the remains of the poet Monsignor Roberto Jaramillo Arango and the Heroine of Salamina, María Martínez de Nisser, back to Sonsón.

In his work as a philanthropist, he donated sums of money for the construction of houses for the Society of Saint Vincent de Paul, and for the adaptation of the tourist hotel of the Society for Public Improvements of Sonsón.

In his work as president of the History Center, created in 1971, he promoted its integration with the rest of the department and the publication of numerous books on local historiography. In 1978 he founded the magazine Pregón, as an informative organ of the History Center, which he directed until his death in 1996.

== See also ==
- Argelia, Antioquia
- Sonsón
