= St Julian's Church, Argelia =

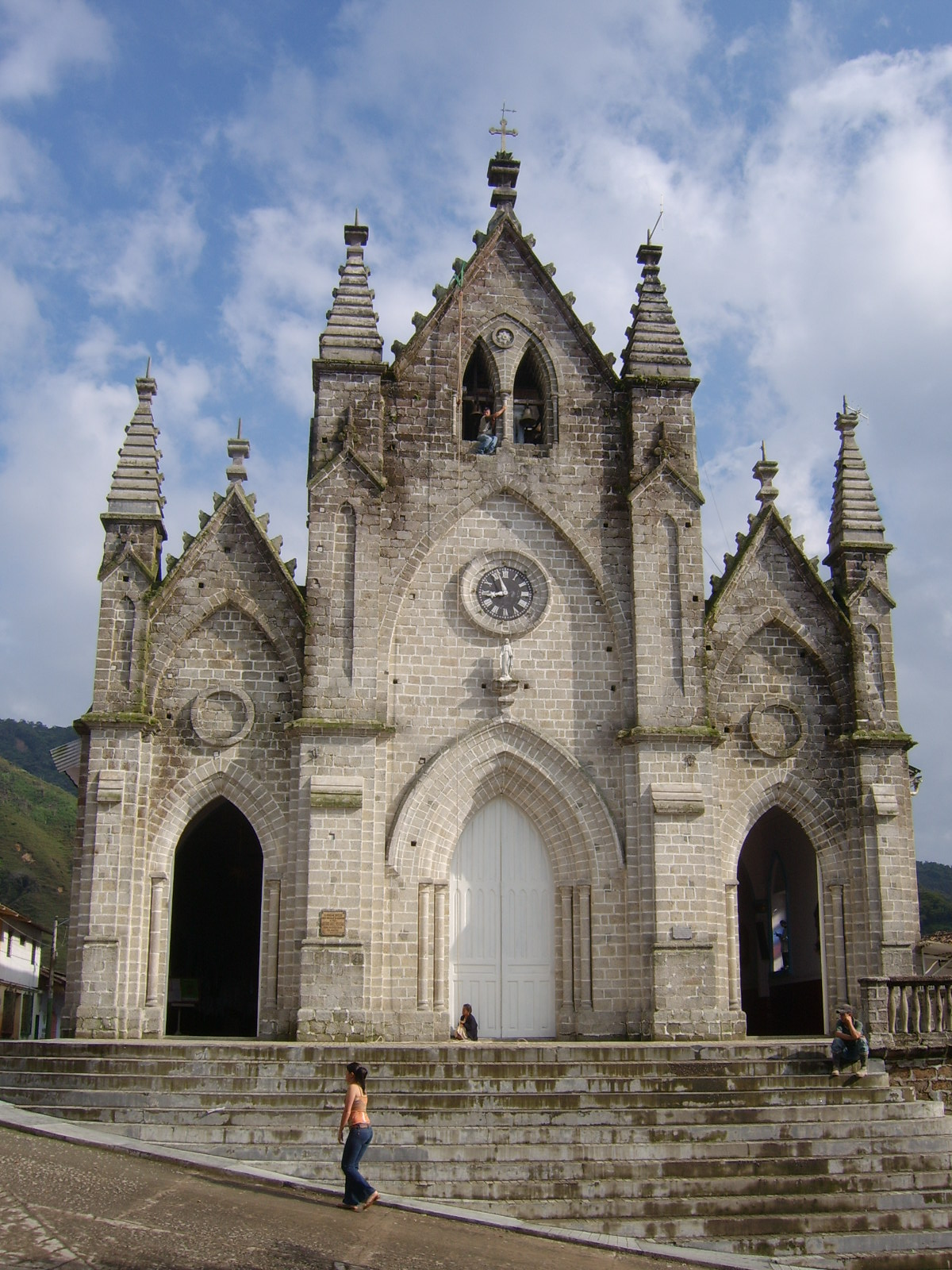
St Julian's Church.

St. Julian's Church (Spanish: Iglesia de San Julián) is a gothic revival church in Argelia, Antioquia, Colombia, dedicated to Julian of Cuenca. The church is part of the Roman Catholic Diocese of Sonsón–Rionegro.

== History ==
In 1902, the Bishop of Medellín, Joaquín Pardo Vergara, created the St. Julian vice-parish (Spanish: Viceparroquia de san Julián), which had approximately 3,000 inhabitants and a simple straw chapel, built by the Sonsón's priest, Daniel Florencio Sánchez, with the help of the parishioners. On June 26 of the same year, Juan Manuel Contreras was appointed as vice-parson. The vice-parish was created as a part of the parish of Sonsón.

On July 29, 1903, Pardo Vergara made a pastoral visit, during which he authorized the parson to present some unused ornaments to the vice-parish, including a harmonium, the first in Argelia, played by the young Nacianceno Ramírez Pavas, future organist of the Metropolitan Cathedral of Medellín for more than 40 years.

One of the first goals of Contreras, was to build a church capable of accommodating all the parishioners. He requested the permission of the prelate, which was granted. A directive assembly was created, with Contreras as the president, Nazario López as vice-president, Vicente Flórez as treasurer, Primitivo Giraldo as secretary, and Críspulo Alzate as councilman, the same post of Ramón María Toro. On August 23, 1903, the first stone was laid, in the presence of Abel María Naranjo, parson of Abejorral, Isaac Ángel, co-assistant of Sonsón, and Isaac Cardona, parson of Aquitania.

Argelia was visited by the Archbishop Manuel José Caicedo on August 28, 1907, the first prelate visiting the vice-parish. By the time of his visit, the church was not initiated, except the "tapias" (walls), because the people had prioritised building the curate's home. Caicedo encouraged the inhabitants of the village to contribute money or time to the building of the church as a priority.

Towards the middle of 1911, with Contreras still the vice-parson, Archbishop Caicedo made a second pastoral visit.

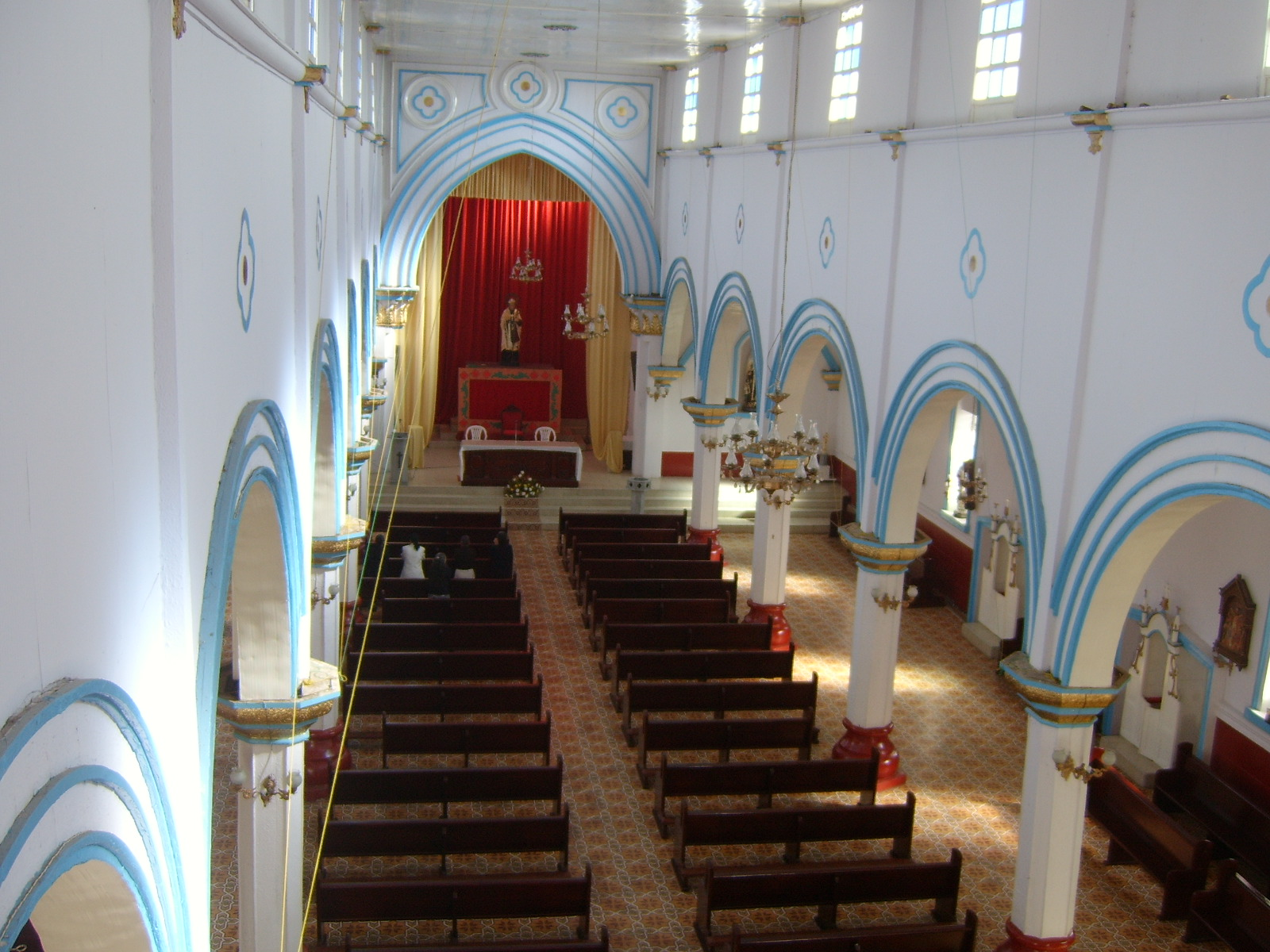
Nave.

On the suggestion of the parson of Sonsón, Tiberio de Jesús Salazar y Herrera (future archbishop of Medellín), Caicedo promoted Contreras to co-assistant on April 25, 1913, but he died on July 6 of the same year. Alzate, who designed the first emplacement of Argelia, was the director of the construction, and in August 1918, the archbishop created the parish of Argelia, mediating his own decree. On April 29, 1923, the main facade was started using granite, mined from a nearby quarry at the direction of Juan de Dios Díaz. On March 13, 1927, the facade was almost finished, and the inside had a main altar.

In 1937, Vargas was removed and Alberto Londoño was named as his replacement. Londoño was the parson for nearly seven years and replaced the old doors, and the brick floor was replaced with tiles. A clock was also added, bought for $ 180. The clock had previously been the property of Sonsón's church, and later, part of the Chapel of Jesus (Spanish: Capilla de Jesús), whose chaplain was Ramón Elías Botero.

Londoño was replaced by Mario Ángel, and he by Antonio Ángel in 1956. Antonio Ángel bought the via crucis, the lamps and the candelabras. On March 18, 1957, the Diocese of Sonsón was created (today, the Diocese of Sonsón-Rionegro), and the parish became a part of the new diocese.
