= José Agustín Valbuena Jáuregui =

Colombian Roman Catholic bishop (1927–2024)

His Excellency José Agustín Valbuena Jáuregui
- Bishop Emeritus of Valledupar
- Metropolis: Barranquilla
- Appointed: 9 September 1977
- Term ended: 10 June 2003
- Predecessor: Vicente Roig y Villalba
- Successor: Oscar José Vélez Isaza

Orders
- Ordination: 20 November 1949 by Pedro María Rodríguez Andrade
- Consecration: 25 October 1977 by Eduardo Martínez Somalo

Personal details
- Born: 20 May 1927 Facatativá, Colombia
- Died: 24 March 2024 (aged 96) Silvania, Colombia

José Agustín Valbuena Jáuregui (20 May 1927 – 24 March 2024) was a Colombian Roman Catholic bishop who was bishop of the Roman Catholic Diocese of Valledupar from 1977 to 2003. Born in Facatativá on 20 May 1927, he died in Silvania on 24 March 2024, at the age of 96.

Catholic Church titles
Preceded by Vicente Roig y Villalba	Bishop of Valledupar; 1977–2003	Succeeded by Oscar José Vélez Isaza
