= Jairo Jaramillo Monsalve =

Colombian Roman Catholic archbishop (born 1940)

The Most Reverend Jairo Jaramillo Monsalve
- Archbishop emeritus of Barranquilla
- Church: Catholic Church
- See: Barranquilla
- Appointed: 13 November 2010
- Installed: 11 December 2010
- Term ended: 14 November 2017
- Predecessor: Rubén Salazar Gómez
- Successor: Pablo Emiro Salas Anteliz
- Previous posts: Bishop of Riohacha (1988–1995); Bishop of Santa Rosa de Osos (1995–2010)

Orders
- Ordination: 26 July 1966 by Alfredo Rubio Díaz
- Consecration: 9 September 1988 by Alfonso Uribe Jaramillo

Personal details
- Born: 2 December 1940 (age 85) Rionegro, Antioquia, Colombia
- Motto: Omnia omnibus factus
- Coat of arms

Jairo Jaramillo Monsalve (born 2 December 1940) is a Colombian Roman Catholic prelate who served as archbishop of Barranquilla from 2010 to 2017. He previously served as the first diocesan bishop of Riohacha from 1988 to 1995 and as bishop of Santa Rosa de Osos from 1995 to 2010.

== Early life and education ==
Jaramillo Monsalve was born in Rionegro, in the department of Antioquia, Colombia, on 2 December 1940. He studied philosophy at the Major Seminary of Medellín and theology at the Pontifical Xavierian University in Bogotá. He was ordained a priest for the Diocese of Sonsón-Rionegro on 26 July 1966.

Following his ordination, he served in several pastoral positions in Rionegro, including as a cooperating vicar at the parish of San Nicolás and as assistant and coordinator of pastoral ministry at the parish of Espíritu Santo. He later served as parish priest of the Cathedral of Rionegro and as vicar general of the Diocese of Sonsón-Rionegro.

== Episcopal ministry ==
=== Bishop of Riohacha ===
On 16 July 1988, Pope John Paul II appointed Jaramillo Monsalve as the first bishop of the newly established Diocese of Riohacha. He received episcopal consecration on 9 September 1988. The Acta Apostolicae Sedis records the establishment and episcopal appointment in 1988.

His principal consecrator was Bishop Alfonso Uribe Jaramillo, bishop of Sonsón-Rionegro, with Bishop Óscar Ángel Bernal of Girardota and Bishop Livio Reginaldo Fischione, O.F.M. Cap., serving as principal co-consecrators.

Jaramillo Monsalve remained bishop of Riohacha until 1995. The Diocese of Riohacha identifies him as its first bishop following its elevation from an apostolic vicariate in 1988.

=== Bishop of Santa Rosa de Osos ===
On 10 June 1995, John Paul II appointed Jaramillo Monsalve bishop of the Diocese of Santa Rosa de Osos. He took possession of the diocese on 13 July 1995.

During his episcopate in Santa Rosa de Osos, Jaramillo Monsalve promoted pastoral renewal and educational initiatives. Among the institutions associated with his ministry was the Fundación Universitaria Católica del Norte, which was founded in 1997. The Episcopal Conference of Colombia has also highlighted his role in the founding of the Universidad Católica de Oriente and his support for the development of the Catholic university project in the Caribbean region.

=== Archbishop of Barranquilla ===
On 13 November 2010, Pope Benedict XVI appointed Jaramillo Monsalve metropolitan archbishop of Barranquilla, succeeding Rubén Salazar Gómez. The appointment was announced by the Holy See on the same date.

He was installed as archbishop on 11 December 2010.

As archbishop, Jaramillo Monsalve emphasized pastoral work, social transformation, education and assistance to poorer communities. The Colombian Episcopal Conference described these concerns as central features of his ministry in Barranquilla and noted his particular attention to the poor, young people and educational initiatives.

=== Retirement ===
Having reached the canonical retirement age, Jaramillo Monsalve submitted his resignation from the pastoral government of the Archdiocese of Barranquilla. On 14 November 2017, Pope Francis accepted his resignation and appointed Pablo Emiro Salas Anteliz, then bishop of Armenia, as his successor.

Jaramillo Monsalve subsequently became archbishop emeritus of Barranquilla.

== Pastoral priorities and legacy ==
His educational initiatives have included the establishment of the Fundación Universitaria Católica del Norte in 1997 and involvement in the development of other Catholic higher-education institutions in Colombia.
