= Apostolic Vicariate of Goajira =

The Apostolic Vicariate of Goajira was a Roman Catholic missionary pre-diocesan jurisdiction on the Guajira Peninsula in Colombia. It was exempt, i.e. directly subject to the Holy See, not part of any ecclesiastical province.

== History ==
The mission of Goajira, a territory split from the Roman Catholic Diocese of Santa Marta, was erected by Pope Pius X on 17 January 1905, as an Apostolic vicariate, dependent on the Roman Congregation for Extraordinary Ecclesiastical Affairs. Mgr. Attanasio Maria Vincenzo Soler-Royo, O.F.M. Cap., was appointed as first apostolic vicar on 18 April 1907. The Capuchins, who were in charge of the Catholic missions, have had a great influence over the natives, and large numbers have been converted.

On 4 December 1952, it was suppressed and its territory divided to establish the Apostolic Vicariate of Riohacha and the Apostolic Vicariate of Valledupar (now both suffragan dioceses of the Metropolitan Roman Catholic Archdiocese of Barranquilla).

== Incumbent Ordinaries ==
Apostolic Vicars of Goajira

(All Latin Church missionaries of the Capuchins order and titular bishops)

- Atanasio María Vicente Soler y Royo, Titular Bishop of Citharizum (1906.12.22 – 1930.11.21)
- Joaquín Alcaide y Bueso, Titular Bishop of Castoria (1931.12.15 – 1943.02.21)
- Vicente Roig y Villalba, Titular Bishop of Arad (1944.12.15 – 1952.12.04); later first Apostolic Vicar of daughter vicariate Valledupar (1952.12.04 – 1969.04.25)

== See also ==
- Roman Catholicism in Colombia
