= Diocese of Magangué =

Diocese of the Catholic Church in Colombia

Diocese of Magangué Dioecesis Maganguensis

Catholic

Location
- Country: Colombia
- Ecclesiastical province: Cartagena

Statistics
- Area: 20,165 km^{2} (7,786 sq mi)
- Population: Total; Catholics: (as of 2014); 838,000; 677,000 (80.7%)

Information
- Rite: Latin Rite
- Established: 25 April 1969 (57 years ago)
- Cathedral: Catedral Nuestra Señora de La Candelaria

Current leadership
- Pope: Leo XIV
- Bishop: Ariel Lascarro Tapia
- Metropolitan Archbishop: Jorge Enrique Jiménez Carvajal, C.I.M.
- Bishops emeritus: Jorge Leonardo Gómez Serna, O.P.

Map

Website
- www.diocesismagangue.org

The Roman Catholic Diocese of Magangué (Latin: Maganguensis) is a diocese located in the city of Magangué in the ecclesiastical province of Cartagena in Colombia.

== History ==
- 25 April 1969: Established as Diocese of Magangué from the Metropolitan Archdiocese of Cartagena

== Ordinaries ==
- Eloy Tato Losada, I.E.M.E. (1969.04.25 – 1994.05.31)
- Armando Larios Jiménez (1994.05.31 – 2001.03.08) Appointed, Bishop of Riohacha
- Jorge Leonardo Gómez Serna, O.P. (2001.11.03 – 2012.07.30)
- Ariel Lascarro Tapia (21 November 2014 - )

== See also ==
- Roman Catholicism in Colombia
