= Diocese of El Banco =

Diocese of the Catholic Church in Colombia

Coordinates: 8.9927°N 73.9694°W

Diocese of El Banco Dioecesis Bancoënsis Diócesis de El Banco

Catholic
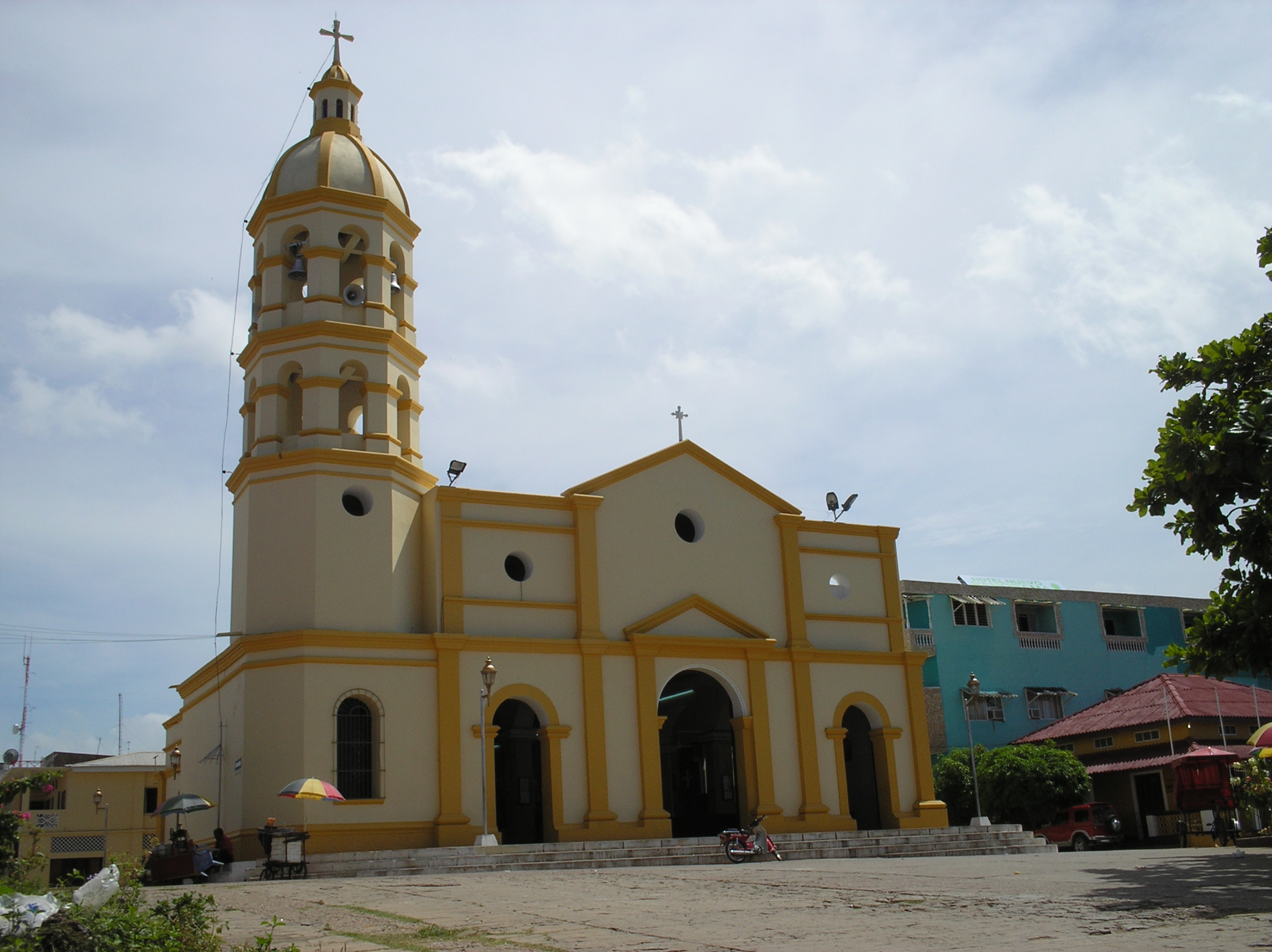
- Cathedral in El Banco

Location
- Country: Colombia
- Ecclesiastical province: Barranquilla
- Metropolitan: Barranquilla

Statistics
- Area: 11,855 km^{2} (4,577 sq mi)
- Population: Total; Catholics: (as of 2006); 389,641; 334,000 (85.7%)

Information
- Denomination: Catholic Church
- Rite: Latin Rite
- Established: 17 January 2006 (20 years ago)
- Cathedral: Cathedral of Our Lady of La Candelaria in El Banco

Current leadership
- Pope: Leo XIV
- Bishop: Dimas Acuña Jiménez
- Metropolitan Archbishop: Pablo Emiro Salas Anteliz

Map

The Roman Catholic Diocese of El Banco (Latin: Bancoënsis) is a diocese located in the town of El Banco in the ecclesiastical province of Barranquilla in Colombia.

== History ==
- 17 January 2006: Established as Diocese of El Banco from the Diocese of Santa Marta and Diocese of Valledupar

== Ordinaries ==
- Jaime Enrique Duque Correa, M.X.Y. (17 January 2006 – 14 April 2013)
- Luis Gabriel Ramírez Díaz (18 June 2014 – 8 January 2023), appointed Bishop of Ocaña
  - Apostolic Administrator José Mario Bacci Trespalacios, C.I.M. (17 January 2023 – 9 September 2024)
- Dimas Acuña Jiménez (15 May 2024 – Present)

== See also ==
- Roman Catholicism in Colombia
