= Armando Larios Jiménez =

Colombian Catholic priest (1951–2021)

- Bishop of Riohacha
- Church: Catholic Church
- Diocese: Diocese of Riohacha
- In office: 8 March 2001 – 5 June 2004
- Predecessor: Gilberto Jiménez Narváez
- Successor: Héctor Ignacio Salah Zuleta
- Previous post: Bishop of Magangué (1994-2001)

Orders
- Ordination: 14 August 1976
- Consecration: 24 July 1994 by Félix María Torres Parra

Personal details
- Born: 21 May 1951 Barranquilla, Atlántico Department, Colombia
- Died: 22 July 2021 (aged 70) Monterrey, Nuevo León, Mexico

Armando Larios Jiménez (21 May 1951 – 22 July 2021) was a Colombian Roman Catholic prelate and priest. He served as the Bishop of the Roman Catholic Diocese of Magangué from 1994 to 2001 and the Bishop of the Roman Catholic Diocese of Riohacha from 2001 to 2004.

Born in Barranquilla in 1951, Armando Larios Jiménez died of a heart attack in Monterrey, Mexico, on 22 July 2021, at the age of 70.
