= Voncariana =

Voncariana (in Latin: Dioecesis Voncarianensis) was an ancient Roman–Berber civitas in the province of Mauretania Caesariensis. Its stone ruins are located at Boghasi in modern Algeria.

Voncariana was a former was a Christian diocese of the Roman Catholic Church. The site of the cathedra of Voncariana is unknown.

Only one bishop from ancient Voncariana is known, Victor, who was among the Catholic bishops who attended a synod in Carthage in 484 AD called by the Vandal King Huneric .

Voncariana survives as a titular bishopric. The current bishop is Victor Antonio Tamayo Betancourt, auxiliary bishop of Barranquilla.

== Known bishops ==
- Vittore (fl.484)
- Luigi Bellotti (1964–1995)
- Óscar Aníbal Salazar Gómez (1995–1999)
- Leonard Paul Blair (1999–2003)
- Victor Antonio Tamayo Betancourt (2003–present)
