= Chapel of Our Lady of Chiquinquirá =

Chapel of Our Lady of Chiquinquirá of La Ceja
- Capilla de Nuestra Señora de Chiquinquirá de La Ceja
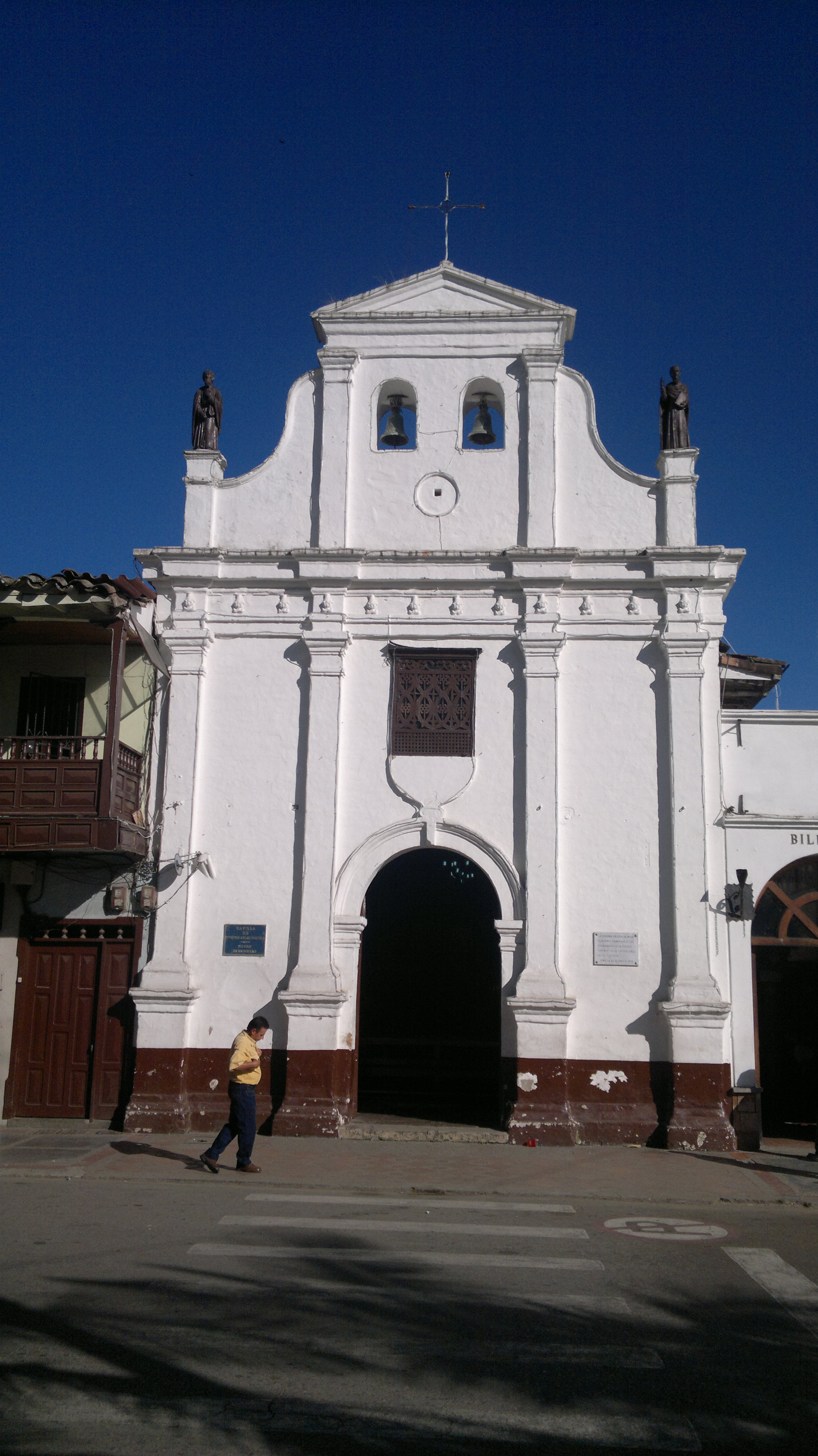
- Chapel of Our Lady of Chiquinquirá of La Ceja
- Location: La Ceja, Antioquia, Colombia
- Denomination: Catholic

Architecture
- Style: Colonial

Administration
- Diocese: Roman Catholic Diocese of Sonsón–Rionegro

The Chapel of Our Lady of Chiquinquirá is a temple of Catholic worship, dedicated to the Virgin Mary under the title of Our Lady of Chiquinquirá. It is located in the eastern side of the main square of La Ceja, Colombia, and belongs to the ecclesiastical jurisdiction of the Diocese of Sonsón-Rionegro.

The chapel contains the remains of some prominent Colombian people, such as the poet Gregorio Gutiérrez González and his wife Julia de Isaza, former President Juan de Dios Aranzazu, the first president of Colombia from Antioquia, and political and business leader José María Bernal.

The building has a colonial style, with a singular rectangular nave. It houses a collection of paintings of the sixteenth, seventeenth, and eighteenth centuries, among which include works by the Colombian master Gregorio Vasquez de Arce y Ceballos. For that reason, in 1968, Monsignor Alfonso Uribe Jaramillo, bishop of Sonsón-Rionegro, declared the church a "Temple Museum of Religious Art". On November 2, 1995, the national government also declared it a national monument of Colombia.

== History ==
In 1820, construction of the chapel began on land donated by María Josefa Marulanda. The project was financed by Bárbara Villegas, whose family was devoted to the Virgin Mary of Chiquinquirá. This chapel replaced one that was built in El Hato in the 18th century, which was dedicated to La Chinca and was demolished in 1792. Goods that belonged to the chapels of El Burro, El Hato and Chaparral were brought to this chapel for its endowment.

The bishops of Antioquia, Fray Mariano Garnica y Orjuela, during his first pastoral visit to La Ceja in 1829, ordered that all be moved to the parish church built by Father Mateo Cardona. As a result, the chapel was dismantled and abandoned.

In 1853, due to the expansion of the church of Our Lady of Carmen, worship returned to the chapel for five years.
