= UCO =

UCO may refer to:

== Organizations ==
- Central Operative Unit (Spanish: Unidad Central Operativa), a special unit of the Civil Guard of Spain
- UCO Bank, formerly United Commercial Bank

=== Education ===
- University of Central Oklahoma, Edmond, Oklahoma, US
- University of California Observatories, a multi-campus astronomical research unit of the University of California, US
- University of Colorado system (officially uses the acronym CU)
- Catholic University of the West (Université catholique de l'Ouest), Angers, France
- Universidad Católica de Oriente, Antioquia, Colombia

== Other uses ==
- UCO, female vocalist of the Japanese band Funta
- Unequal crossing over, a DNA mutation mechanism
- Used cooking oil
