= Universidad Católica de Oriente =

Private university located in Rionegro, Antioquia

Coordinates: 6.15045°N 75.36634°W

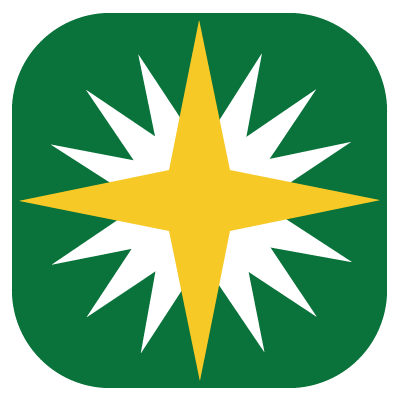
- Motto: Veritati per fidem et scientiam
- Motto in English: To the truth by faith and science
- Type: Private university
- Established: February 11, 1982; 44 years ago
- Founders: Diocese of Sonsón–Rionegro
- Rector: Elkin de Jesús Narváez Gómez
- Students: 1,842 (2021-2022)
- Location: Rionegro, Antioquia, Colombia
- Campus: Suburban 30 acres (12 ha)
- Colors: Green - White - Yellow
- Nickname: Vulturs
- Mascot: Vultur
- Website: www.uco.edu.co

Universidad Católica de Oriente (UCO) is a private Catholic university in Rionegro, Antioquia. Established in 1982, it is accredited by Ministry of National Education.

The university comprises eight academic faculties: which are the Faculty of Agricultural Sciences, Educational sciences, Health Sciences, Economic and Administrative sciences, Social sciences, Law, Engineering and the Faculty of Theology and Humanities.

== History ==
The statutes of the Universidad de Catolica de Oriente date back to 1982, when Monsignor Alfonso Uribe Jaramillo, bishop of Sonsón-Rionegro, founded the Universidad Catolica de Oriente. counting on the support of the Diocese of Sonson-Rionegro. In 1982, it was officially consolidated as a new higher education institution in Rionegro that would include its school, called Monseñor Alfonso Uribe Jaramillo, abbreviated MAUJ, also located in Rionegro.
