= Eloy Tato Losada =

Roman Catholic bishop (1923–2022)

Eloy Tato Losada, I.E.M.E.
- Bishop of the Diocese of Magangué (emeritus)
- Church: Roman Catholic Church
- See: Roman Catholic Diocese of Magangué
- In office: 1969–1994
- Predecessor: None
- Successor: Armando Larios Jiménez
- Previous post(s): Priest

Orders
- Ordination: 15 June 1946

Personal details
- Born: 6 September 1923; Villadequinta, Galicia, Spain
- Died: 18 January 2022 (aged 98); O Barco de Valdeorras, Spain

Eloy Tato Losada (6 September 1923 – 18 January 2022) was a Spanish-born Colombian prelate of the Catholic Church, participant of the Second Vatican Council and bishop of Magangué between 1969 and 1994.

== Biography ==
Tato Losada was born in Villadequinta, Galicia, Spain. He studied at Astorga seminary and was ordained a priest on 15 June 1946. On 8 October 1952 joined the Mission Seminary in Burgos and in 1953 he devoted himself to the Instituto Español de San Francisco Javier para Misiones Extranjeras order. That year he was appointed Vicar Apostolic of San Jorge, Colombia as well as Titular bishop of Cardicium on 3 May 1960 and ordained a bishop on 25 July 1960. He participated in the four sessions of the Second Vatican Council.

Tato Losada was appointed bishop of Magangué on 25 April 1969. After 25 years, Tato resigned on 31 May 1994 due to health problems. He then returned to Galicia, where he retired in his hometown. He died on 18 January 2022, at the age of 98 in the hospital of O Barco de Valdeorras.
