= Jaime Enrique Duque Correa =

Jaime Enrique Duque Correa M.X.Y.
- Bishop of El Banco
- Church: Catholic Church
- Diocese: Diocese of El Banco
- In office: 17 January 2006 – 14 April 2013
- Predecessor: Diocese erected
- Successor: Luis Gabriel Ramírez Díaz

Orders
- Ordination: 2 July 1967
- Consecration: 25 February 2006 by Beniamino Stella

Personal details
- Born: 4 April 1943 Medellín, Antioquia Department, Colombia
- Died: 14 April 2013 (aged 70) Medellín, Antioquia Department, Colombia

Jaime Enrique Duque Correa (4 April 1943 − 14 April 2013) was a Colombian Roman Catholic.

Ordained to the priesthood on 5 November 1967, Duque Correa was named bishop of the Roman Catholic Diocese of El Banco, Colombia on 17 January 2006 and died on 14 April 2013 while still in office.
