= Luis Gabriel Ramírez Díaz =

Colombian Roman Catholic prelate (1965–2023)

His Excellency Luis Gabriel Ramírez Díaz
- Bishop of Ocaña
- Metropolis: Nueva Pamplona
- Appointed: 27 February 2021
- Term ended: 8 January 2023
- Predecessor: Gabriel Ángel Villa Vahos
- Successor: Vacant
- Previous post: Bishop of El Banco (2014–2021)

Orders
- Ordination: 12 June 1993 by Pope John Paul II
- Consecration: 23 August 2014 by Ettore Balestrero

Personal details
- Born: 14 October 1965 Barranquilla, Colombia
- Died: 8 January 2023 (aged 57) Medellín, Colombia

Luis Gabriel Ramírez Díaz (14 October 1965 – 8 January 2023) was a Colombian Roman Catholic prelate.

Ramírez Díaz was born in Colombia and was ordained to the priesthood in 1993. He served as bishop of the Roman Catholic Diocese of El Banco, Colombia from 2014 to 2021 and as bishop of the Roman Catholic Diocese of Ocaña, Colombia, from 2021 until his death in 2023.

Catholic Church titles
Preceded by Gabriel Ángel Villa Vahos	Bishop of Ocaña; 2021–2022	Succeeded by Vacant
Preceded by Jaime Enrique Duque Correa	Bishop of El Banco; 2014–2021	Succeeded by Vacant
