= Our Lady of Chiquinquirá Cathedral, Sonsón =

Our Lady of Chiquinquirá Cathedral
- Catedral de Nuestra Señora de Chiquinquirá
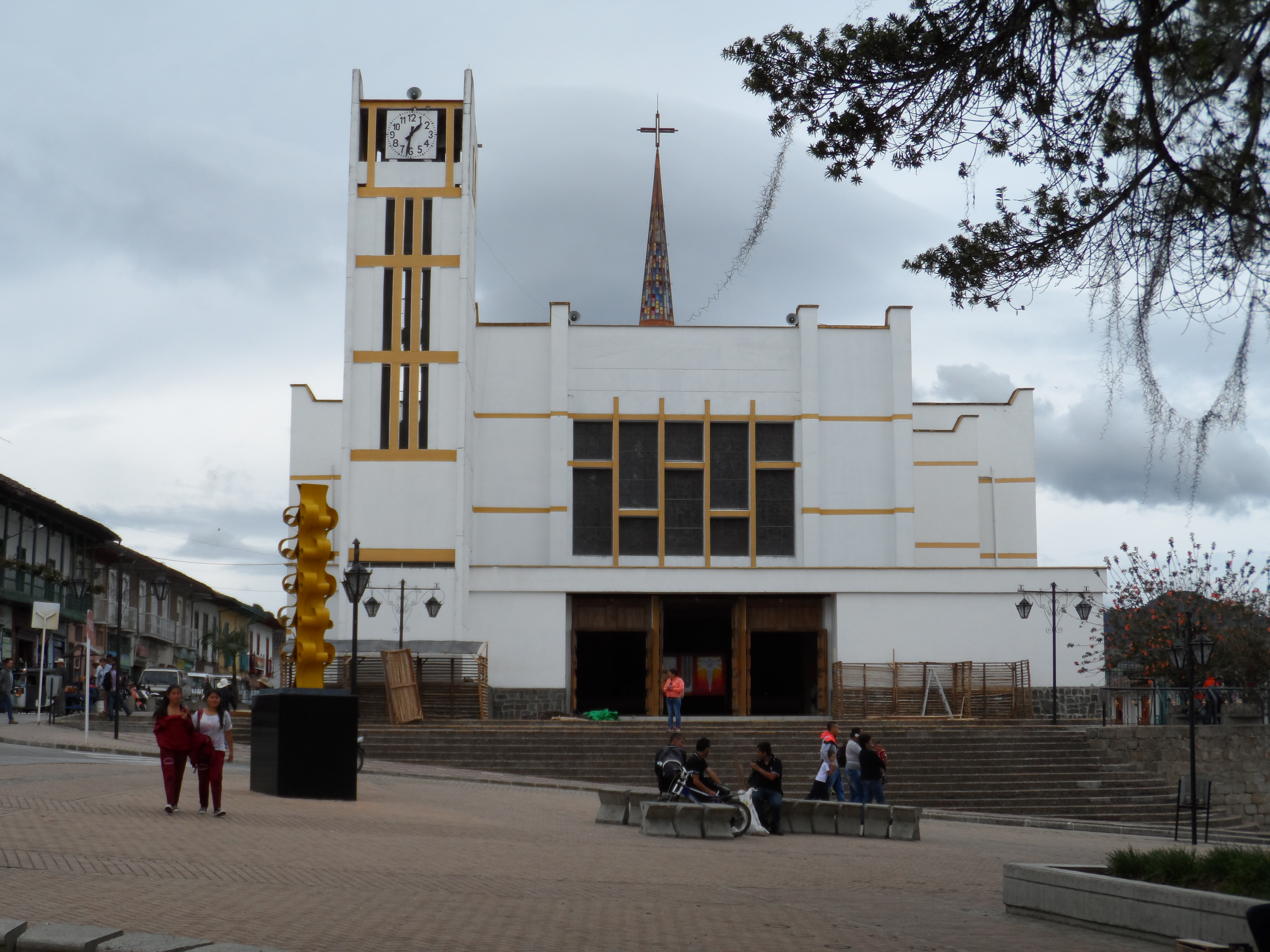
- Our Lady of Chiquinquirá Cathedral
- 5°42′36″N 75°18′39″W
- Location: Sonsón
- Country: Colombia
- Denomination: Roman Catholic Church

Our Lady of Chiquinquirá Cathedral (Spanish: Catedral de Nuestra Señora de Chiquinquirá) is a Roman Catholic cathedral situated in the city of Sonsón, Colombia. The present cathedral was built to replace the original destroyed by an earthquake in 1962.

== History ==
The Our Lady of Chiquinquirá Cathedral, also called Sonsón Cathedral, is a Catholic cathedral under the patronage of the Virgin of Chiquinquirá. The church is situated on the side of the main square (Ruiz Zapata) of the municipality and city of Sonsón, Antioquia, Colombia. It is one of the bishoprics of the Roman Catholic Diocese of Sonsón–Rionegro, together with the co-Cathedral of St. Nicholas the Great, and the Marian shrine in Rionegro.

The current building is contemporary in design and replaced the previous Romanesque-Gothic style granite building, which was demolished after a strong earthquake on July 30, 1962, caused it serious damage.

To carry out the reconstruction of the new temple, the Pro-Cathedral Board was formed to manage the project, taking into account that the selected design was highly avant-garde and dissonant with the traditional environment of the town. One of the promoters of the board for the reconstruction of the temple was the journalist, writer, and merchant Néstor Botero Goldsworthy.

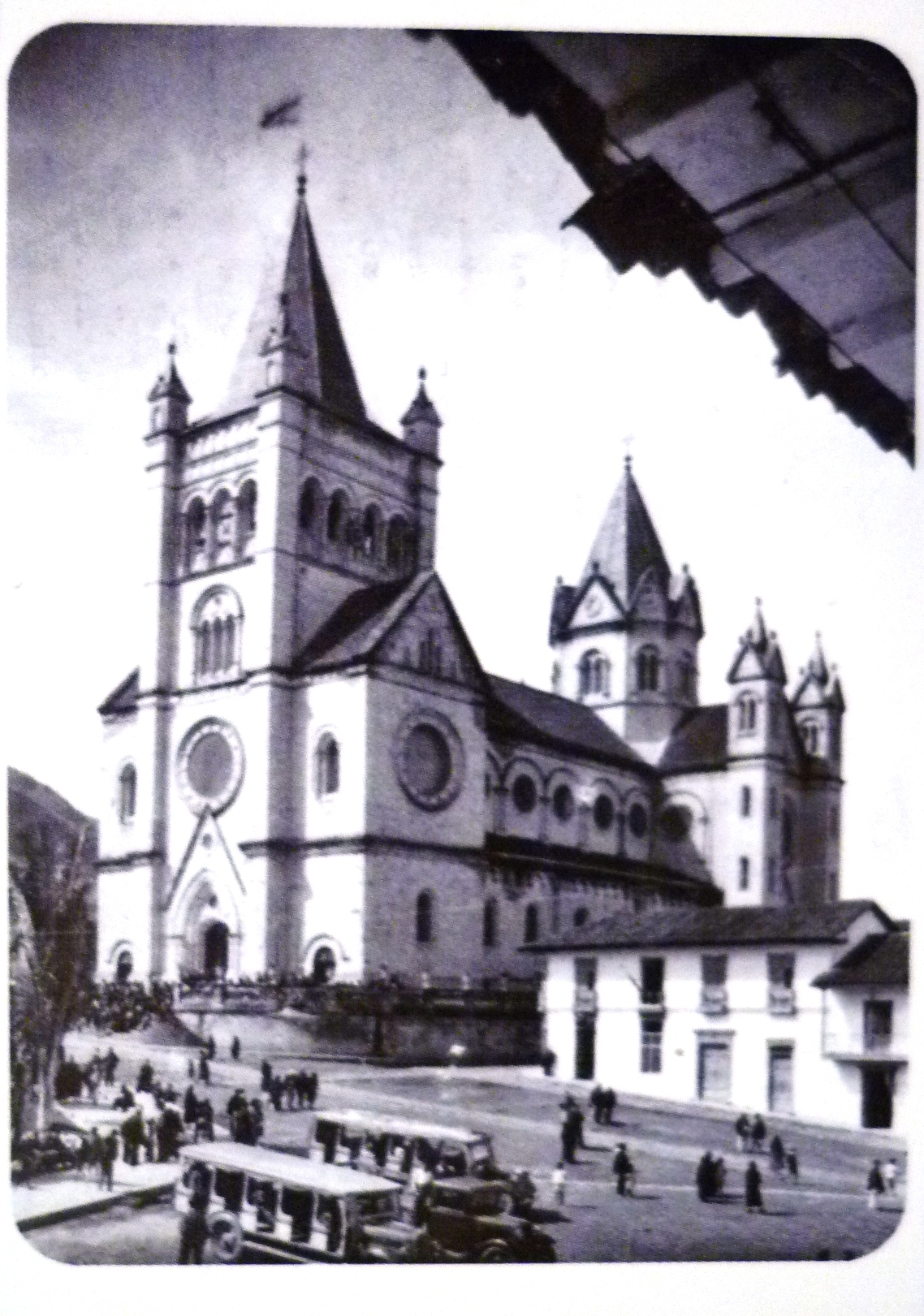
The old cathedral

== See also ==
- Roman Catholicism in Colombia
- Our Lady of Chiquinquirá
