= Diocese of Riohacha =

Diocese of the Catholic Church in Colombia

Coordinates: 11.5442°N 72.9069°W

Diocese of Riohacha Dioecesis Riviascianensis Diócesis de Riohacha

Catholic

Location
- Country: Colombia
- Ecclesiastical province: Barranquilla
- Metropolitan: Barranquilla

Statistics
- Area: 19,037 km^{2} (7,350 sq mi)
- Population: Total; Catholics: (as of 2010); 425,000; 353,000 (83.1%)

Information
- Rite: Latin Rite
- Established: 4 December 1952 (73 years ago)
- Cathedral: Cathedral of Our Lady of Remedies in Riohacha

Current leadership
- Pope: Leo XIV
- Bishop: Francisco Antonio Ceballos Escobar, CSsR
- Metropolitan Archbishop: Pablo Emiro Salas Anteliz
- Bishops emeritus: Héctor Ignacio Salah Zuleta

Map

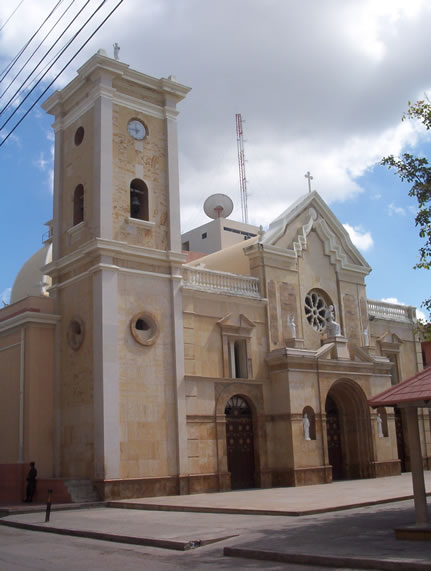
Cathedral of Our Lady of Remedies

The Roman Catholic Diocese of Riohacha (Latin: Riviascianensis) is a diocese located in the city of Riohacha in the ecclesiastical province of Barranquilla in Colombia.

== History ==
- 4 December 1952: Established as Apostolic Vicariate of Riohacha from the Apostolic Vicariate of Goajira
- 16 July 1988: Promoted as Diocese of Riohacha

== Bishops ==
=== Ordinaries ===
- Vicars Apostolic of Riohacha (Roman rite)
  - Bishop Eusebio Septimio Mari, OFMCap (1954.02.21 – 1965.12.21)
  - Bishop Livio Reginaldo Fischione, OFMCap (1966.09.29 – 1988.07.16)
- Bishops of Riohacha (Roman rite)
  - Bishop Jairo Jaramillo Monsalve (1988.07.16 – 1995.06.10), appointed Bishop of Santa Rosa de Osos
  - Bishop Gilberto Jiménez Narváez (1996.07.16 – 2001.03.08), resigned but was soon appointed auxiliary bishop of Medellín
  - Bishop Armando Larios Jiménez (2001.03.08 – 2004.06.05)
  - Bishop Héctor Ignacio Salah Zuleta (2005.05.13 – 2020.04.22)
  - Bishop Francisco Antonio Ceballos Escobar, CSsR (2020.04.22 -)

== See also ==
- Roman Catholicism in Colombia
