= Silvania, Colombia =

Silvania
- Municipality and town
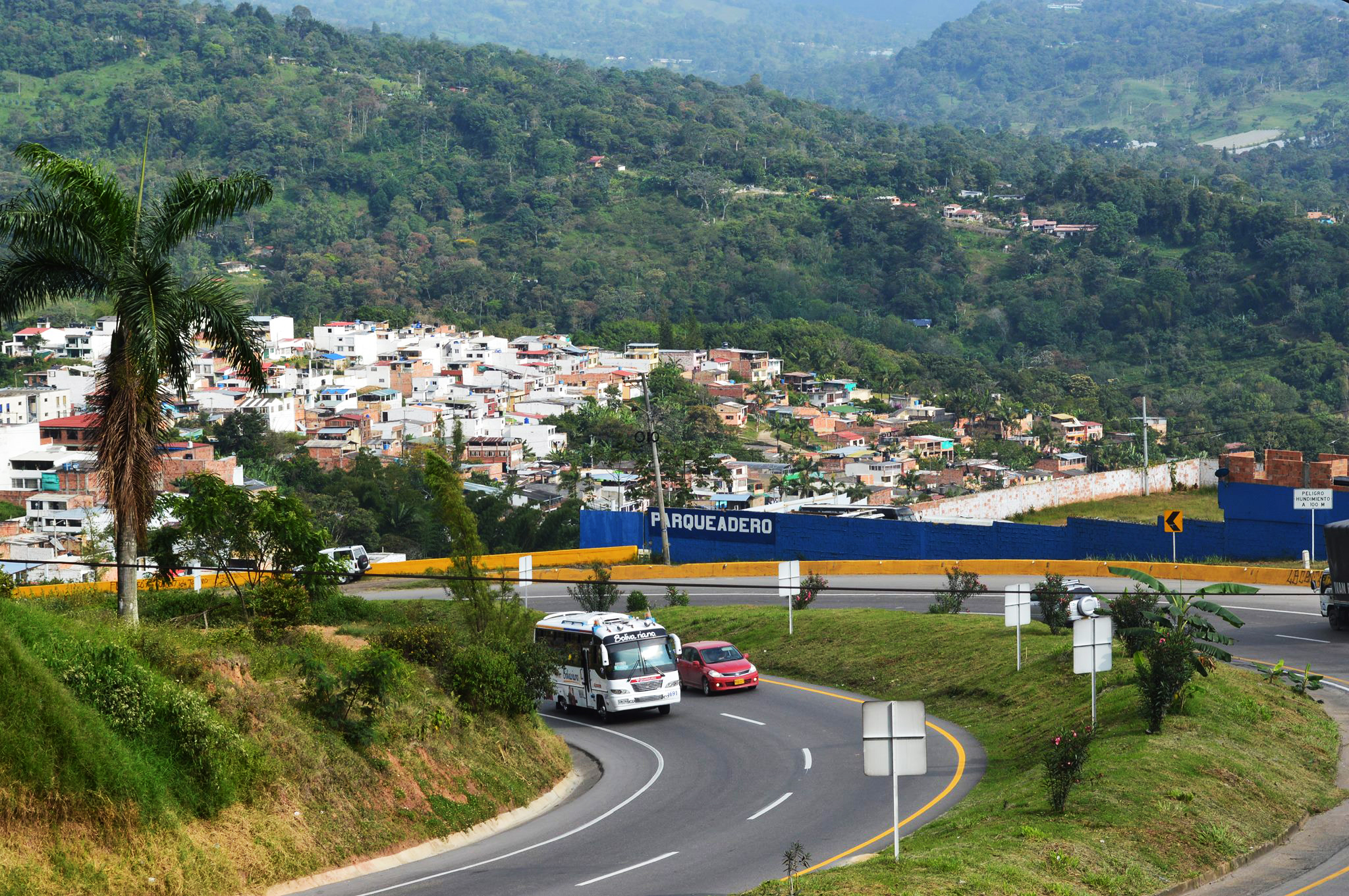
- View of Silvania

- Flag Coat of arms

- Location of the municipality and town inside Cundinamarca Department of Colombia

- Location in Colombia
- Coordinates: 4°24′12″N 74°23′17″W
- Country: Colombia
- Department: Cundinamarca
- Elevation: 1,470 m (4,820 ft)

Population (Census 2018)
  - Total: 20,581
- Time zone: UTC-5 (Colombia Standard Time)

Silvania is a town and municipality in Cundinamarca Department, Colombia.
