= Argelia, Antioquia =

Argelia
- Municipality
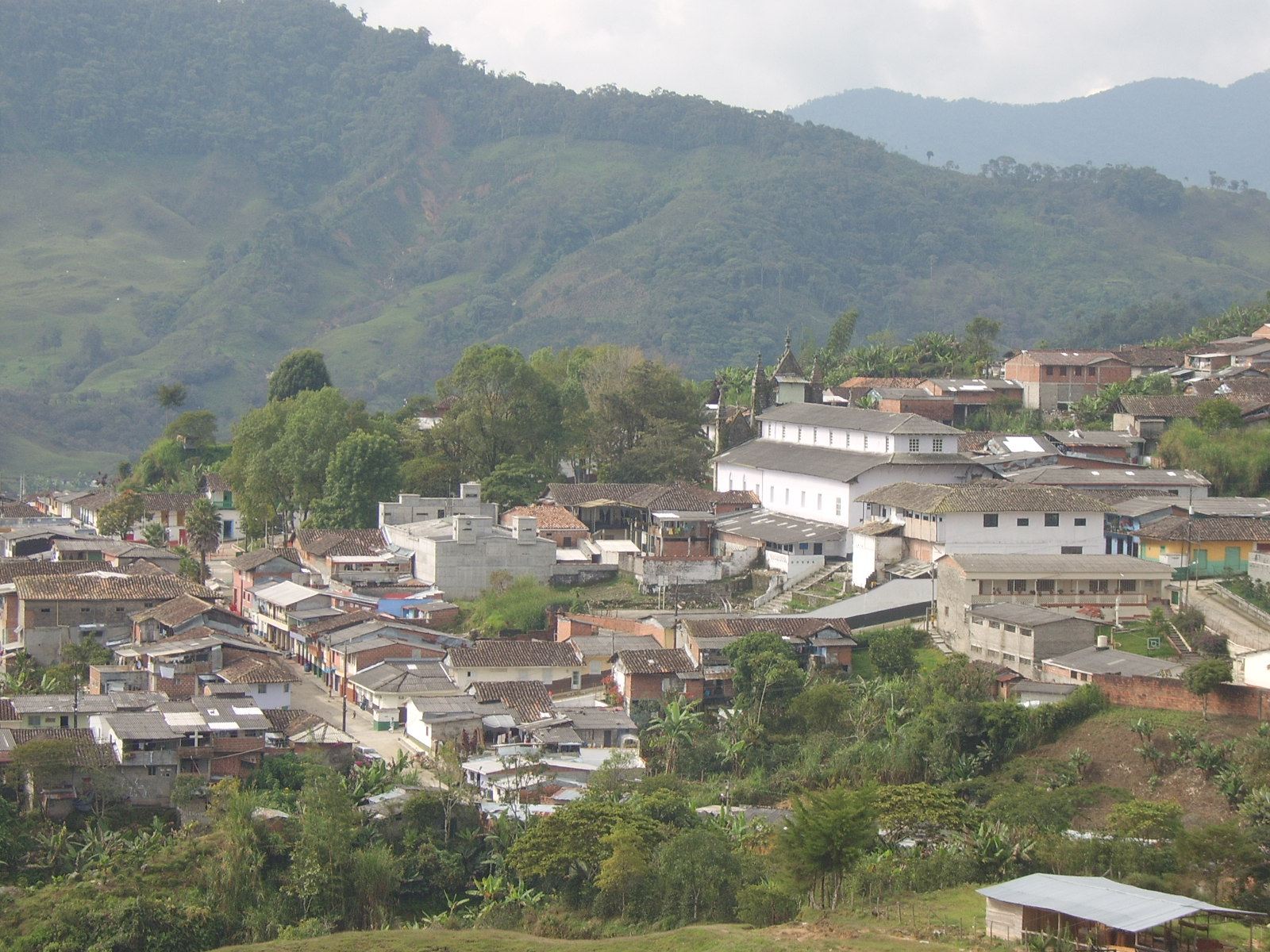

- Flag Coat of arms

- Location of the municipality of Argelia in the Antioquia Department

- Location in Colombia
- Coordinates: 5°44′33″N 75°8′47″W
- Country: Colombia
- Region: Andean Region
- Department: Antioquia Department
- Subregion: Eastern

Area
  - Total: 254 km^{2} (98 sq mi)

Population (2005)
  - Total: 8,911
  - Density: 35.1/km^{2} (90.9/sq mi)

Argelia is a town and municipality in Antioquia Department, Colombia. Part of the subregion of Eastern Antioquia. The population was 8,911 in 2005.

== Climate ==
Argelia has a tropical rainforest climate (Af) which closely borders a subtropical highland climate. It has very heavy rainfall year round.

Climate data for Argelia
Month	Jan	Feb	Mar	Apr	May	Jun	Jul	Aug	Sep	Oct	Nov	Dec	Year
Mean daily maximum °C (°F)	22.8 (73.0)	23.3 (73.9)	23.6 (74.5)	22.8 (73.0)	22.9 (73.2)	23.2 (73.8)	23.5 (74.3)	23.3 (73.9)	23.1 (73.6)	22.2 (72.0)	22.1 (71.8)	22.2 (72.0)	22.9 (73.2)
Daily mean °C (°F)	18.3 (64.9)	18.7 (65.7)	19.1 (66.4)	18.9 (66.0)	18.7 (65.7)	18.7 (65.7)	18.8 (65.8)	18.7 (65.7)	18.5 (65.3)	18.0 (64.4)	18.0 (64.4)	18.1 (64.6)	18.5 (65.4)
Mean daily minimum °C (°F)	13.9 (57.0)	14.2 (57.6)	14.6 (58.3)	14.6 (58.3)	14.9 (58.8)	14.6 (58.3)	14.1 (57.4)	14.1 (57.4)	13.9 (57.0)	13.9 (57.0)	14.0 (57.2)	14.0 (57.2)	14.2 (57.6)
Average rainfall mm (inches)	365.9 (14.41)	400.0 (15.75)	512.6 (20.18)	484.8 (19.09)	477.7 (18.81)	330.0 (12.99)	332.5 (13.09)	324.1 (12.76)	461.4 (18.17)	555.4 (21.87)	564.9 (22.24)	494.4 (19.46)	5,303.7 (208.82)
Average rainy days	24	22	27	26	25	21	19	19	24	27	27	27	288
Source 1:
Source 2:

== See also ==
- St Julian's Church, Argelia
