= Archdiocese of Barranquilla =

Catholic archdiocese in Colombia

Coordinates: 10.9884°N 74.7904°W

Archdiocese of Barranquilla Archidioecesis Barranquillensis Arquidiócesis de Barranquilla

Catholic

Location
- Country: Colombia
- Ecclesiastical province: Barranquilla

Statistics
- Area: 3,319 km^{2} (1,281 sq mi)
- Population: Total; Catholics: (as of 2012); 2,766,000; 2,243,000 (81.1%)

Information
- Rite: Latin Rite
- Established: 7 July 1932 (94 years ago)
- Cathedral: Cathedral of Queen Mary in Barranquilla

Current leadership
- Pope: Leo XIV
- Metropolitan Archbishop: Pablo Emiro Salas Anteliz
- Auxiliary Bishops: Victor Antonio Tamayo Betancourt
- Bishops emeritus: Jairo Jaramillo Monsalve

Map

Website
- www.arquidiocesisbaq.org

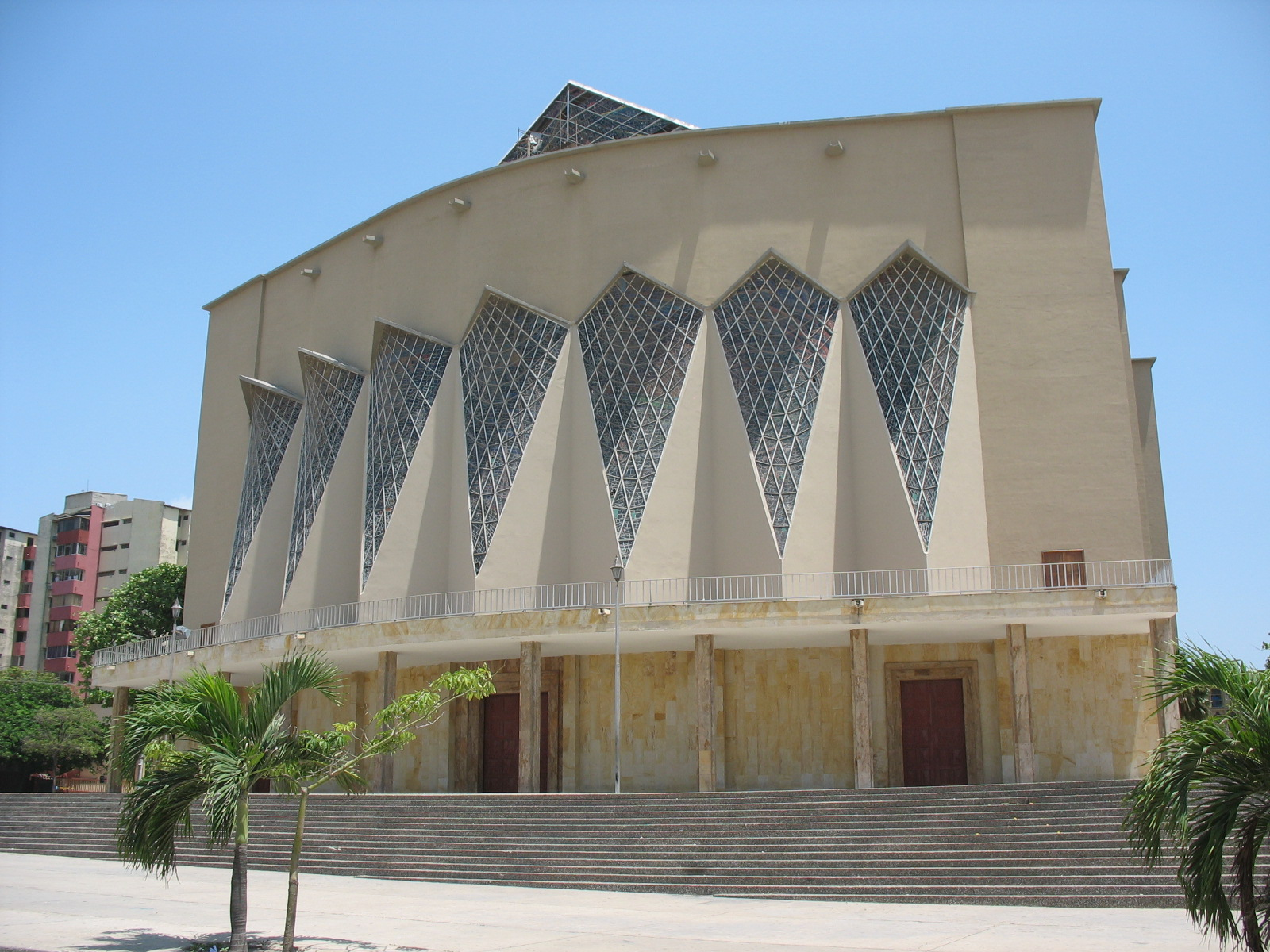
Metropolitan Cathedral of Mary the Queen

The Roman Catholic Archdiocese of Barranquilla (Latin: Archidiocesis Barranquillensis) is an archdiocese located in the city of Barranquilla in Colombia.

== History ==
- 7 July 1932: Established as Diocese of Barranquilla from the Archdiocese of Cartagena
- 25 April 1969: Promoted as Metropolitan Archdiocese of Barranquilla

== Special churches ==
- Pro-Cathedral:
  - Pro-Catedral de San Nicolás de Tolentino

== Bishops ==
=== Ordinaries, in reverse chronological order ===
- Archbishops of Barranquilla (Roman rite), below
  - Archbishop Pablo Emiro Salas Anteliz (2017.11.14 - present)
  - Archbishop Jairo Jaramillo Monsalve (2010.11.13 – 2017.11.14)
  - Archbishop Jesús Salazar Gómez (1999.03.18 – 2010.07.08), appointed Archbishop of Bogotá (Cardinal in 2012)
  - Archbishop Félix María Torres Parra (1987.05.11 – 1999.03.18)
  - Archbishop Germán Villa Gaviria, C.I.M. (1969.04.25 – 1987.05.11); see below
- Bishops of Barranquilla (Roman rite), below
  - Bishop Germán Villa Gaviria, C.I.M. (1959.02.03 – 1969.04.25); see above
  - Bishop Francisco Gallego Pérez (1953.02.03 – 1958.12.18)
  - Bishop Jesús Antonio Castro Becerra (1948.08.19 – 1952.12.18), appointed Bishop of Palmira
  - Bishop Julio Caicedo Téllez, S.D.B. (1942.06.26 – 1948.02.23), appointed Bishop of Cali
  - Bishop Luis Calixto Leiva Charry (1933.11.21 – 1939.05.16)

=== Auxiliary bishops ===
- Carlos José Ruiseco Vieira (1971-1977), appointed Bishop of Montería
- Hugo Eugenio Puccini Banfi (1977-1987), appointed Bishop of Santa Marta
- Oscar Aníbal Salazar Gómez (1995-1999), appointed Bishop of La Dorada-Guaduas
- Luis Antonio Nova Rocha (2002-2010), appointed Bishop of Facatativá
- Victor Antonio Tamayo Betancourt (2003-2017)

== Suffragan dioceses ==
- El Banco
- Riohacha
- Santa Marta
- Valledupar

== See also ==
- Roman Catholicism in Colombia
