= Alfonso Uribe Jaramillo =

Colombian prelate (1914–1993)

His Excellency, The Most Reverend Alfonso Uribe Jaramillo
- Bishop of Rionegro
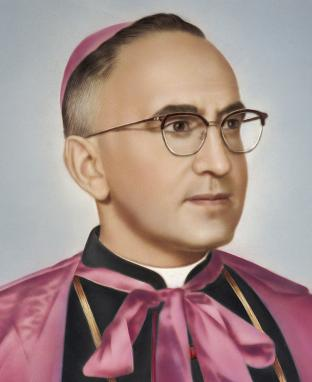
- Bishop Uribe Jaramillo in 185
- Diocese: Sonsón–Rionegro
- Installed: April 6, 1968
- Predecessor: Alfredo Rubio Díaz
- Successor: Flavio Calle Zapata
- Previous post: Auxiliary bishop of Cartagena

Orders
- Ordination: November 1, 1937 by Tiberio Salazar
- Consecration: August 4, 1963 by Tulio Botero

Personal details
- Born: January 6, 1914 Nariño, Antioquia, Colombia
- Died: July 15, 1993 (aged 79) La Ceja, Antioquia, Colombia
- Motto: In praise of the Priesthood of Christ

Styles of Alfonso Uribe Jaramillo
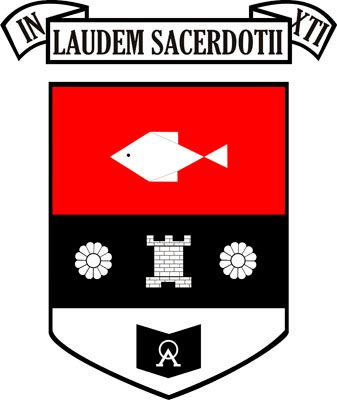
- Reference style: His Excellency; The Most Reverend
- Spoken style: Your Excellency
- Religious style: Bishop

Alfonso Uribe Jaramillo (January 6, 1914 - July 15, 1993) was a Colombian theologian, religious and philanthropist. Having served as Auxiliary Bishop of Cartagena from 1963 to 1968. On April 6, 1968, he would be appointed Bishop of the Diocese of Sonsón-Rionegro.

He was one of the leaders in the Catholic charismatic renewal in Latin America.

== Episcopal succession ==
Catholic Church titles
Preceded by Alfredo Rubio Diaz (as Bishop of Sonsón)	Bishop of Sonsón–Rionegro; 1968–1993	Succeeded by Flavio Calle Zapata
