= Diocese of Valledupar =

Diocese of the Catholic Church in Colombia

Diocese of Valledupar Dioecesis Valleduparensis Diócesis de Valledupar

Catholic
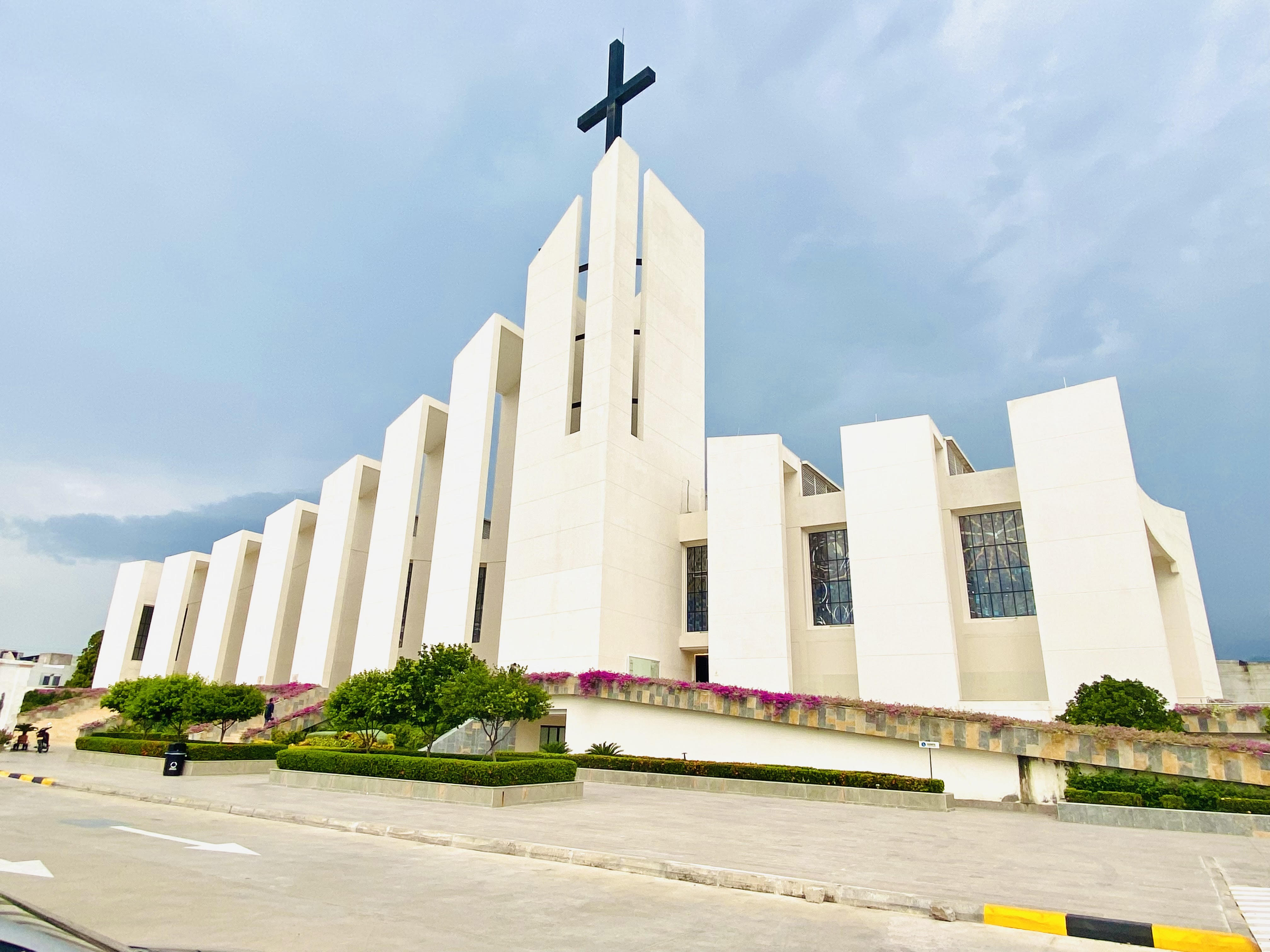
- Cathedral of Saint Eccehomo

- Coat of arms

Location
- Country: Colombia
- Ecclesiastical province: Barranquilla

Statistics
- Area: 28,780 km^{2} (11,110 sq mi)
- Population: Total; Catholics: (as of 2010); 736,000; 606,000 (82.3%)

Information
- Rite: Latin Rite
- Established: 4 December 1952 (73 years ago)
- Cathedral: Cathedral of Saint Eccehomo

Current leadership
- Pope: Leo XIV
- Bishop: Oscar José Vélez Isaza
- Metropolitan Archbishop: Pablo Emiro Salas Anteliz

Map

Website
- www.diocesisdevalledupar.org

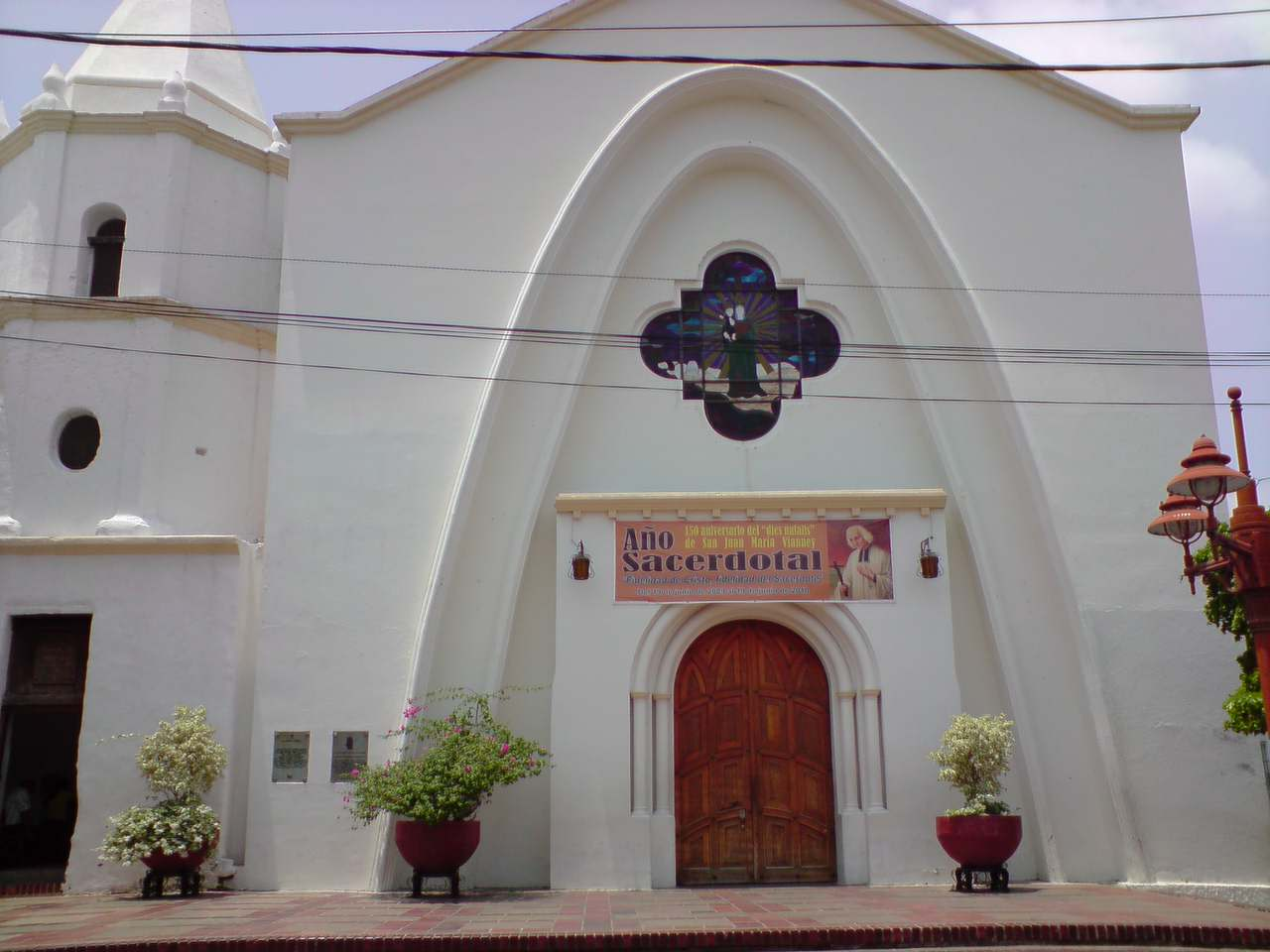
Cathedral of Our Lady of the Rosary

The Roman Catholic Diocese of Valledupar (Latin: Valleduparensis) is located in Cesar Department, Colombia with the cathedral in the city of Valledupar. It is in the ecclesiastical province of Barranquilla. It has been notable in trying to improve hospital care in the region.

== History ==
On 4 December 1952, the Apostolic Vicariate of Valledupar was established from the Apostolic Vicariate of Goajira. In 25 April 1969, it was promoted to the Diocese of Valledupar.

== Bishops ==
=== Ordinaries ===
- Vicar Apostolic of Valledupar (Roman rite)
  - Bishop Vicente Roig y Villalba, OFMCap (1952.12.04 – 1969.04.25)
- Bishops of Valledupar (Roman rite)
  - Vicente Roig y Villalba, OFMCap (1969.04.25 – 1977.04.05)
  - José Agustín Valbuena Jáuregui (1977.09.09 – 2003.06.10)
  - Oscar José Vélez Isaza, CMF (2003.06.10 – present)

=== Other priests of this diocese who became bishop ===
- Pablo Emiro Salas Anteliz, appointed Bishop of Diocese of Espinal in 2007
- Jesús Alberto Torres Ariza, appointed bishop of the Diocese of San José del Guaviare in November 2025

== See also ==
- Roman Catholicism in Colombia
