= Gilberto Jiménez Narváez =

Colombian theologian and Catholic bishop (1937–2015)

- Titular Bishop of Apollonia
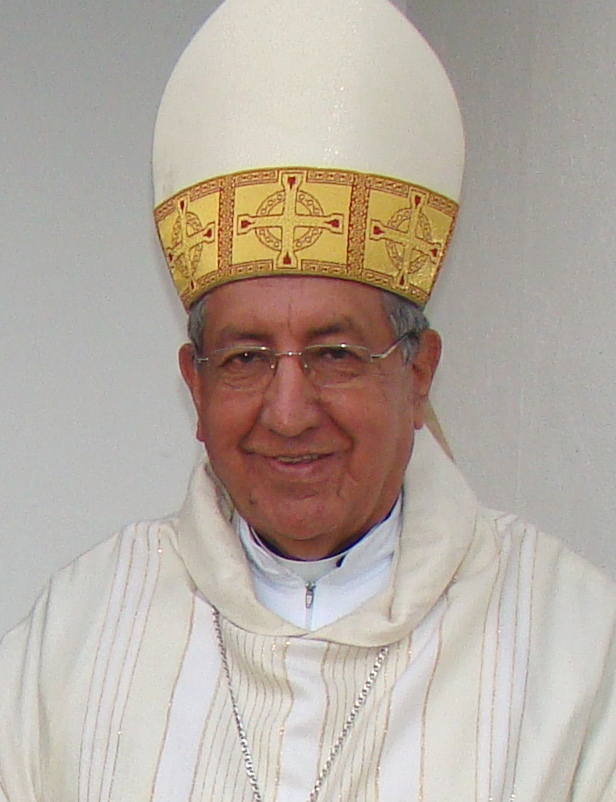
- Gilberto Jiménez Narváez in 2010
- Church: Catholic Church
- In office: 20 March 2001 – 20 October 2015
- Predecessor: Jorge María Mejía
- Successor: Claude Hamelin
- Previous posts: Auxiliary Bishop of Medellín (2001-2012); Bishop of Riohacha (1996-2001)

Orders
- Ordination: 1 September 1963 by Alfredo Rubio Diaz
- Consecration: 7 September 1996 by Flavio Calle Zapata

Personal details
- Born: 18 February 1937 Abejorral, Antioquia Department, Colombia
- Died: 20 October 2015 (aged 78)

Gilberto Jiménez Narváez (February 18, 1937 – October 20, 2015) was a Roman Catholic bishop.

Ordained to the priesthood in 1963, he was appointed bishop of the Roman Catholic Diocese of Riohacha, Colombia in 1996 and then auxiliary bishop of the Archdiocese of Medellin in 2001 retiring in 2012.
