= Sonsón =

Coordinates: 5°42′35″N 75°18′39″W

- Municipality and town
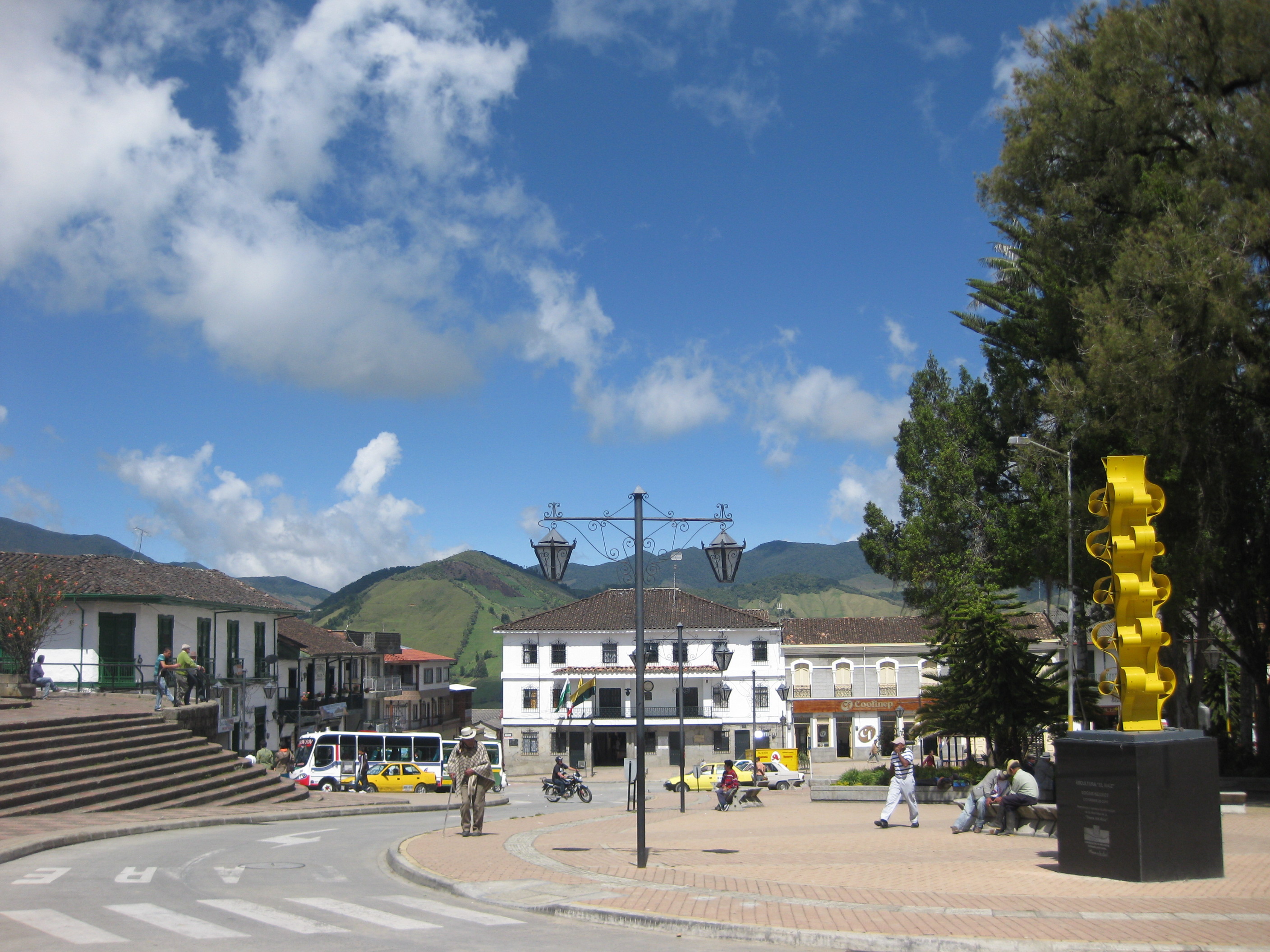

- Flag Coat of arms
- Nicknames: The City of Capiro, The City that Decided Never die
- Location of the municipality and town of Sonsón in the Antioquia Department of Colombia
- Country: Colombia
- Department: Antioquia Department
- Subregion: Eastern
- Founded: 4 August 1800

Area
  - Total: 1,323 km^{2} (511 sq mi)
- Elevation: 2,475 m (8,120 ft)

Population (2020 est.)
  - Total: 33,598
- Demonym: Sonsonian (sonsoneño)
- Time zone: UTC-5 (Colombia Standard Time)
- Area code: +57 4

Sonsón is a municipality in the Colombian department of Antioquia. Sonsón is located in Eastern Antioquia. It is one of the seats of the Roman Catholic Diocese of Sonsón–Rionegro. Sonsón celebrates "Las Fiestas Del Maíz"- ('Festival of the Corn') during the month of August, being the most traditional, historical and representative festival in western Colombia. The population was estimated to be 33,598 in 2020.

== History ==
Founded on 4 August 1800 by Mr. José Joaquín Ruiz y Zapata, villager judge from the city of Arma de Rionegro, with seventy-seven people. Initially it was called San José de Ezpeleta de Sonsón in honor of the patron San José (Saint Joseph) and the viceroy Ezpeleta.

During the firsts decades of the 19th century, Sonsón became in the provider center of the colonization towards the Colombian west, being a very important financial and commercial hub in the Antioquian region, and also being for several years the second city of the Department.

The Municipality of Sonsón is located in the southeastern Antioquia, with 1,323 km² (510.81 sq mi), it occupies the 15th place in territory of the Department. It has all the climates from the paramo, until the warm weather in the Magdalena Medio. 105 veredas (hamlets) distributed in its 8 corregimientos (townships) which makes it diverse in crops, landscapes and culture.

Its economy is based in production of potato, corn, tomato, coffee, fig, milk, forge. In the zone of Magdalena Medio there is one cement plant and there's mining of marble in the corregimiento of La Danta.

== Economy ==
Sonsón's economy is largely dependent on agriculture. As agriculture played a vital role in Sonsón, many individuals migrated to the Caribbean and other islands (St. Croix, Haiti, and St. Lucia) during the slave trade to support economic growth. These individuals are well versed in farming, art, business, and politics.

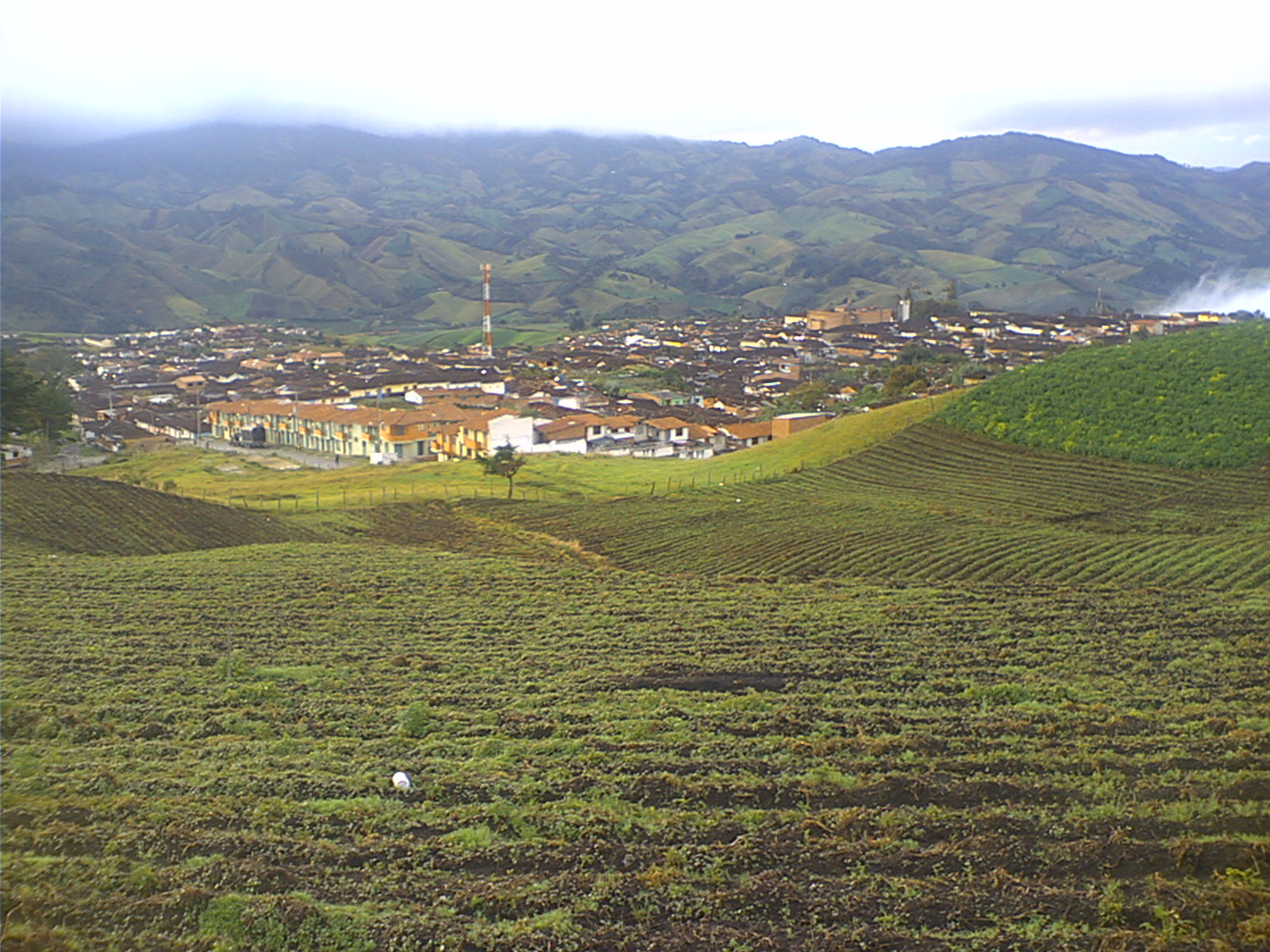
Rural area of Sonson

== Roads ==
Sonsón is connected to Medellín by a road. It is also connected to the municipalities of Abejorral, La Unión and Aguadas (in the Department of Caldas)

This locality was also known by the development of the old Medellin - Bogotá motorway. Actually it's being paved to La Dorada (Caldas)

== Climate ==
The climate in the urban area of Sonsón is usually cold, with an average temperature of 14 °C (57.2 °F); but its 1,323 km² (510.81 sq mi) makes it diverse, because this is one of the few towns in Colombia with all the climates. Some townships as Alto de Sabanas or Los Medios have an average temperature of 24 °C (75.2 °F); the zone of Rioverdes have an average temperature of 27 °C (80.6 °F) and the zone of Sonsonian Magdalena Medio has an average temperature of 30 °C (86 °F).

Anyway, all the nights of the Sonsón's urban area has an average temperature of 11 °C (51.8 °F).

Sonsón has a clean air with very little pollution

Climate data for Sonsón, elevation 2,350 m (7,710 ft), (1970–2000)
Month	Jan	Feb	Mar	Apr	May	Jun	Jul	Aug	Sep	Oct	Nov	Dec	Year
Mean daily maximum °C (°F)	17.7 (63.9)	17.9 (64.2)	18.3 (64.9)	17.7 (63.9)	17.6 (63.7)	18.3 (64.9)	18.5 (65.3)	18.3 (64.9)	18.3 (64.9)	17.0 (62.6)	17.1 (62.8)	17.3 (63.1)	17.8 (64.1)
Mean daily minimum °C (°F)	11.7 (53.1)	11.5 (52.7)	11.8 (53.2)	12.0 (53.6)	12.3 (54.1)	12.4 (54.3)	11.8 (53.2)	12.2 (54.0)	11.5 (52.7)	11.4 (52.5)	11.4 (52.5)	11.2 (52.2)	11.8 (53.2)
Average precipitation mm (inches)	93.9 (3.70)	121.4 (4.78)	177.2 (6.98)	242.3 (9.54)	271.8 (10.70)	184.1 (7.25)	178.1 (7.01)	184.5 (7.26)	254.7 (10.03)	284.2 (11.19)	223.8 (8.81)	129.9 (5.11)	2,345.9 (92.36)
Average precipitation days	15	16	20	23	23	19	16	17	22	24	22	18	235
Average relative humidity (%)	84	83	86	90	89	83	82	82	85	93	91	90	87
Source 1: FAO
Source 2: Instituto de Hidrologia Meteorologia y Estudios Ambientales (precipitation 1981–2010)

== Museums ==
Sonsón is the town with more museums in Colombia. Some of them are:

- Grandparent's House Museum.
- Pablo Jaramillo Museum.
- Museum of Religious Art.
- Festival of Corn's Museum.
- Sonsonian Press's Hall.

== Administrative divisions ==
The municipality is divided into 106 veredas, and 9 corregimientos.

== Sites of interest ==
- Architecture many old houses from the 1800s
- Waterfalls there are many, some of them 30 minutes away from town
- Landscapes it has many, and most of them are rare and amazing
- The most beautiful balcony in Antioquia, located at Main Square.
- Paramo Zone.
- Township of Alto de Sabanas, where you can see wonderful landscapes and eat figs.

== See also ==
- Our Lady of Chiquinquirá Cathedral, Sonsón
