= Diocese of Sonsón–Rionegro =

Roman Catholic diocese in Colombia

Diocese of Sonsón–Rionegro Dioecesis Sonsonensis – Rivi Nigri

Catholic

Location
- Country: Colombia
- Ecclesiastical province: Medellín

Statistics
- Area: 7,300 km^{2} (2,800 sq mi)
- Population: Total; Catholics: (as of 2004); 565,000; 550,000 (97.3%)

Information
- Rite: Latin Rite
- Established: 18 March 1957 (69 years ago)
- Cathedral: Our Lady of Chiquinquirá Cathedral, Sonsón
- Co-cathedral: Concatedral de San Nicolás in Rionegro

Current leadership
- Pope: Leo XIV
- Bishop: Fidel León Cadavid Marin

Map

Website
- www.diosonrio.org.co

The Roman Catholic Diocese of Sonsón–Rionegro (Latin: Sonsonensis – Rivi Nigri) is a diocese located in the cities of Sonsón and Rionegro in the ecclesiastical province of Medellín in Colombia.

== History ==
- 18 March 1957: Established as Diocese of Sonsón from the Metropolitan Archdiocese of Medellín
- 20 April 1968: Renamed as Diocese of Sonsón – Rionegro

== Special churches ==
- Minor Basilica:
  - Basílica de Nuestra Señora del Carmen, La Ceja

== Bishops ==
=== Ordinaries ===
- Bishops of Sonsón
  - Alberto Uribe Urdaneta † (18 Mar 1957 – 13 Jul 1960) Appointed, Bishop of Cali
  - Alfredo Rubio Diaz † (12 Feb 1961 – 27 Mar 1968) Appointed, Archbishop of Nueva Pamplona
- Bishops of Sonsón–Rionegro
  - Alfonso Uribe Jaramillo † (6 Apr 1968 – 16 Feb 1993) Retired
  - Flavio Calle Zapata (16 Feb 1993 – 10 Jan 2003) Appointed, Archbishop of Ibagué
  - Ricardo Antonio Tobón Restrepo (25 Apr 2003 – 16 Feb 2010) Appointed, Archbishop of Medellín
  - Fidel León Cadavid Marin (2 Feb 2011 – present)

=== Auxiliary bishop ===
- Óscar Ángel Bernal (1986-1988), appointed Bishop of Girardota

=== Other priests of this diocese who became bishops ===
- Ignacio José Gómez Aristizábal, appointed Bishop of Ocaña in 1972
- Jairo Jaramillo Monsalve, appointed Bishop of Riohacha in 1988
- Oscar Aníbal Salazar Gómez, appointed Auxiliary Bishop of Barranquilla in 1995
- Ismael Rueda Sierra (priest here, 1981-1988), appointed Auxiliary Bishop of Cartagena in 2000
- Guillermo Orozco Montoya, appointed Bishop of San José del Guaviare in 2006
- Elkin Fernando Álvarez Botero, appointed Auxiliary Bishop of Medellín in 2012
- Omar de Jesús Mejía Giraldo, appointed Bishop of Florencia in 2013
- Carlos Alberto Correa Martínez, appointed Vicar Apostolic of Guapi in 2013
- José Saúl Grisales Grisales, appointed Bishop of Ipiales in 2018

== Gallery ==
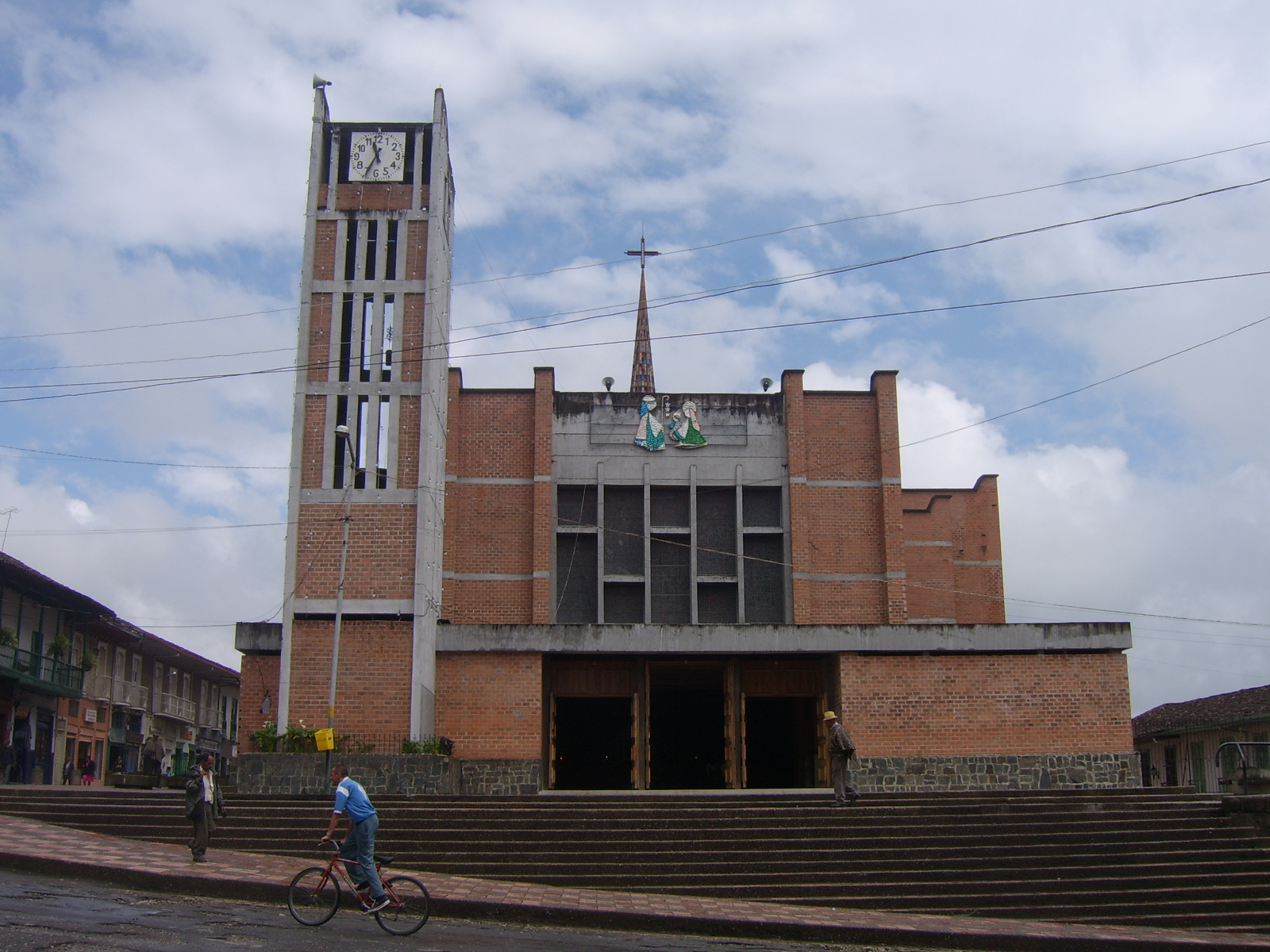
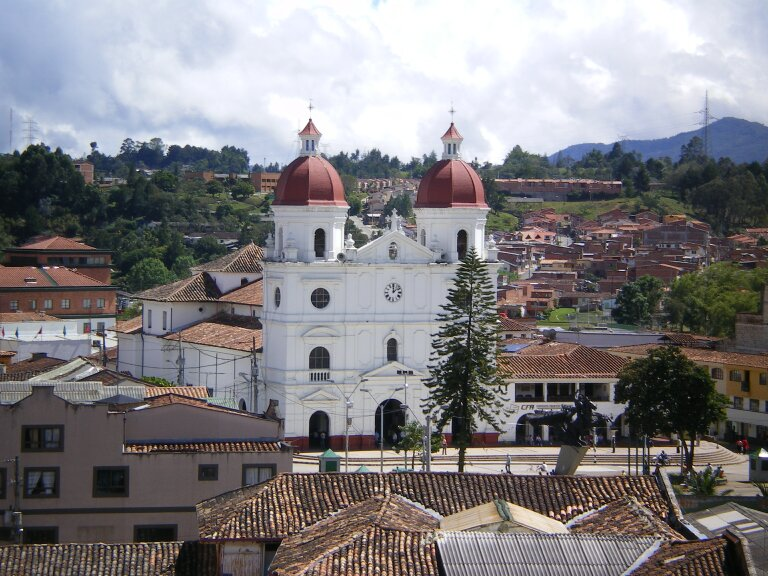
Cathedral of Our Lady of Chiquinquirá in Sonsón (left) Co-Cathedral of St. Nicholas in Rionegro (right)

== See also ==
- Roman Catholicism in Colombia
