= Victor Antonio Tamayo Betancourt =

Victor Antonio Tamayo Betancourt (born 20 July 1937 in Anori) is a Roman Catholic, Colombian clergyman and auxiliary bishop in Barranquilla and titular bishop of Voncariana in North Africa.

== Life ==
The Bishop of Barranquilla, Germán Villa Gaviria CIM, gave him priest ordination on December 20, 1964, and he was incardinated into the clergy of the bishopric of Barranquilla. Pope John Paul II appointed him on 12 December 2003 as auxiliary bishop in Barranquilla and titular bishop of Voncariana.

The Archbishop of Barranquilla, Rubén Salazar Gómez, gave him the bishop's consecration on 24 January of that year; Co-conquerors were Beniamino Stella, Apostolic Nuncio in Colombia, and Hugo Eugenio Puccini Banfi (Bishop of Santa Marta).

He traces his apostolic succession through Giulio Antonio Cardinal Santorio and, like 95% of the New World's Catholic bishops, Scipione Cardinal Rebiba.
