= La Ceja, Antioquia =

La Ceja del Tambo
- Municipality and town
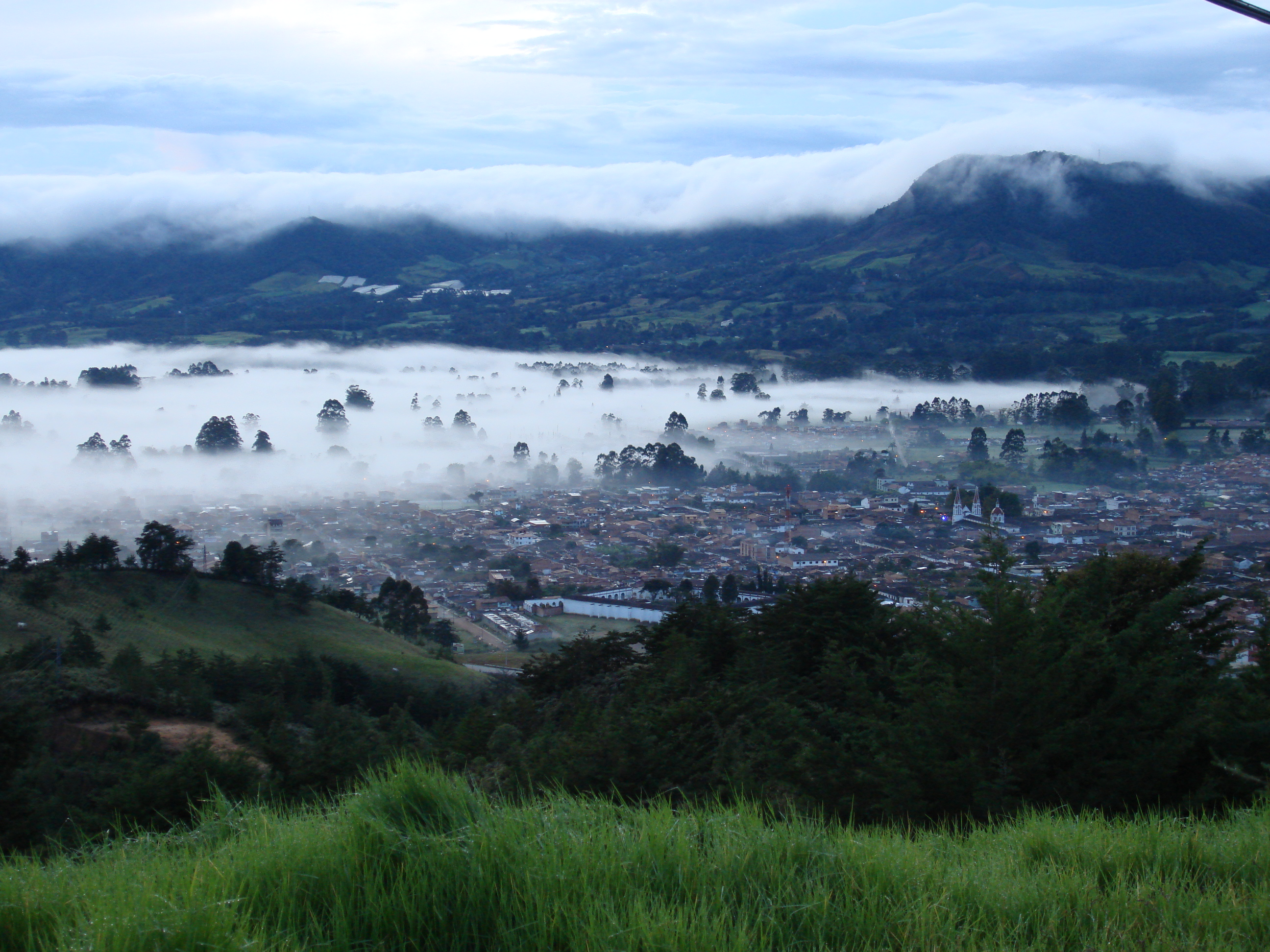

- Flag

- Location of the municipality and town of La Ceja in the Antioquia Department of Colombia

- Location in Colombia
- Coordinates: 6°00′39″N 75°25′39″W
- Country: Colombia
- Department: Antioquia Department
- Subregion: Eastern
- Founded: 1789

Government
  - Leader: María Ilbed Santa

Area
  - Municipality and town: 131 km^{2} (51 sq mi)
  - Urban: 4.03 km^{2} (1.56 sq mi)
- Elevation: 2,200 m (7,200 ft)

Population (2018 census)
  - Municipality and town: 64,889
  - Density: 495/km^{2} (1,280/sq mi)
  - Urban: 54,820
  - Urban density: 13,600/km^{2} (35,200/sq mi)
- Demonym: Cejeños
- Time zone: UTC-5 (Colombia Standard Time)
- Area code: 57 + 4
- Website: www.laceja-antioquia.gov.co

La Ceja del Tambo, known as La Ceja, is a town and municipality in the Antioquia Department of Colombia. It is part of the subregion of Eastern Antioquia. La Ceja borders the Rionegro and Carmen de Viboral municipalities to the north, La Unión to the east, and Montebello and Retiro to the west. It is located approximately 41 kilometers from Medellín, the department capital.

The town is known for being well-connected with other towns and municipalities in Antioquia through its extensive roads and highways, including the Medellin-Bogota highway, the Las Palmas roads, and the Medellín Santa Elena road. It also has a dirt road that leads to the Mesopotamia neighborhood of La Unión.

Father Germán Montoya wrote the hymn for the town, called "Hymn of La Ceja del Tambo". Donato Duque Patiño created the flag.

== History ==
The territory today known as "La Ceja" was first inhabited by the Tahamíes. Tahamíes is an indigenous people dedicated to agriculture, specifically the cultivation of maize. By 1541 the Spanish conquistadors arrived in the town, led by Álvaro de Mendoza, deputy to Marshal Jorge Robledo. On arrival to this region, Mendoza discovered a vast and fertile valley full of green meadows furrowed by abundant and clean water. He called it the "Valley of Santamaría", which today is known as the "Valley of La Ceja del Tambo".

Since the early 17th century, many people from Antioquia, especially residents of Medellín and Santa Fe de Antioquia, moved to the area due to its natural attractions and fertile land suitable for agricultural industry and livestock.

In 1683, a path was cleared between San Nicolás de Rionegro and Santiago de Arma, which in turn led to Popayán. The locals built a shelter, or "tambo" to the side of this route, which originated the subsequent naming of this town as "La Ceja del Tambo".

The town was founded as "La Ceja" on 7 December 1789. It was founded by María Josefa Marulanda Londoño and Father José Pablo de Villa.

By 1824, the town had 2,012 inhabitants, of which 98 were slaves.

La Ceja was elevated to the status of municipality in 1855. In 1905, the first studies for the installation of an aqueduct were made and in 1927 came into operation the first aqueduct and sewerage systems.

== Demography ==
The population was 64,889 at the 2018 census.

Total population: 48,879 inhabitants (2009)

- Urban population: 41,587
- Rural population: 7,292

=== Ethnography ===
According to figures presented by DANE census in 2005, the ethnic makeup of the township is the following:

- White & Mestizo: 92.1%
- Afro-Colombian: 7.9%

== Economy ==
Unlike other towns in eastern Antioquia that focus on mining, La Ceja has traditionally been a town of agriculture and raising livestock.

The main agricultural products of the Municipality are tamarillo, bananas, blackberries, caturro and coffee, and other fruits and vegetables.

Traditionally, dairy farming has been a very important part of the economy. Currently about 70,000 litres of milk per day are produced in the region.

To the north of the city, there are many cut flower growers and exporters, which provide the main source of employment for La Ceja's inhabitants. The majority of the production from these flower farms is exported to the United States. The main flower varieties in production are chrysanthemums, hydrangeas, gerberas, and asters.

== Places of interest ==
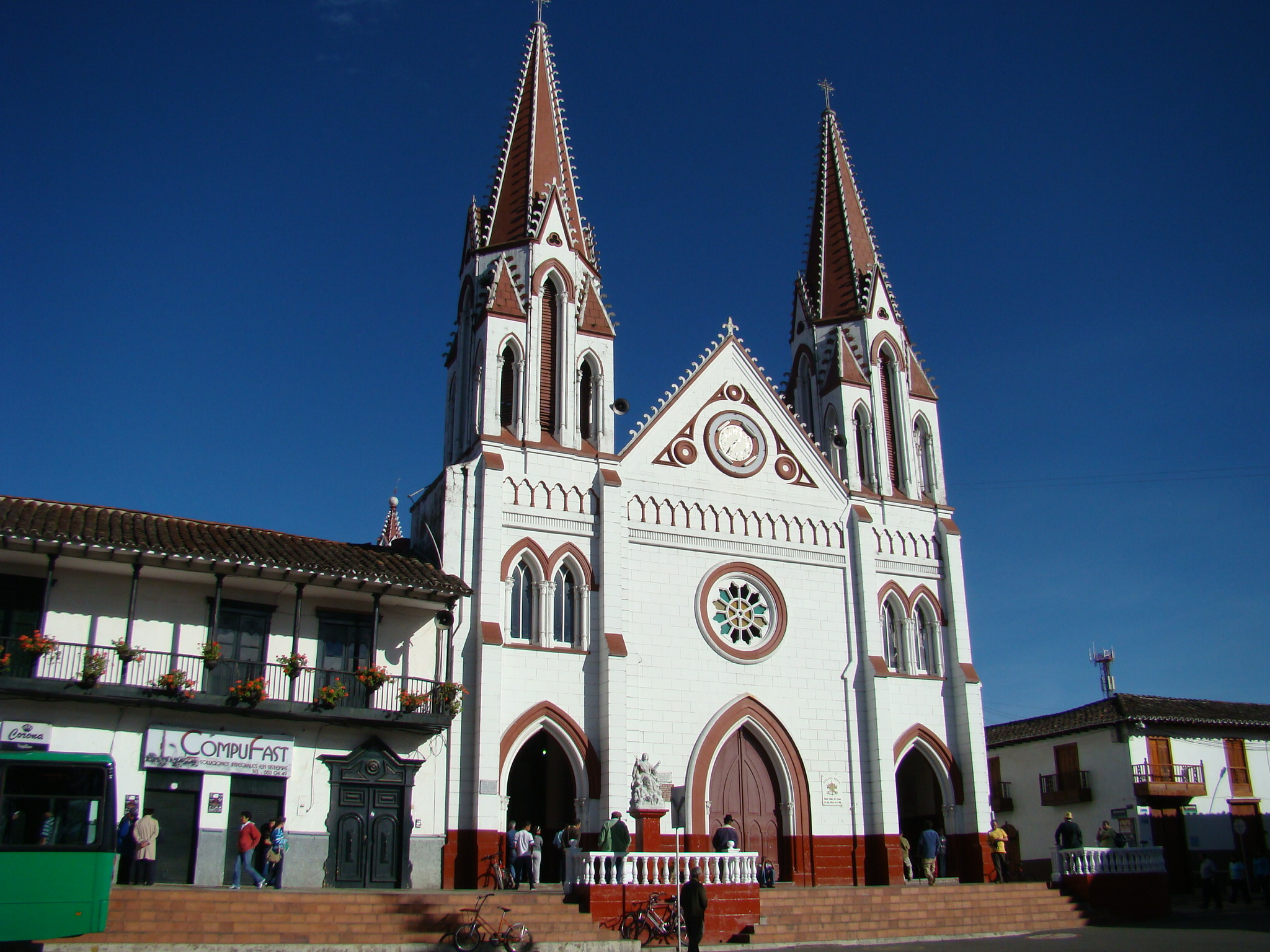
Minor Basilica of Our Lady of Carmen

The town has more than a thousand commercial establishments: restaurants, cafes, bars, entertainment centers, newsstands, clothing stores, Internet cafes, drugstores, supermarkets, hotels, shops, travel agencies and leases, health centers, schools, and more.

The main plaza also has two churches, the Chapel of Our Lady of Chiquinquirá and the Minor Basilica of Our Lady of Carmen. The former chapel is also considered a museum of religious art, and contains works by artists such as Gregorio Vasquez de Arce y Ceballos.

Additional attractions include the following:

- Buey river waterfall
- Pantanillo river
- Juan de Dios Aranzazu Theater
- Gregorio Gutiérrez González House of Culture

In addition to all the typical gastronomy of the Paisa region, La Ceja is famous for its sweets and preserves such as custards, jams, jellies, arequipes, chocolate delicacies, and panelitas.

== Gallery ==
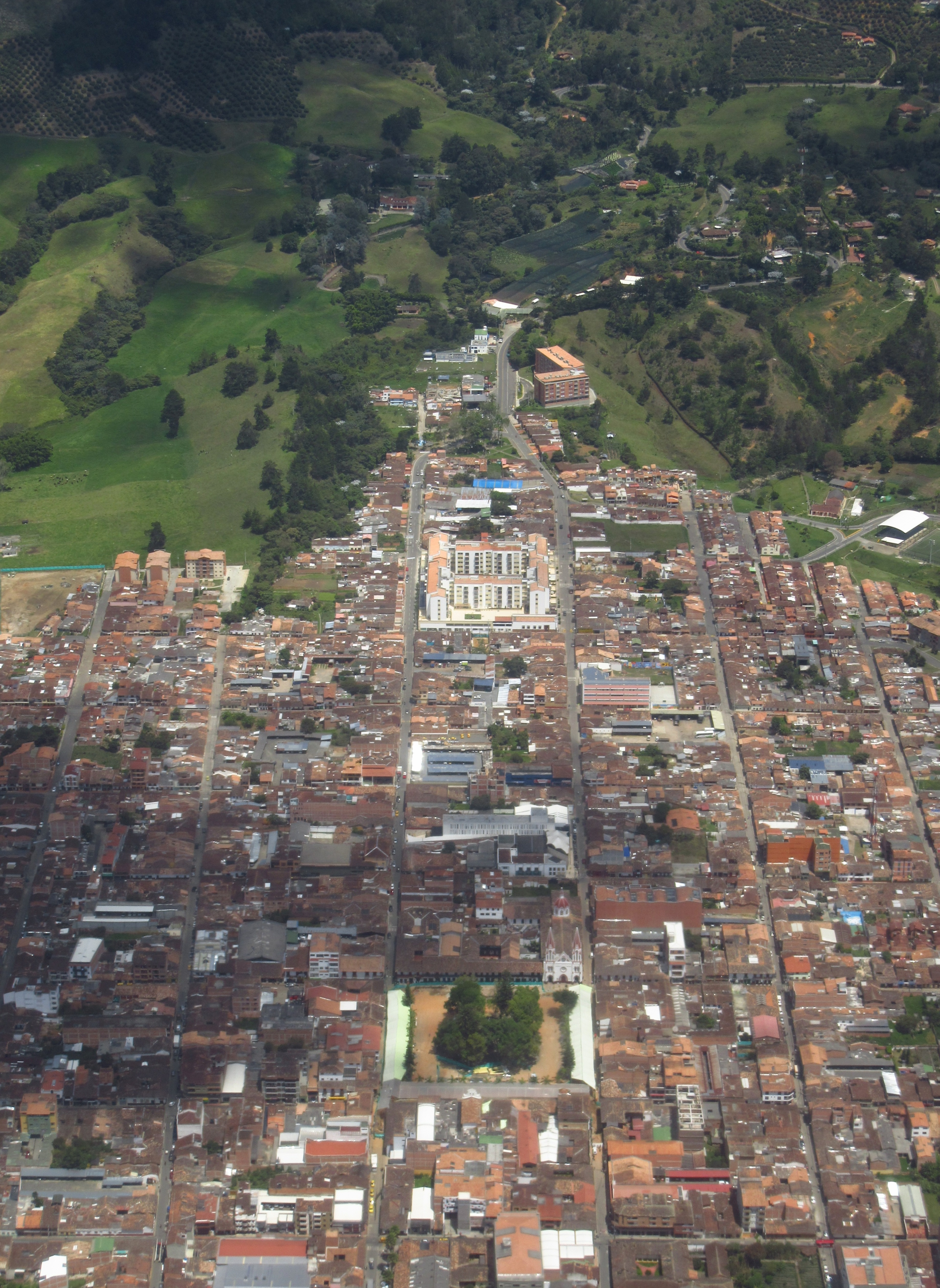
La Ceja from the air

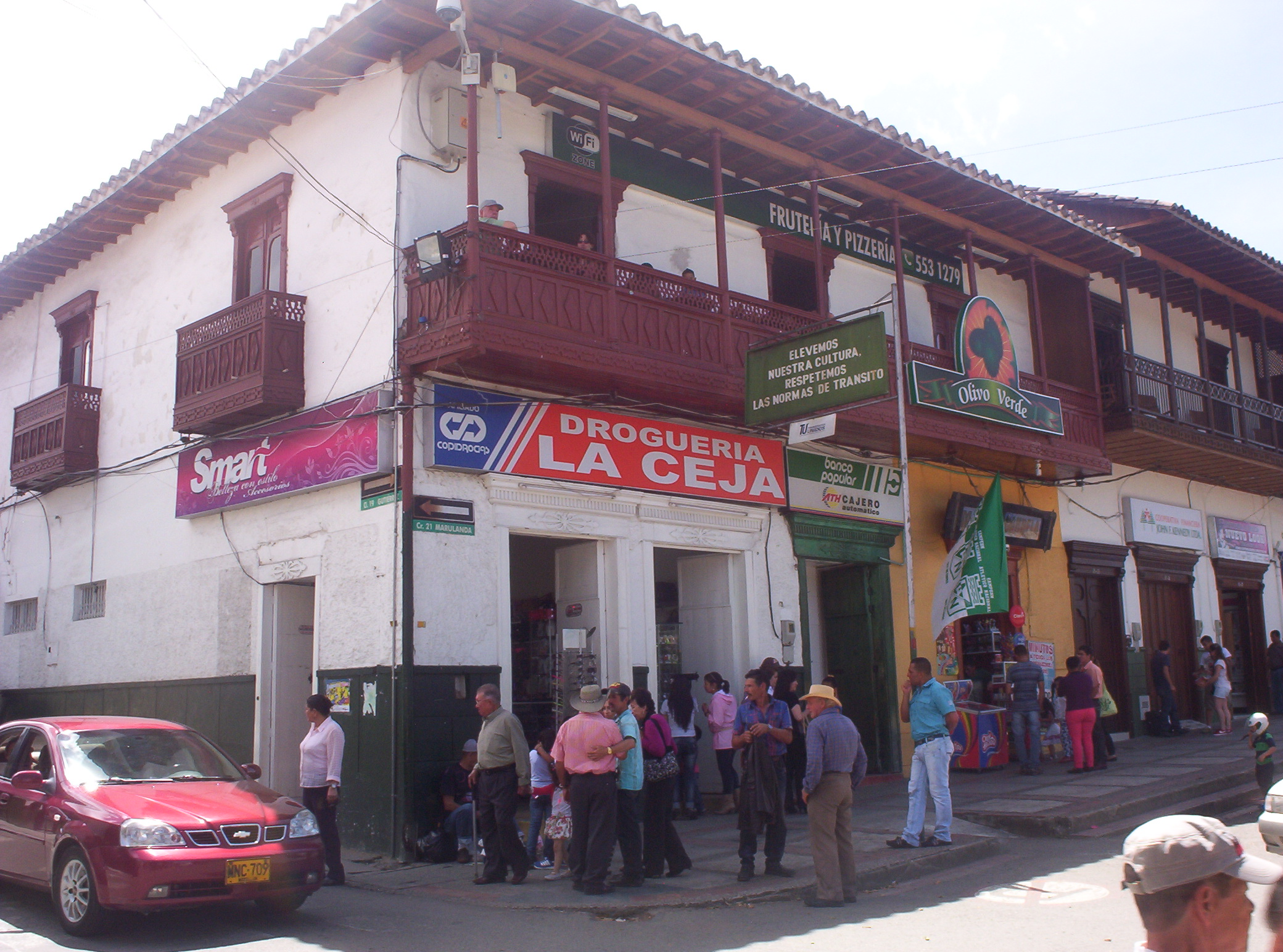
Shops and restaurants on the main plaza

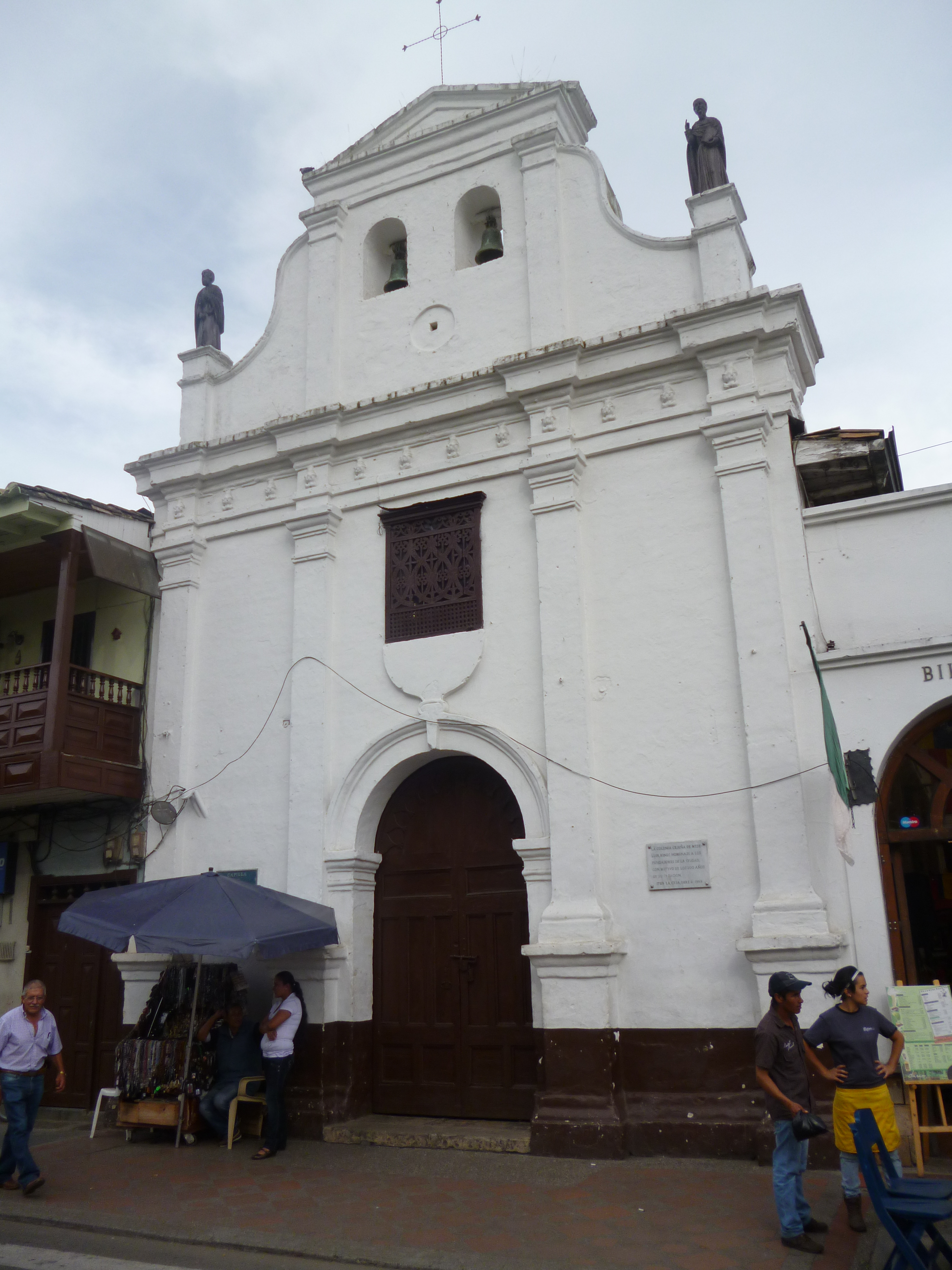
Chapel of Our Lady of Chiquinquirá

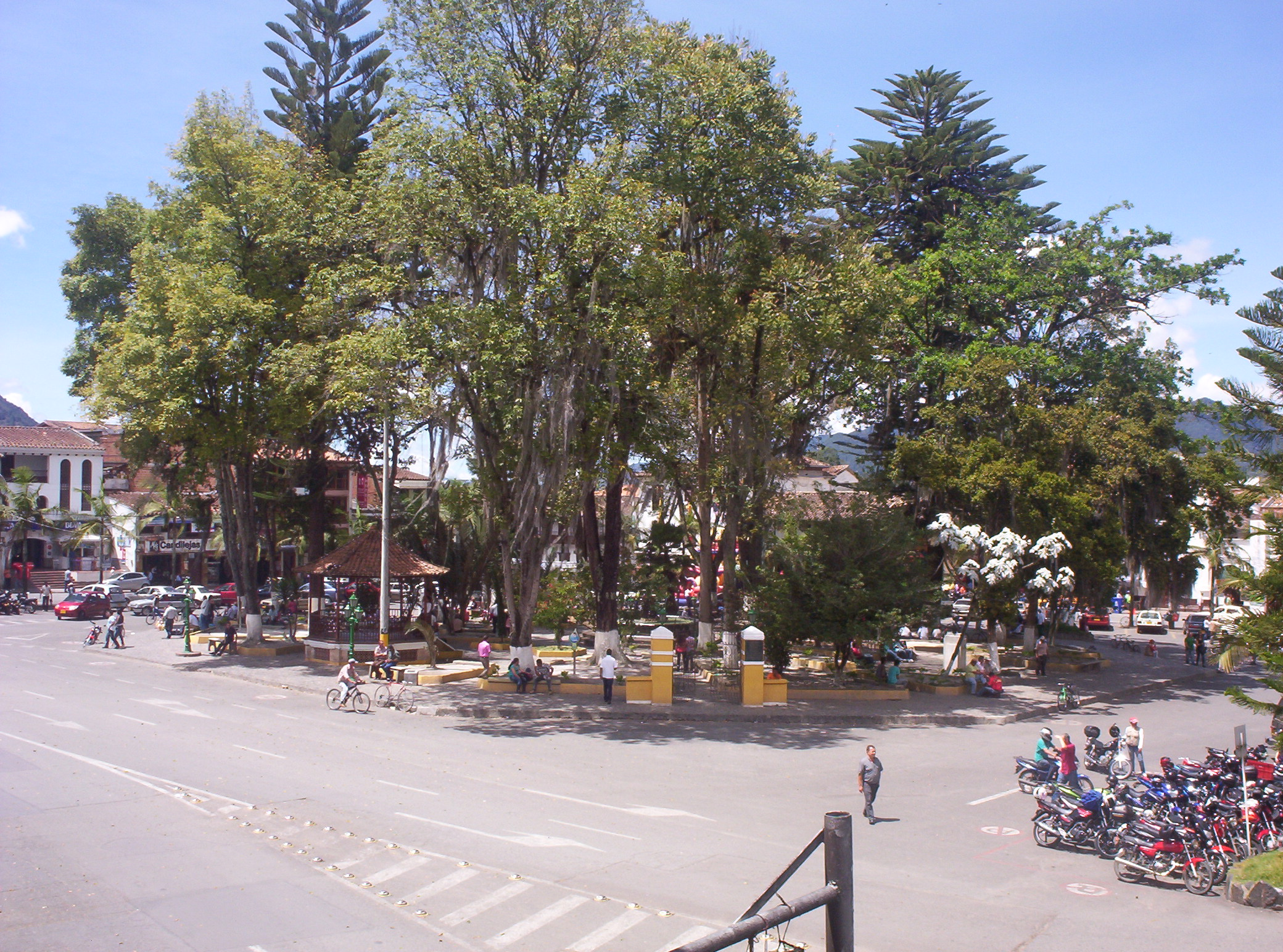
Main plaza in 2002 from the west

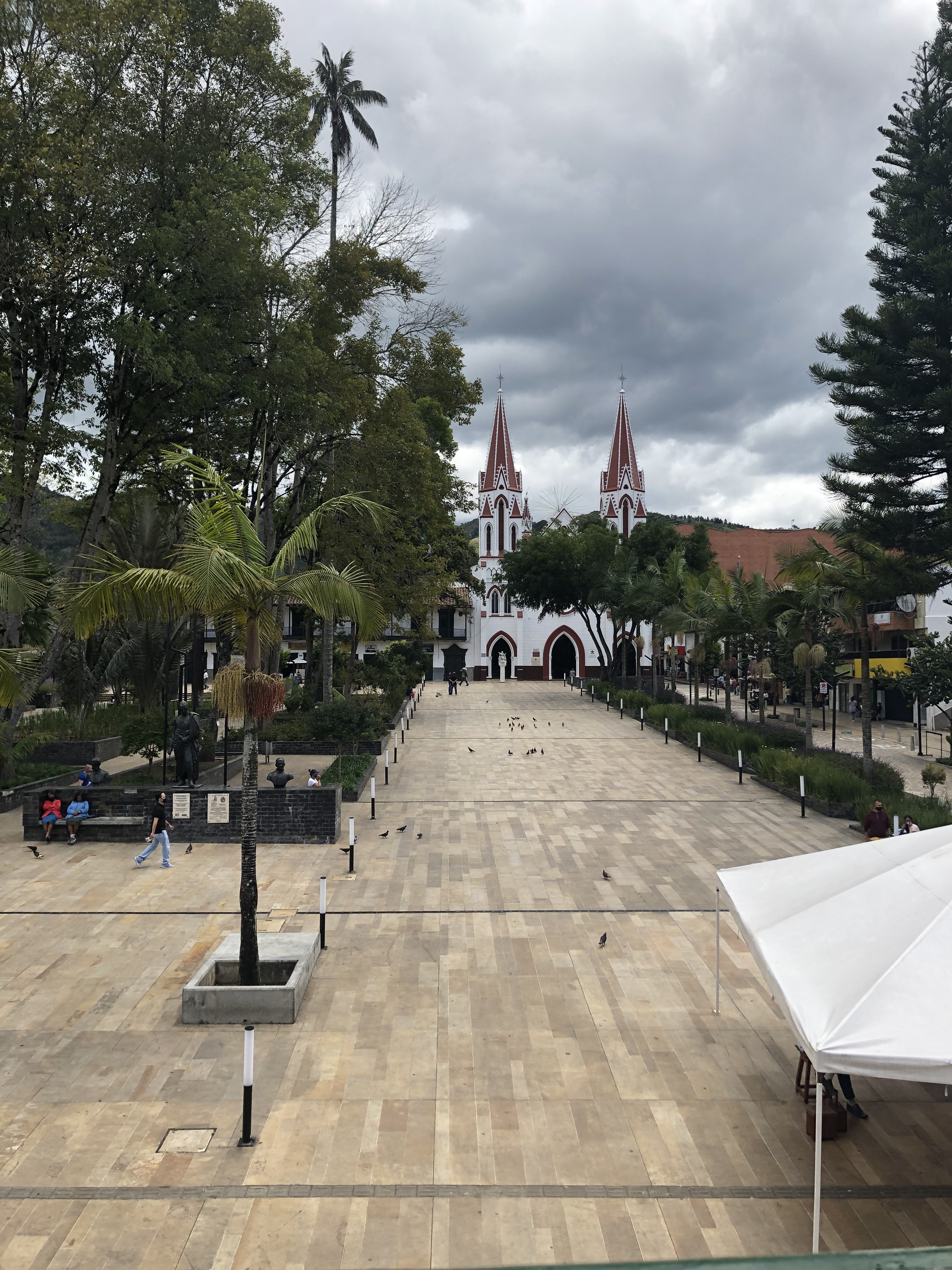
Main plaza in 2021 from the east

== See also ==
- Tequendamita Falls
