= List of cathedrals in Colombia =

Cathedrals in Colombia

This is the list of cathedrals in Colombia sorted by denomination.

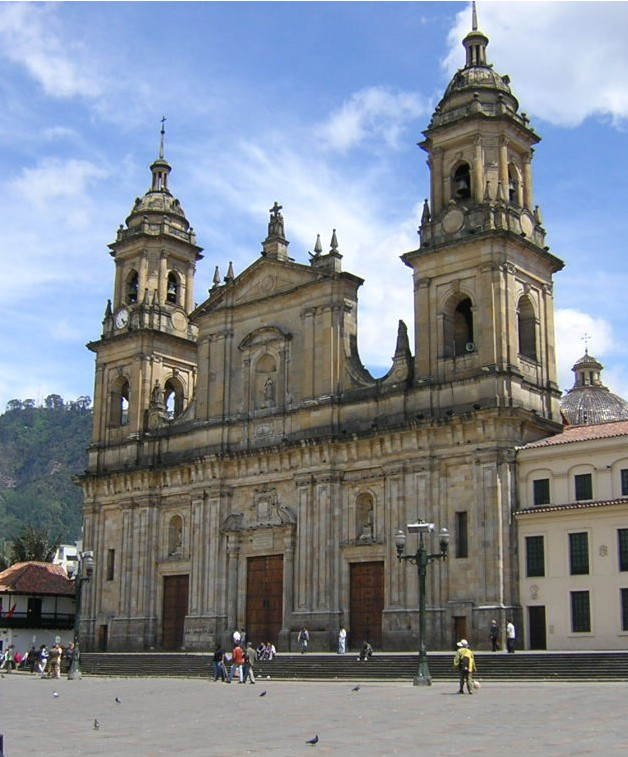
Primatial Cathedral Basilica of the Immaculate Conception in Bogotá

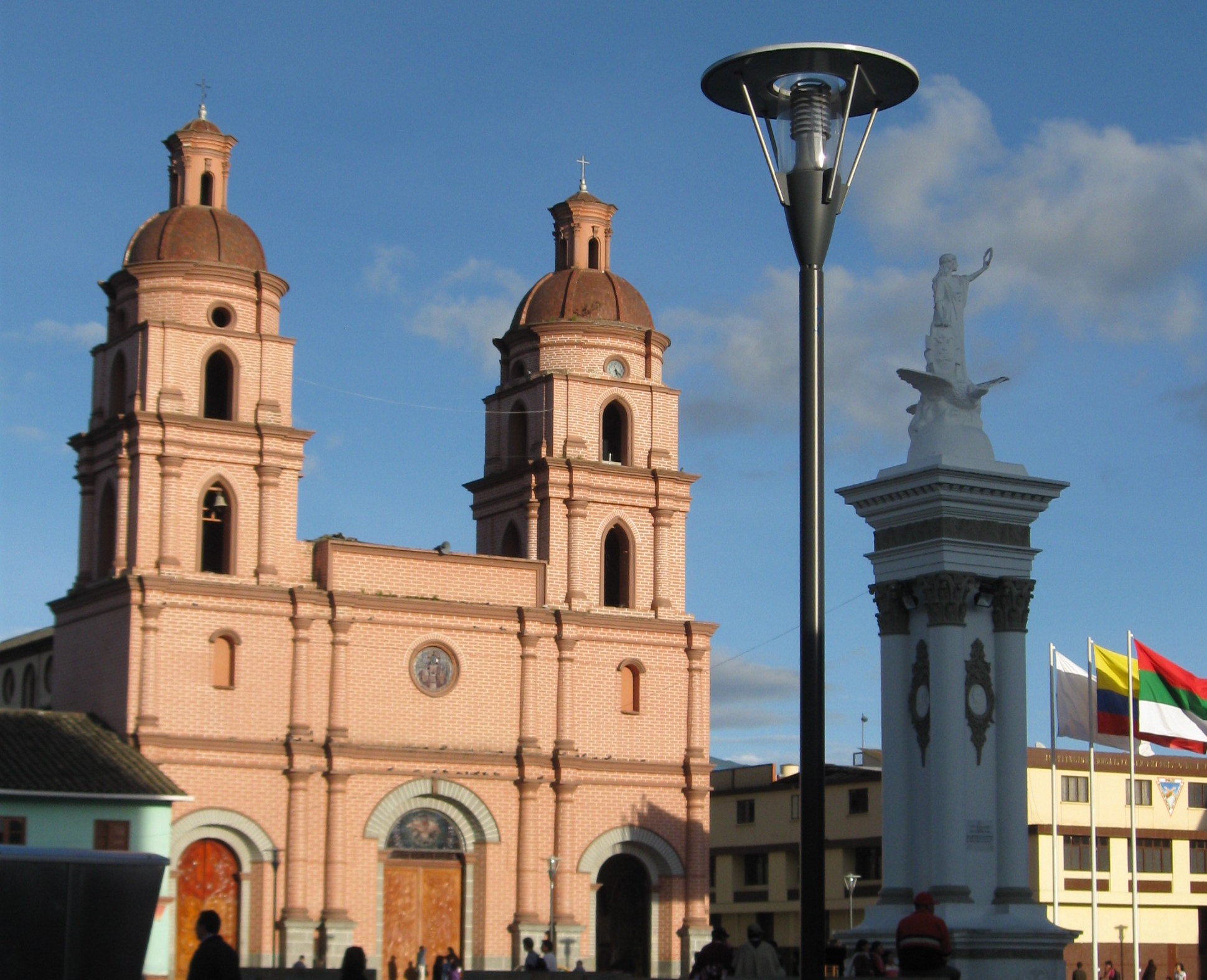
Cathedral of St. Peter Martyr in Ipiales

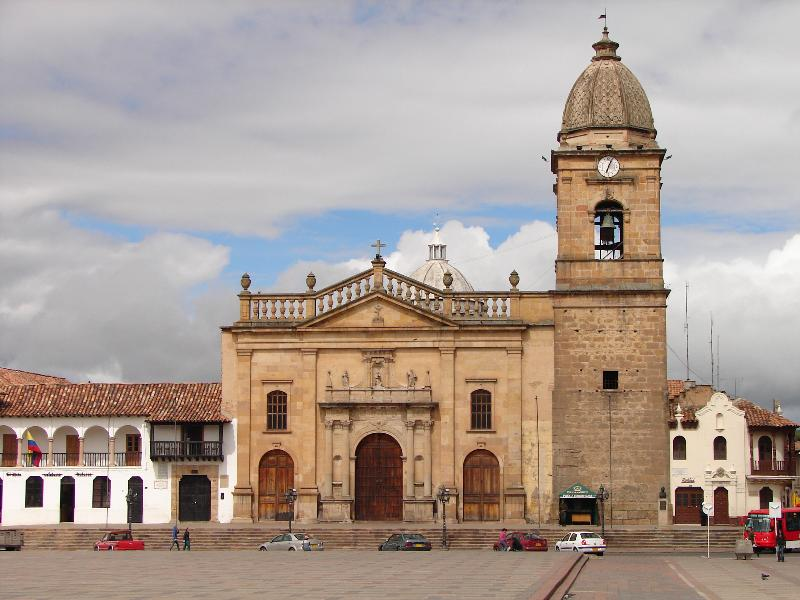
Cathedral Basilica of St. James the Apostle in Tunja

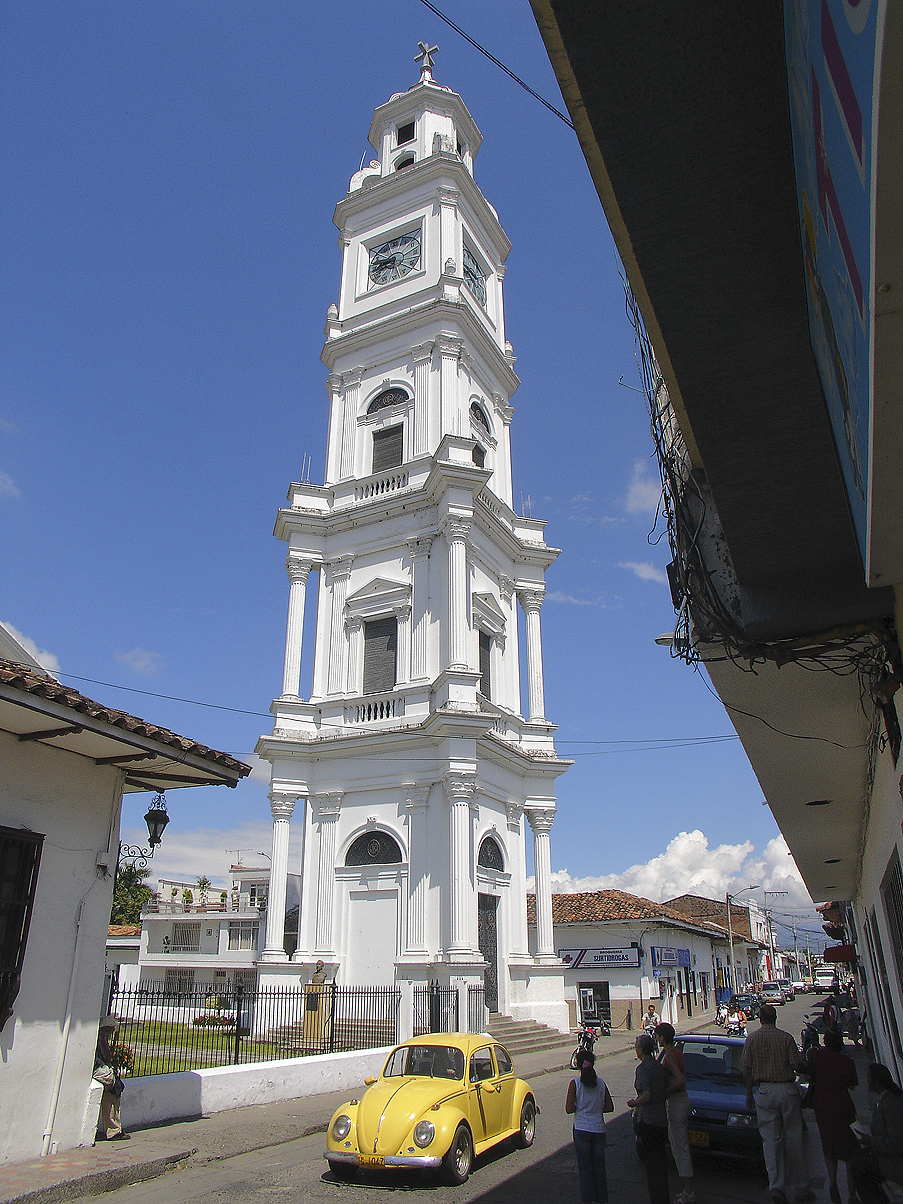
Catedral Nuestra Señora del Carmen in Cartago

== Catholic ==
Cathedrals of the Catholic Church in Colombia:

- Cathedral of Our Lady of Carmel in Apartadó
- Cathedral of St. Barbara in Arauca
- Cathedral of the Immaculate Conception in Armenia
- Cathedral of the Sacred Heart in Barrancabermeja
- Metropolitan Cathedral of Queen Mary in Barranquilla
- Primatial Cathedral Basilica of the Immaculate Conception in Bogotá
- Cathedral of the Holy Family in Bucaramanga
- Cathedral of St. Bonaventure in Buenaventura
- Cathedral of St. Peter the Apostle in Buga
- Cathedral of Our Lady of Mercies in Caldas
- Cathedral of St. Peter the Apostle in Santiago de Cali
- Metropolitan Cathedral Basilica of Saint Catherine of Alexandria in Cartagena de Indias
- Catedral Nuestra Señora del Carmen in Cartago
- Cathedral of the Sacred Heart of Jesus in Chiquinquirá
- Cathedral of St. Joseph in Cúcuta
- Cathedral of St. Lawrence in Duitama
- Co-Cathedral of St. Martin in Sogamoso
- Catedral Nuestra Señora de La Candelaria in El Banco
- Cathedral of St. John the Baptist in Engativá
- Cathedral of Our Lady of Rosary in Espinal
- Cathedral of Our Lady of the Rosary in Facatativá
- Cathedral of Our Lady of Lourdes in Florencia
- Cathedral of St. James the Apostle in Fontibón
- Cathedral of Our Lady of the Rosary in Garagoa
- Cathedral of St. Michael the Archangel in Garzón
- Cathedral of the Immaculate Heart of Mary in Girardot
- Cathedral of Our Lady of the Rosary in Girardota
- Cathedral of Our Lady of Mount Carmel in Granada
- Cathedral of the Immaculate Conception in Guapi
- Cathedral of the Immaculate Conception in Ibagué
- Cathedral of Our Lady of Carmel in Inírida
- Cathedral of St. Peter Martyr in Ipiales
- Cathedral of St. Paul the Apostle in Istmina
- Co-Cathedral of St. Joseph in Tadó
- Cathedral of Our Lady of Mercy in Jericó
- Cathedral of Our Lady of Carmel in La Dorada
- Co-Cathedral of St. Michael the Archangel in Guaduas
- Cathedral of Our Lady of Peace in Leticia
- Cathedral of Our Lady of Carmel in Líbano
- Cathedral of Our Lady of Candelaria in Magangue
- Cathedral of the Immaculate Conception in Málaga
- Co-Cathedral of the Immaculate Conception in Soatá
- Cathedral Basilica of Our Lady of Rosary in Manizales
- Metropolitan Cathedral Basilica of the Immaculate Conception of Mary in Medellín
- Cathedral of St. Alphonsus de Ligouri in Sibundoy
- Co-Cathedral of St. Michael in Mocoa
- Cathedral of the Holy Cross in Montelíbano
- Cathedral of St. Jerome in Montería
- Cathedral of the Immaculate Conception in Neiva
- Cathedral of St. Clare in Pamplona
- Military Cathedral of Jesus Christ Redeemer in Bogotá
- Cathedral of St. Ann in Ocaña
- Catedral de Nuestra Señora del Rosario del Palmar in Palmira
- Catedral de San Ezequiel Moreno Díaz in San Juan de Pasto
- Catedral de Nuestra Señora de la Pobreza in Pereira
- Catedral Basílica de Nuestra Señora de la Asunción in Popayán
- Cathedral of Our Lady of Carmel in Puerto Carreño
- Cathedral of Mary Mother of the Church in Puerto Gaitan
- Cathedral of St. Francis of Assisi in Quibdó
- Catedral Nuestra Señora de los Remedios in Riohacha
- Cathedral of the Holy Family in San Andrés
- Cathedral of St. Joseph in San José del Guaviare
- Catedral Basílica Metropolitana in Santa Fe de Antioquia
- Cathedral-Basilica of St. Martha in Santa Marta
- Cathedral of Our Lady of the Rosary in Santa Rosa de Osos
- Cathedral of St. Francis of Assisi in Sincelejo
- Catedral de Jesucristo Nuestra Paz in Soacha
- Cathedral of Our Lady of Help in Socorro
- Co-Cathedral of the Holy Cross in San Gil
- Cathedral of Our Lady of Chiquinquirá in Sonsón
- Co-Cathedral of St. Nicholas in Rionegro
- Cathedral of St. Louis Betran in Tibú
- Cathedral of the Immaculate Conception in Trinidad
- Cathedral of St. Andrew in Tumaco
- Cathedral Basilica of St. James the Apostle in Tunja
- Cathedral of Our Lady of the Rosary in Valledupar
- Cathedral of Our Lady of the Snows in Vélez
- Cathedral of Our Lady of Mount Carmel in Villavicencio
- Cathedral of St. Joseph in Yopal
- Cathedral of the Most Holy Trinity in Zipaquirá

== Anglican ==
Cathedrals of the Province 9 of the Episcopal Church in the United States of America:

- San Pablo Cathedral in Bogotá

== See also ==
- List of cathedrals
- Christianity in Colombia
