= Olavio López Duque =

Colombian Roman Catholic bishop

Olavio López Duque O.A.R.
- Vicar Apostolic of Casanare
- Church: Catholic Church
- See: Apostolic Vicariate of Casanare
- In office: 30 May 1977 – 29 October 1999
- Predecessor: Arturo Salazar Mejía
- Successor: Vicariate suppressed
- Other posts: Titular Bishop of Strongoli (1977-2013); Vicar General of Bogotá (2002-2009); Apostolic Administrator of Yopal & Trinidad (1999-2001)

Orders
- Ordination: 30 October 1955
- Consecration: 7 August 1977 by Eduardo Martínez Somalo

Personal details
- Born: 6 February 1932 Manizales, Caldas Department, Colombia
- Died: 11 June 2013 (aged 81) Bogotá, Colombia

Olavio López Duque, O.A.R. (6 February 1932 – 11 June 2013) was a Colombian Roman Catholic bishop.

Ordained to the priesthood on 30 October 1955, for the Augustinian Recollects, López Duque was named titular bishop of Strongoli and Vicar Apostolic of Casanare on 30 May 1977, and was ordained bishop on 7 August 1977. He resigned when the Vicariate Apostolic of Casanare was suppressed and became part of the Roman Catholic Diocese of Yopal.
