= Diocese of Yopal =

Diocese of the Catholic Church in Colombia

Diocese of Yopal Dioecesis Yopalensis

Catholic

Location
- Country: Colombia
- Ecclesiastical province: Tunja

Statistics
- Area: 17,725 km^{2} (6,844 sq mi)
- Population: Total; Catholics: (as of 2023); 487,000; 410,000 (84.2%)
- Parishes: 35

Information
- Denomination: Catholic Church
- Sui iuris church: Latin Church
- Rite: Roman Rite
- Established: 29 October 1999; 26 years ago
- Cathedral: Catedral San José
- Secular priests: 58 (50 Diocesan, 8 Religious Orders)

Current leadership
- Pope: Leo XIV
- Bishop: Jaime Uriel Sanabria Arias
- Metropolitan Archbishop: Gabriel Ángel Villa Vahos

Map

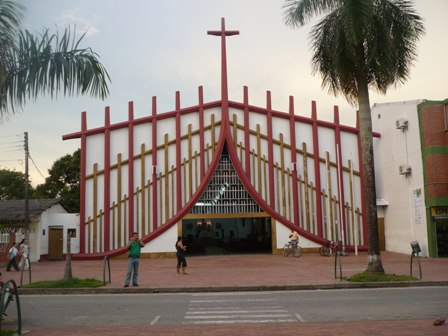
Cathedral of St. Joseph

The Diocese of Yopal (Latin: Yopalensis) is a Latin Church ecclesiastical territory or diocese of the Catholic Church in Colombia. It is a suffragan diocese in the ecclesiastical province of the metropolitan Archdiocese of Tunja.

Its cathedra is in the Catedral San José, dedicated to Saint Joseph, in the episcopal see of Yopal, Casanare Department.

== History ==
- Established on 29 October 1999 as Diocese of Yopal, on reassigned territory split off (like the Apostolic Vicariate of Trinidad) from the suppressed Apostolic Vicariate of Casanare.

== Statistics ==
As of 2023, it pastorally served 410,000 Catholics (84.2% of 487,000 total) on 17,725 km^{2} in 35 parishes with 58 priests (50 diocesan, 8 religious), 10 deacons and 21 lay religious (15 brothers, 6 sisters).

== Episcopal ordinaries ==
=== Bishops of Yopal ===
  - Apostolic Administrator Olavio López Duque, O.A.R. (1999.10.29 – 2001.09.01), Vicar Apostolic Emeritus of Casanare
- Misael Vacca Ramírez (2001.04.24 – 2015.04.15), appointed Bishop of Duitama–Sogamoso
- Edgar Aristizábal Quintero (2017.05.04 – 2024.05.24), appointed Bishop of Duitama–Sogamoso
- Jaime Uriel Sanabria Arias (2026.06.29 – Present)

== See also ==
- List of Catholic dioceses in Colombia
- Roman Catholicism in Colombia

== Sources and external links ==
- GCatholic.org - data for all sections
