= Diocese of Duitama–Sogamoso =

Diocese of the Catholic Church in Colombia

Coordinates: 5.8281°N 73.0340°W

Diocese of Duitama–Sogamoso Dioecesis Duitamensis-Sogamosensis

Catholic

Location
- Country: Colombia
- Ecclesiastical province: Tunja

Statistics
- Area: 4,400 km^{2} (1,700 sq mi)
- Population: Total; Catholics: (as of 2006); 394,000; 375,000 (95.2%)

Information
- Rite: Latin Rite
- Established: 7 March 1955 (71 years ago)
- Cathedral: Catedral de San Lorenzo
- Co-cathedral: Catedral de San Martín

Current leadership
- Pope: Leo XIV
- Bishop: Edgar Aristizábal Quintero

Map

Website
- diocesisdeduitamasogamoso.org

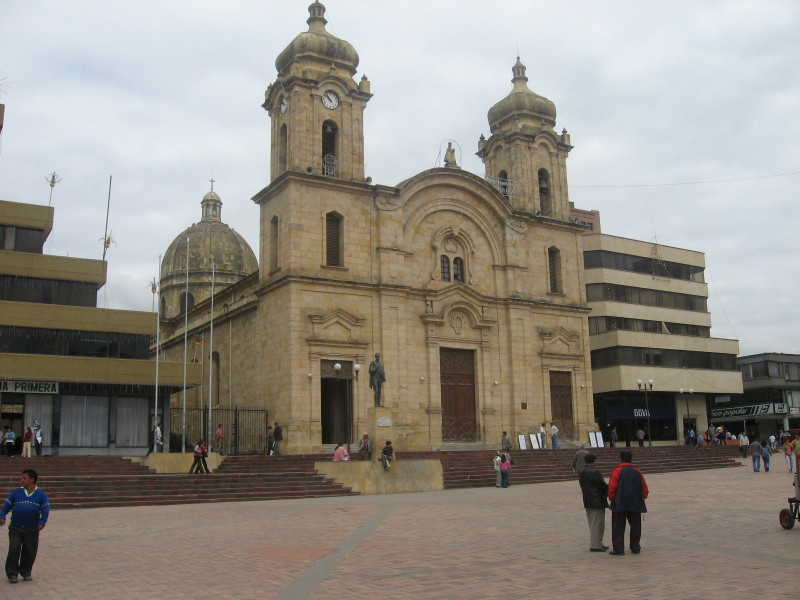
Cathedral of St. Lawrence, Duitama

The Roman Catholic Diocese of Duitama–Sogamoso (Latin: Duitamensis– Sogamosensis) is a diocese located in the cities of Duitama and Sogamoso in the ecclesiastical province of Tunja in Colombia.

== History ==
- 7 March 1955: Established as Diocese of Duitama from Diocese of Tunja
- 4 June 1994: Renamed as Diocese of Duitama – Sogamoso

== Special churches ==
- Minor Basilicas:
  - Basilica de Mongui, Duitama

== Bishops ==
=== Ordinaries ===
- José Joaquín Flórez Hernández † (7 Mar 1955 – 17 Mar 1964) Appointed, Bishop of Ibagué
- Julio Franco Arango † (4 Jun 1964 – 16 Sep 1980) Died
- Jesús María Coronado Caro, S.D.B. † (30 Jul 1981 – 21 Jun 1994) Retired
- Carlos Prada Sanmiguel † (21 Jun 1994 Appointed – 15 Oct 2012) Resigned
- Misael Vacca Ramirez (18 Apr 2015 Appointed - 31 Dec 2022) Appointed, Archbishop of Villavicencio
- Edgar Aristizábal Quintero (24 May 2024 Appointed - )

=== Other priest of this diocese who became bishop ===
- Marco Antonio Merchán Ladino, appointed Bishop of Vélez in 2016

== See also ==
- Roman Catholicism in Colombia
