= Roman Catholic Diocese of Cartago =

The Roman Catholic Diocese of Cartago may refer to:

- Roman Catholic Diocese of Cartago in Costa Rica
- Roman Catholic Diocese of Cartago in Colombia
