= Julio Franco (disambiguation) =

Julio Franco is a former Major League Baseball player from the Dominican Republic

Julio Franco may also refer to:

- Julio Franco Arango (1914–1980), Colombian Roman Catholic bishop
- Julio César Franco (politician) (born 1951), Paraguayan politician
- Julio César Franco (footballer) (born 1965), Paraguayan footballer
