= Diocese of Sincelejo =

Diocese of the Catholic Church in Colombia

Diocese of Sincelejo Dioecesis Sinceleiensis

Catholic

Location
- Country: Colombia
- Ecclesiastical province: Cartagena

Statistics
- Area: 10,523 km^{2} (4,063 sq mi)
- Population: Total; Catholics: (as of 2004); 839,770; 671,816 (80.0%)

Information
- Rite: Latin Rite
- Established: 25 April 1969 (57 years ago)
- Cathedral: St. Francis of Assisi Cathedral

Current leadership
- Pope: Leo XIV
- Bishop: José Crispiano Clavijo Méndez
- Metropolitan Archbishop: Francisco Javier Múnera Correa, C.I.M.

Map

The Roman Catholic Diocese of Sincelejo (Latin: Sinceleiensis) is a diocese located in the city of Sincelejo in the ecclesiastical province of Cartagena in Colombia.

== History ==
- 25 April 1969: Established as Diocese of Sincelejo from the Metropolitan Archdiocese of Cartagena

== Special churches ==
- Minor Basilicas:
  - Señor de los Milagros in Sincelejo (Lord of Miracles)

== Ordinaries ==
- Félix María Torres Parra (1969.04.25 – 1980.12.11) Appointed, Bishop of Santa Marta
- Héctor Jaramillo Duque, S.D.B. (1981.08.03 – 1990.09.16)
- Nel Hedye Beltrán Santamaria (1992.04.29 – 2014.03.15)
- José Crispiano Clavijo Méndez (2015.02.19 - present)

== See also ==
- Roman Catholicism in Colombia
