= Carlos Prada Sanmiguel =

Colombian Roman Catholic bishop

- Bishop of Duitama–Sogamoso
- Church: Catholic Church
- Diocese: Diocese of Duitama–Sogamoso
- In office: 21 June 1994 – 15 October 2012
- Predecessor: Jesús María Coronado Caro
- Successor: Misael Vacca Ramirez
- Previous posts: Titular Bishop of Baliana (1988-1994); Auxiliary Bishop of Medellín (1988-1994)

Orders
- Ordination: 6 February 1966
- Consecration: 20 February 1988 by Alfonso López Trujillo

Personal details
- Born: 27 December 1939 Floridablanca, Santander Department, Colombia
- Died: 16 August 2013 (aged 73)

Carlos Prada Sanmiguel (27 December 1939 − 16 August 2013) was a Colombian Roman Catholic bishop.

Ordained to the priesthood in 1966, Prada Sanmiguel was named bishop in 1988. In 1994, he was named bishop of the Roman Catholic Diocese of Duitama–Sogamoso, Colombia and resigned in 2012.
