= St. Francis of Assisi Cathedral, Sincelejo =

St. Francis of Assisi Cathedral
- Catedral de San Francisco de Asís
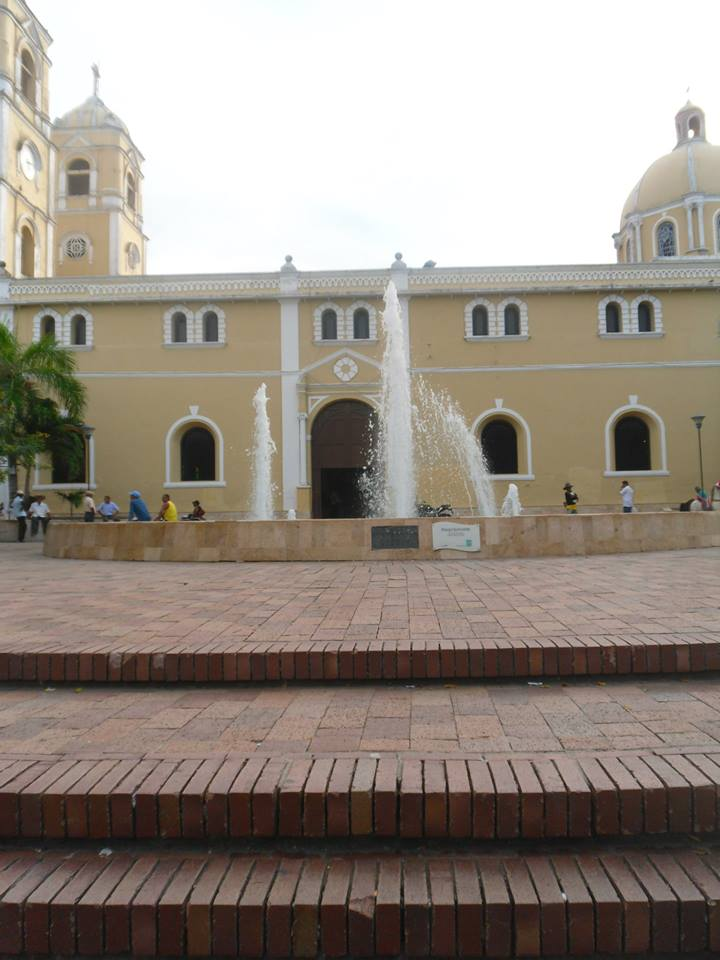
- St. Francis of Assisi Cathedral
- 9°18′10″N 75°23′42″W
- Location: Sincelejo
- Country: Colombia
- Denomination: Roman Catholic Church

Administration
- Diocese: Roman Catholic Diocese of Sincelejo

The St. Francis of Assisi Cathedral (Spanish: Catedral de San Francisco de Asís) Also Sincelejo Cathedral Is the name given to a cathedral church belonging to the Catholic Church and consecrated to St. Francis of Assisi. It is located in Santander Square in the city of Sincelejo (Colombia), capital of the Department of Sucre.

The cathedral follows the Roman or Latin rite and is the seat of the Diocese of Sincelejo (Dioecesis Sinceleiensis) that was created in 1969 through the bull "Ad Ecclesiam Christi" of Pope Paul VI.

It is under the pastoral responsibility of Bishop José Crispiano Clavijo Méndez.

== See also ==
- List of cathedrals in Colombia
- Roman Catholicism in Colombia
- St. Francis of Assisi
