= Gregorio Garavito Jiménez =

20th-century Catholic Archbishop of Villavicencio

Gregorio Garavito Jiménez, S.M.M.
- Archiocese of Villavicencio
- Church: Catholic Church
- See: Archiocese of Villavicencio
- In office: 1969–1994
- Predecessor: Frans Joseph Bruls Canisius
- Successor: Alfonso Cabezas Aristizábal
- Previous post: Priest

Orders
- Ordination: July 24, 1942

Personal details
- Born: March 9, 1919 Junín, Colombia
- Died: February 16, 2016 (aged 96)

Gregorio Garavito Jiménez S.M.M. (March 9, 1919 – February 16, 2016) was a Colombian bishop of the Catholic Church. At the time of his death, he was one of oldest Colombian Catholic bishops.

Garavito was born in Junín, Colombia and was ordained a priest on July 24, 1942, from the religious order of Missionaries of the Company of Mary. Monsignor Garavito was appointed auxiliary bishop of the Archdiocese of Villavicencio as well as titular bishop of Cyparissia on December 4, 1961, and consecrated on February 11, 1962.

He was appointed archbishop of the Archiocese of Villavicencio on April 26, 1969, and retired on May 3, 1994.
