= Our Lady of Mount Carmel Cathedral, Valle del Cauca =

Coordinates: 4.7486°N 75.9159°W

Our Lady of Mount Carmel Cathedral
- Catedral de Nuestra Señora del Carmen
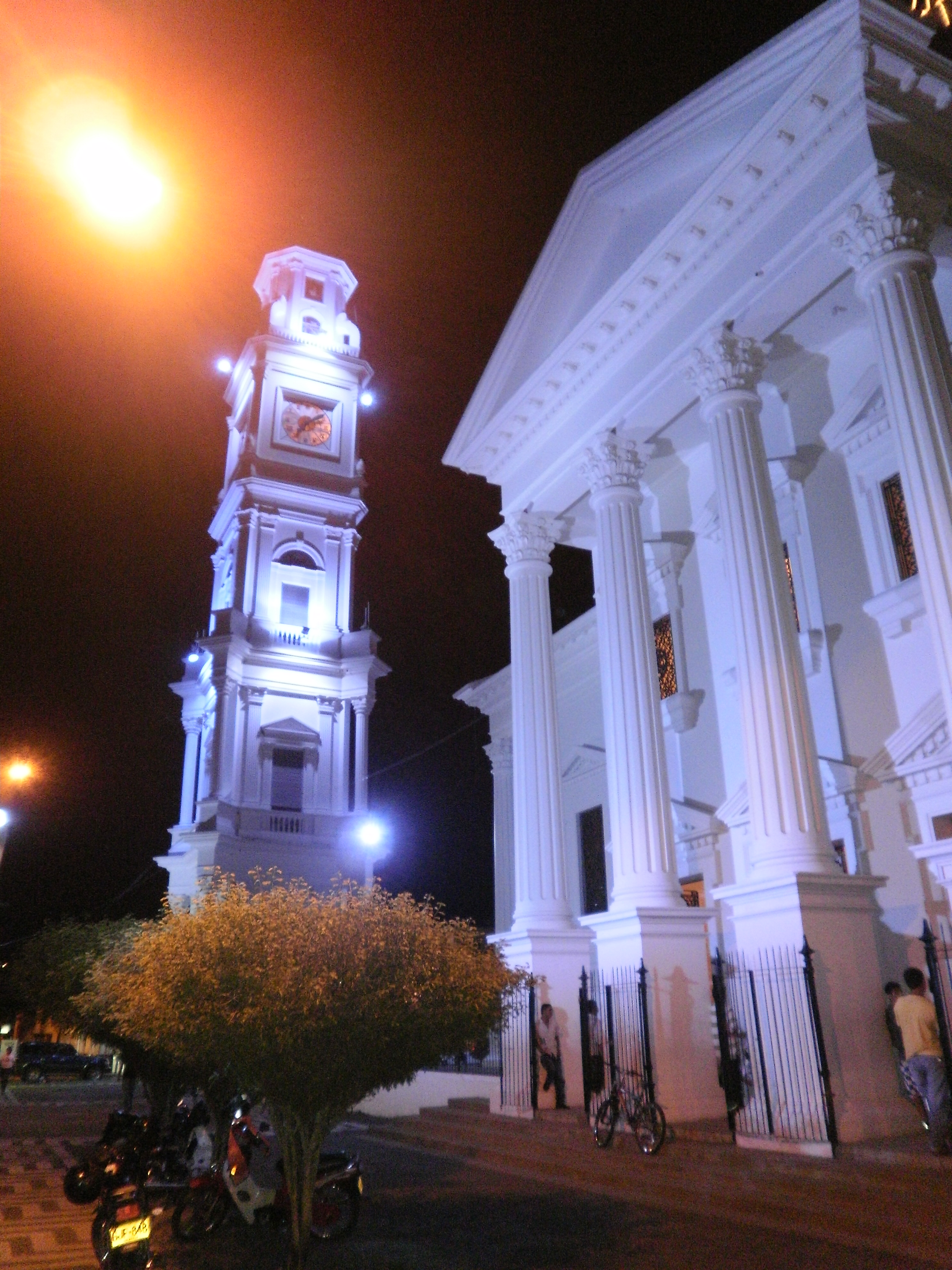
- Our Lady of Mount Carmel Cathedral
- Location: Cartago
- Country: Colombia
- Denomination: Roman Catholic Church

Administration
- Diocese: Roman Catholic Diocese of Cartago in Colombia

The Our Lady of Mount Carmel Cathedral (Spanish: Catedral de Nuestra Señora del Carmen) or Cartago Cathedral is a Catholic cathedral, located in the corner of the fifth Street with fourteen street, two blocks from the Park of Bolivar, in the city of Cartago, Valle del Cauca, Colombia. What stands out most of the cathedral, is that its tower is separated twenty meters from the rest of the church. It is of Neoclassical style, replicating that of the St. Peter’s Basilica in Rome.

Built initially in the middle of the fourteenth century as a chapel to honor the Blessed Virgin Mary under the title of Our Lady of Mount Carmel. It is remembered historically for having been the site of prayer of the ragdales cartagüeños, who fervently celebrate their feast every year.

On January 22, 2012, the Cathedral housed the relic of Saint John Paul II (a sample of his blood) brought from Rome by Monsignor Slawomir Oder, as part of the meeting with victims of violence in Colombia. With this visit was fulfilled what for many believers is considered the second visit of the pope to the country since 1986.

== See also ==
- List of cathedrals in Colombia
- Roman Catholicism in Colombia
- Our Lady of Mount Carmel
