= Diocese of Garagoa =

Diocese of the Catholic Church in Colombia

Coordinates: 5.0818°N 73.3639°W

Diocese of Garagoa Dioecesis Garagoënsis

Catholic

Location
- Country: Colombia
- Ecclesiastical province: Tunja

Statistics
- Area: 4,400 km^{2} (1,700 sq mi)
- Population: Total; Catholics: (as of 2004); 157,500; 155,500 (98.7%)

Information
- Denomination: Catholic Church
- Sui iuris church: Latin Church
- Rite: Roman Rite
- Established: 26 April 1977 (49 years ago)
- Cathedral: Catedral de Nuestra Señora del Rosario de Chiquinquirá

Current leadership
- Pope: Leo XIV
- Bishop: Julio Hernando García Peláez

Map

Website
- www.diocesisdegaragoa.org

The Diocese of Garagoa (Latin: Garagoënsis) is a Latin Church ecclesiastical territory or diocese of the Catholic Church Colombia. It is a suffragan diocese in the ecclesiastical province of the metropolitan Archdiocese of Tunja.

Its cathedral is Catedral de Nuestra Señora del Rosario de Chiquinquirá, dedicated to Our Lady of the Rosary, in the episcopal see of Garagoa, Boyacá Department.

== History ==
- 26 April 1977: Established as Diocese of Garagoa, on territory split off from its metropolitan, the Archdiocese of Tunja.

== Statistics ==
As of 2014, it pastorally served 174,000 Catholics (97.8% of 178,000 total) on 4,400 km² in 31 parishes and 2 missions with 48 priests (47 diocesan, 1 religious), 39 lay religious (1 brother, 38 sisters) and 12 seminarians.

== Bishops ==
=== Episcopal ordinaries ===
Suffragan Bishops of Garagoa

- Juan Eliseo Mojica Oliveros (1977.04.26 – death 1989.12.27), previously Titular Bishop of Baliana (1967.02.20 – 1970.06.04) as Auxiliary Bishop of Archdiocese of Tunja (Colombia) (1967.02.20 – 1970.06.04)
- Guillermo Alvaro Ortiz Carrillo (1989.12.27 – death 2000.02.24), previously Bishop of Jericó (Colombia) (1970.06.04 – 1977.04.26)
- José Vicente Huertas Vargas (2000.06.23 – retired 2017.06.15)
- Julio Hernando García Peláez (2017.06.15 – ...); previously Titular Bishop of Bida (2005.02.11 – 2010.06.05) as Auxiliary Bishop of Archdiocese of Cali (Colombia) (2005.02.11 – 2010.06.05), Bishop of Istmina–Tadó (Colombia) (2010.06.05 – 2017.06.15) and Apostolic Administrator of Quibdó (Colombia) (2011.03 – 2013.01.30).

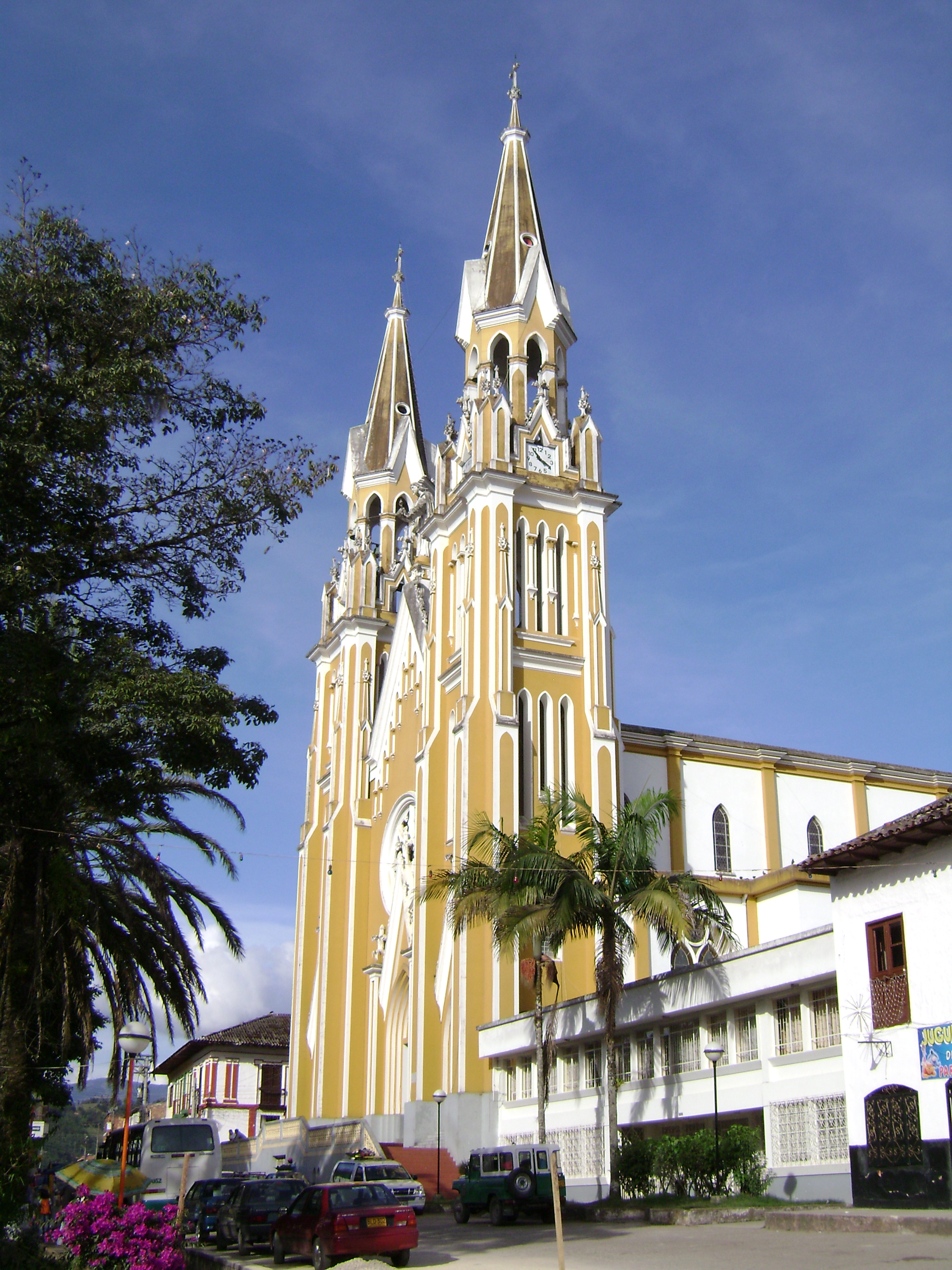
Cathedral of Our Lady of the Rosary

=== Coadjutor bishop ===
- Guillermo Álvaro Ortiz Carrillo (1989)

=== Other priests of this diocese who became bishops ===
- Misael Vacca Ramirez, appointed Bishop of Yopal in 2001
- Luis Felipe Sánchez Aponte, appointed Bishop of Chiquinquirá in 2004

== See also ==
- List of Catholic dioceses in Colombia
- Roman Catholicism in Colombia

== Sources and external links ==
- GCatholic.org, with Google map - data for all sections
