= Our Lady of Remedies Cathedral, Riohacha =

Our Lady of Remedies Cathedral
- Catedral de Nuestra Señora de los Remedios
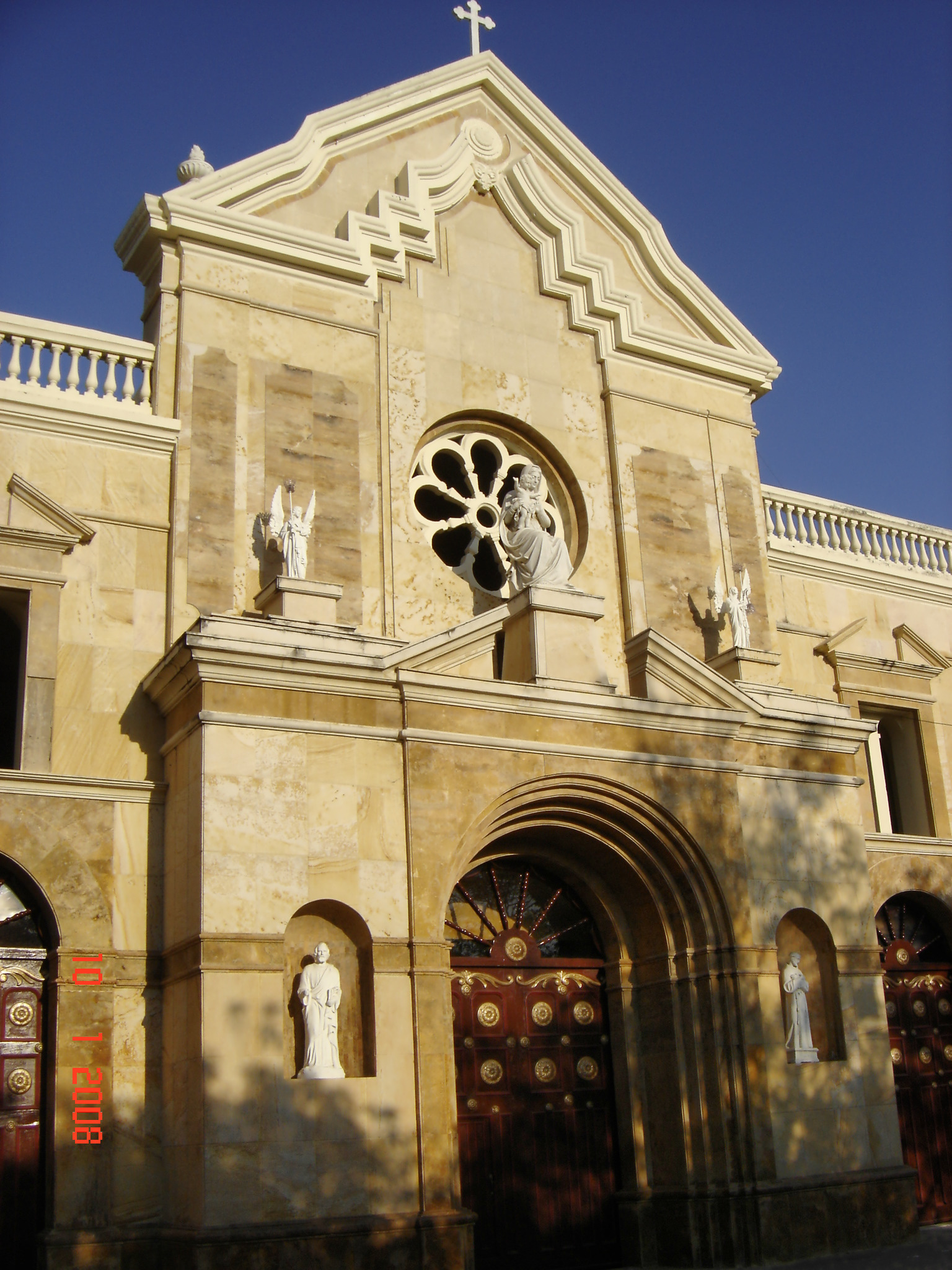
- Our Lady of Remedies Cathedral
- Location: Riohacha
- Country: Colombia
- Denomination: Roman Catholic Church

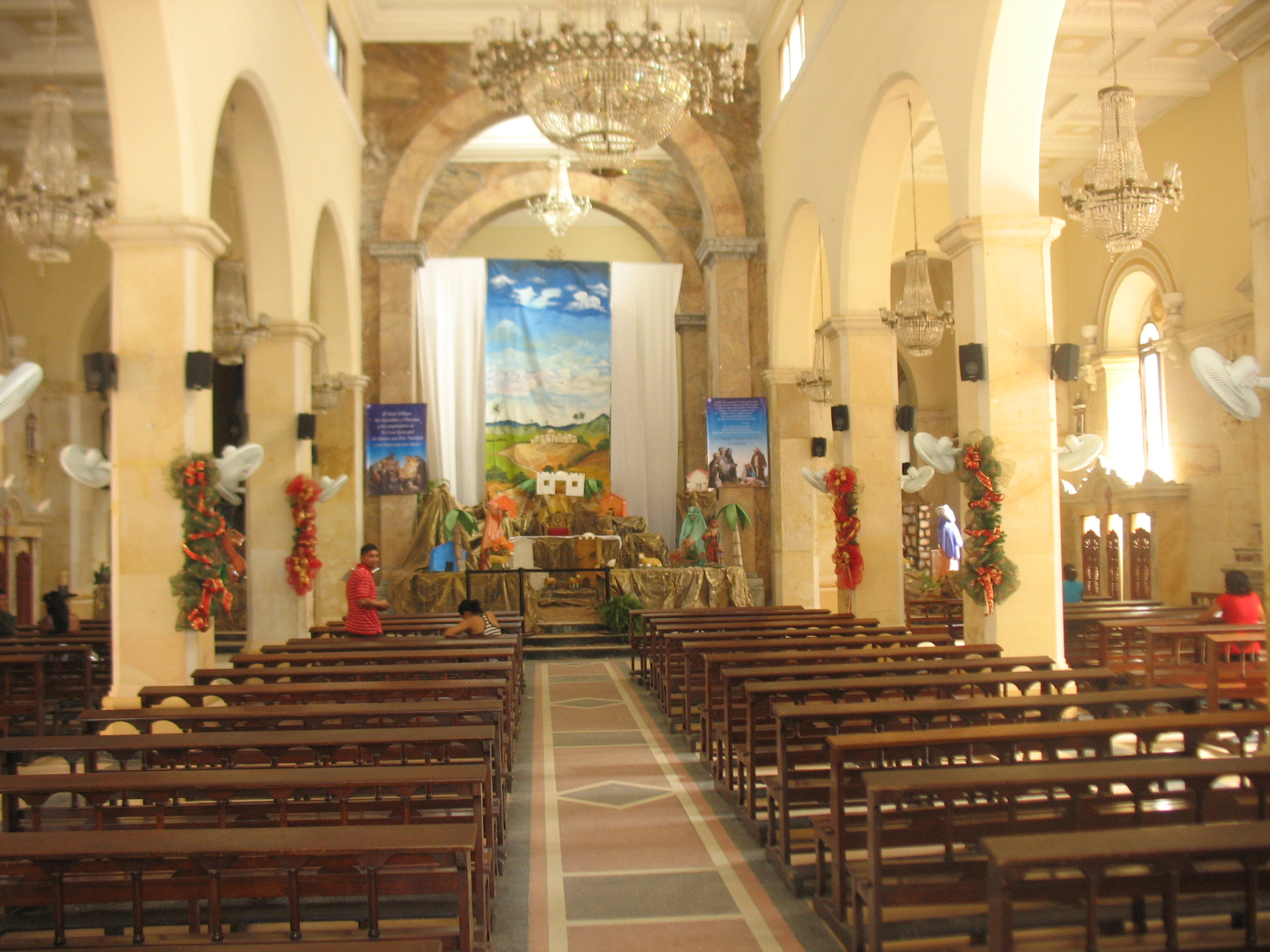
Internal view

The Our Lady of Remedies Cathedral (Spanish: Catedral de Nuestra Señora de los Remedios), also known as Riohacha Cathedral, is a cathedral of the Catholic Church consecrated to the Virgin of the Remedies. It is the headquarters of the Roman Catholic Diocese of Riohacha and, therefore, seat of the titular Bishop.

It is a colonial style building located on Second Street, 7-13 in the city of Riohacha, in the department of La Guajira, in the extreme north of the South American country of Colombia.

It was built between 1835 and 1852. In 1906 the facade was rebuilt, preventing collapse of the walls and giving it a more artistic and marked style. The four marble altars were placed next to the main altar, above which a dome was raised.

== See also ==
- Roman Catholicism in Colombia
- Festivities of Our Lady of the Remedies, local festival
- List of cathedrals in Colombia
