= Roman Catholic Diocese of Pasto =

Diocese of the Catholic Church in Colombia

Diocese of Pasto Dioecesis Pastopolitana

Catholic

Location
- Country: Colombia
- Ecclesiastical province: Popayán

Statistics
- Area: 6,813 km^{2} (2,631 sq mi)
- Population: Total; Catholics: (as of 2023); 852,797; 714,539 (83.8%)

Information
- Rite: Latin Rite
- Established: 10 April 1859 (167 years ago)
- Cathedral: St. Ezequiel Moreno Cathedral, Pasto

Current leadership
- Pope: Leo XIV
- Bishop: Juan Carlos Cárdenas Toro
- Bishops emeritus: Julio Enrique Prado Bolaños

Map

Website
- www.diocesisdepasto.com

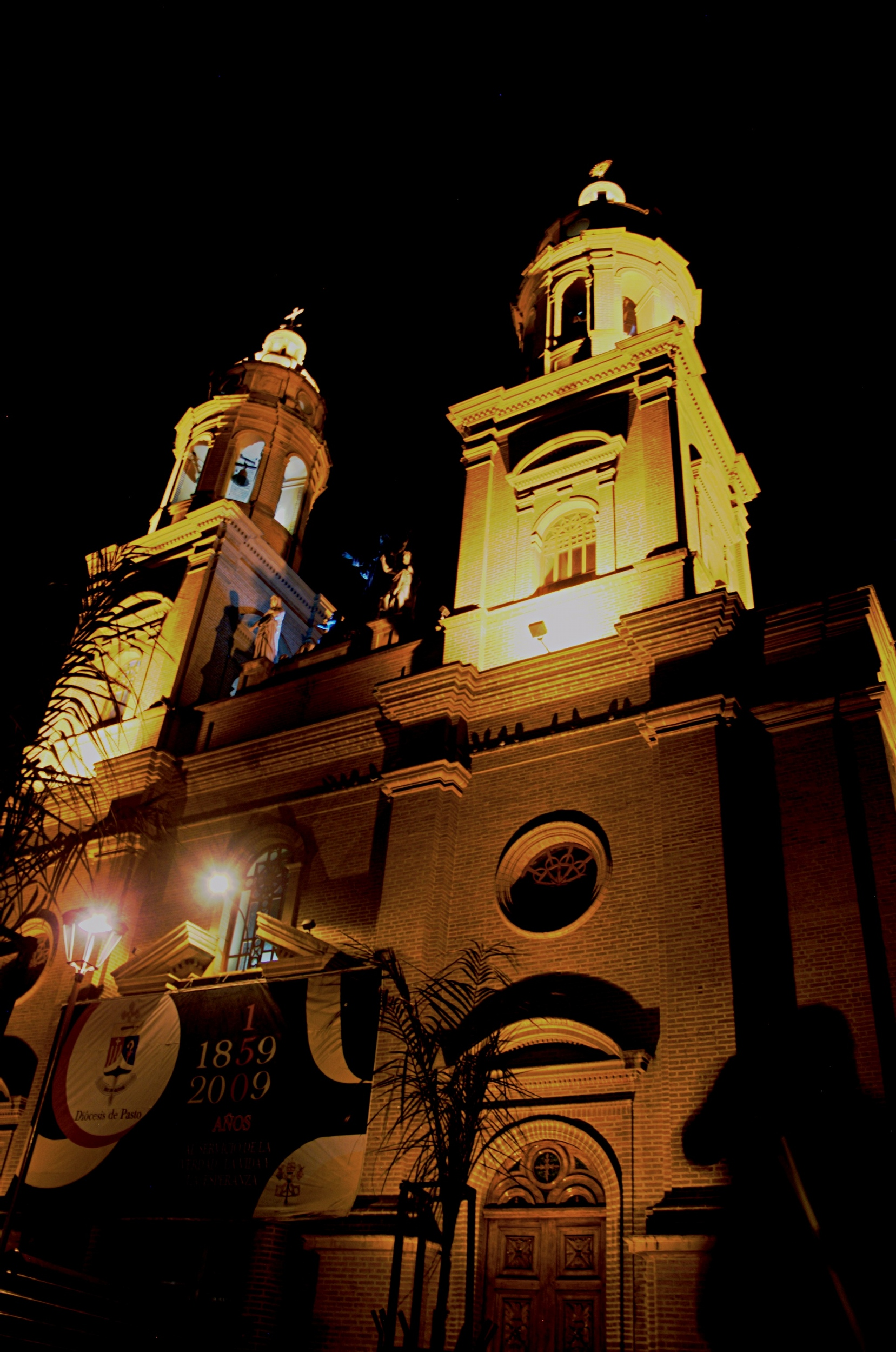
Cathedral of St. Ezequiel Moreno Díaz

The Roman Catholic Diocese of Pasto (Latin: Dioecesis Pastopolitana) is a diocese located in the city of Pasto in the ecclesiastical province of Popayán in Colombia.

== History ==
- 10 April 1859: Established as Diocese of Pasto from the Diocese of Popayán

== Ordinaries ==
- José Elías Puyana † (15 Apr 1859 – 20 Nov 1864) Died
- Juan Manuel García Tejada † (6 Jan 1866 – 23 Oct 1869) Died
- Manuel Canuto Restrepo † (21 Mar 1870 – 1881) Resigned
- Ignacio León Velasco, S.J. † (15 Mar 1883 – 27 May 1889) Appointed, Archbishop of Santafé en Nueva Granada
- Joaquín Pardo y Vergara † (4 Jun 1891 – 1 Feb 1892) Appointed, Bishop of Medellín
- Manuel José Caicedo Martínez † (1 Feb 1892 – 2 Dec 1895) Appointed, Bishop of Popayán
- St. Ezequiel Moreno y Díaz, O.A.R. † (2 Dec 1895 – 19 Aug 1906) Died
- Adolfo Perea † (16 Dec 1907 – Apr 1911) Died
- Leonidas Medina † (23 Jan 1912 – 27 Mar 1916) Appointed, Auxiliary Bishop of Bogotá
- Antonio María Pueyo de Val, C.M.F. † (26 Nov 1917 – 9 Oct 1929) Died
- Hipólito Leopoldo Agudelo † (2 Sep 1930 – 23 May 1933) Died
- Diego María Gómez Tamayo † (1 Feb 1934 – 22 Apr 1944) Appointed, Archbishop of Popayán
- Emilio Botero González † (30 Aug 1947 – 21 Aug 1961) Died
- Jorge Alberto Giraldo Restrepo, C.I.M. † (21 Nov 1961 – 1 Jul 1976) Died
- Arturo Salazar Mejia, O.A.R. † (3 Jan 1977 – 2 Feb 1995) Resigned
- Julio Enrique Prado Bolaños (2 Feb 1995 – 1 Oct 2020) Retired
- Juan Carlos Cárdenas Toro (1 Oct 2020 – present)

== Auxiliary bishops ==
- José de Jesús Pimiento Rodríguez (1955–1959) Appointed, Bishop of Monteria; future Cardinal
- Jorge Alberto Giraldo Restrepo, C.I.M. (1960-1961), appointed Bishop here

== See also ==
- Roman Catholicism in Colombia
