= Jesús María Coronado Caro =

Jesús María Coronado Caro, S.D.B.
- Bishop of Diocese of Duitama-Sogamoso
- Church: Roman Catholic Church
- See: Diocese of Duitama-Sogamoso
- In office: 1981–1994
- Predecessor: Julio Franco Arango
- Successor: Carlos Prada Sanmiguel
- Previous post(s): Priest

Orders
- Ordination: August 31, 1947

Personal details
- Born: January 18, 1918; Cienega, Colombia
- Died: December 31, 2010 (aged 92)

Jesús María Coronado Caro S.D.B. (January 18, 1918 – December 31, 2010) was a Colombian Prelate of Roman Catholic Church.

== Biography ==
He was born in Cienega, Colombia and ordained a priest on August 31, 1947, from the religious order of Salesians of Don Bosco. He was appointed as prefect to the Ariari on January 19, 1964, and as bishop of the Diocese of Girardot on February 10, 1973. His ordainment as bishop occurred on March 24, 1973. He was then appointed to Diocese of Duitama-Sogamoso on July 30, 1981, and retired from diocese on June 21, 1994. He died 31 December 2010 at the age of 92.
