= Julio Enrique Prado Bolaños =

Colombian catholic priest

- Bishop Emeritus of Pasto
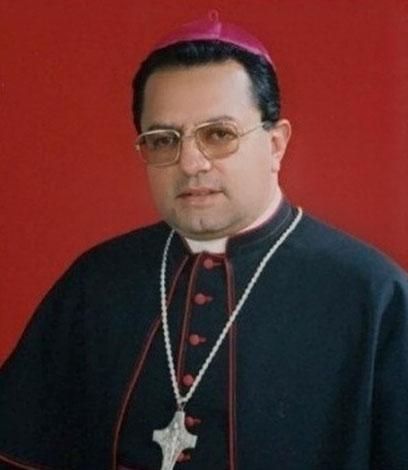
- Church: Catholic Church
- Diocese: Diocese of Pasto
- In office: 2 February 1995 – 1 October 2020
- Predecessor: Arturo Salazar Mejía
- Successor: Juan Carlos Cárdenas Toro
- Other post: Apostolic Administrator of Tumaco (2015-2017)
- Previous posts: Titular Bishop of Furnos Maior (1992-1995); Auxiliary Bishop of Cali (1992-1995)

Orders
- Ordination: 3 December 1967 by Alonso Arteaga Yepes
- Consecration: 22 August 1992 by Gustavo Martínez Frías

Personal details
- Born: 21 November 1943 (age 82) Cumbal, Nariño Department, Colombia

Julio Enrique Prado Bolaños (born 21 November 1943, Cumbal) is a Colombian priest and bishop who serves as bishop emeritus of Pasto.

== Biography ==
He entered the Sacred Hearts Seminary in Pasto, where he studied Philosophy and Theology. He earned a degree in Theology from the Pontifical Javeriana University in Bogotá, and specialized in Philosophy and Humanism at Santo Tomás University.

== Episcopate ==
=== Auxiliary Bishop of Cali ===
Pope John Paul II, on 8 July 1992, appointed him auxiliary bishop of Cali, and on 22 August of the same year he received episcopal ordination in the cathedral of Ipiales, from the bishop of that city, Gustavo Martínez Frías. The pope appointed him titular bishop of Furnos Maior.

=== Bishop of Pasto ===
He was assigned to the Diocese of Pasto on 2 February 1995.

A promoter of social, cultural, and religious works, he is best known for founding the Catholic University of the South in 2018, a significant contribution to education in Nariño.
