= Arturo Salazar Mejía =

Colombian Catholic prelate

Arturo Salazar Mejía O.A.R.
- Bishop of Pasto
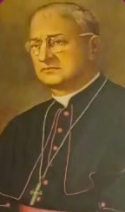
- Church: Catholic Church
- Diocese: Diocese of Pasto
- In office: 3 January 1977 – 2 February 1995
- Predecessor: Jorge Alberto Giraldo Restrepo
- Successor: Julio Enrique Prado Bolaños
- Previous posts: Titular Bishop of Avitta Bibba (1965-1977); Vicar Apostolic of Casanare (1965-1977)

Orders
- Ordination: 6 February 1944
- Consecration: 9 January 1966 by Giuseppe Paupini

Personal details
- Born: 11 April 1921 Salamina, Caldas Department, Colombia
- Died: 1 November 2009 (aged 88)
- Coat of arms

Arturo Salazar Mejía, OAR (11 April 1921 – 1 November 2009) was the Colombian Catholic prelate who served as Bishop of Pasto from 1977 to 1995. He was a member of the Order of Augustinian Recollects.

== Biography ==
Mejía was born on 11 April 1921, in Salamina, Colombia.

He was ordained on 6 February 1944, and become a priest of the Order of Augustinian Recollects.

On 14 October 1965, Salazar Mejía was appointed both Vicar Apostolic of the Apostolic Vicariate of Casanare in Casanare, Colombia, and the Titular Bishop of Avitta Bibba. Less than one year later, Mejía was ordained as bishop by Pope Paul VI on 9 January 1966.

Mejía was the Titular Bishop of Avitta Bibba from 1965-1977, when he was appointed Bishop of Pasto on 3 January 1977.

Mejía remained Bishop of Pasto until he retired on 6 February 1995. He was succeeded by Julio Enrique Prado Bolaños.

Mejía died on 1 November 2009.
