= Our Lady of Mount Carmel Cathedral, Villavicencio =

Our Lady of Mount Carmel Cathedral
- Catedral de Nuestra Señora del Carmen
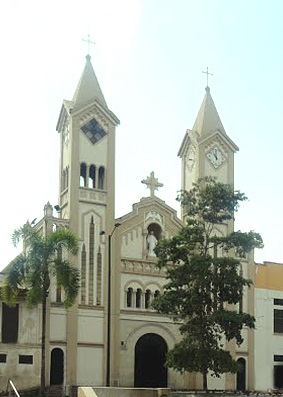
- Our Lady of Mount Carmel Cathedral
- Location: Villavicencio
- Country: Colombia
- Denomination: Roman Catholic Church

Administration
- Archdiocese: Roman Catholic Archdiocese of Villavicencio

The Our Lady of Mount Carmel Cathedral (Spanish: Catedral de Nuestra Señora del Carmen) Also Villavicencio Cathedral Is a cathedral of the Catholic church located in the Colombian city of Villavicencio, capital of the department of Meta. The temple is dedicated to the Virgin Mary under the invocation of the Virgin of Mount Carmel (Virgen del Carmen).

It is the mother church of the Archdiocese of Villavicencio and was elevated to cathedral on February 11, 1964, by the bull of Pope Paul VI.

In 1845 the priest of San Martín, Ignacio Osorio, passed through the town of Gramalote (formerly the city of Villavicencio), who insinuated and convinced the villagers that a chapel should be built which, besides being a refuge for Catholics And believers, would initiate the demarcation of a square that symbolizes the population.

The initiative was welcomed by the inhabitants of the place who offered to build it. Three years later, in 1848, the priest returned and found the work finished rudimentarily; He blessed her by putting her under the shelter of Our Lady of Carmen.

A fire destroyed the cathedral in 1890. The current building was rebuilt in 1894.

== See also ==
- List of cathedrals in Colombia
- Roman Catholicism in Colombia
- Our Lady of Mount Carmel
