= Diocese of Granada en Colombia =

Diocese of the Catholic Church in Colombia

Coordinates: 3.5417°N 73.7074°W

Diocese of Granada en Colombia Dioecesis Granadiensis in Columbia

Catholic

Location
- Country: Colombia
- Ecclesiastical province: Villavicencio

Statistics
- Area: 35,000 km^{2} (14,000 sq mi)
- Population: Total; Catholics: (as of 2004); 200,000; 150,000 (75.0%)

Information
- Rite: Latin Rite
- Established: 16 January 1964 (62 years ago)
- Cathedral: Catedral de Nuestra Señora del Carmen

Current leadership
- Pope: Leo XIV
- Bishop: Jorge Enrique Malpica Bejarano
- Bishops emeritus: José Figueroa Gómez

Map

Website
- www.diocesisdegranadaencolombia.net

The Roman Catholic Diocese of Granada en Colombia (Latin: Granadiensis in Columbia) is a diocese located in the city of Granada in the ecclesiastical province of Villavicencio in Colombia.

== History ==
- 16 January 1964: Established as Apostolic Prefecture of Ariari from the Apostolic Vicariate of Villavicencio
- 3 October 1987: Promoted as Apostolic Vicariate of Ariari
- 29 October 1999: Promoted as Diocese of Granada

== Ordinaries ==
- Prefects Apostolic of Ariari (Roman rite)
  - Bishop Jesús María Coronado Caro, S.D.B. (1964.01.16 – 1973.02.10), appointed Bishop of Girardot
  - Bishop Héctor Jaramillo Duque, S.D.B. (1973.09.14 – 1981.08.03), appointed Bishop of Sincelejo
  - Fr. Luís Carlos Riveros Lavado, S.D.B. (1982.03.05 – 1986.09.27)
- Vicar Apostolic of Ariari (Roman rite)
  - Bishop Héctor Julio López Hurtado, S.D.B. (1987.12.15 – 1999.10.29)
- Bishops of Granada en Colombia (Roman rite)
  - Bishop Héctor Julio López Hurtado, S.D.B. (1999.10.29 – 2001.06.15), appointed Bishop of Girardot
  - Bishop José Figueroa Gómez (2002.08.08 – 2025.05.31)
  - Jorge Enrique Malpica Bejarano (2025.05.31 – present)

== See also ==
- Roman Catholicism in Colombia
