= Diocese of Girardota =

Diocese of the Catholic Church in Colombia

Coordinates: 6.3770°N 75.4461°W

Diocese of Girardota Dioecesis Girardotanensis

Catholic

Location
- Country: Colombia
- Ecclesiastical province: Medellín

Statistics
- Area: 2,445 km^{2} (944 sq mi)
- Population: Total; Catholics: (as of 2023); 193,252; 186,850 (96.7%)
- Parishes: 33

Information
- Denomination: Catholic Church
- Sui iuris church: Latin Church
- Rite: Roman Rite
- Established: 18 June 1988; 38 years ago
- Cathedral: Our Lady of the Rosary Cathedral
- Secular priests: 68 (66 Diocesan, 2 Religious Orders)

Current leadership
- Pope: Leo XIV
- Bishop: Juan Manuel Toro Vallejo
- Metropolitan Archbishop: Ricardo Tobón Restrepo
- Bishops emeritus: Guillermo Orozco Montoya

Map

Website
- www.diogirardota.org.co

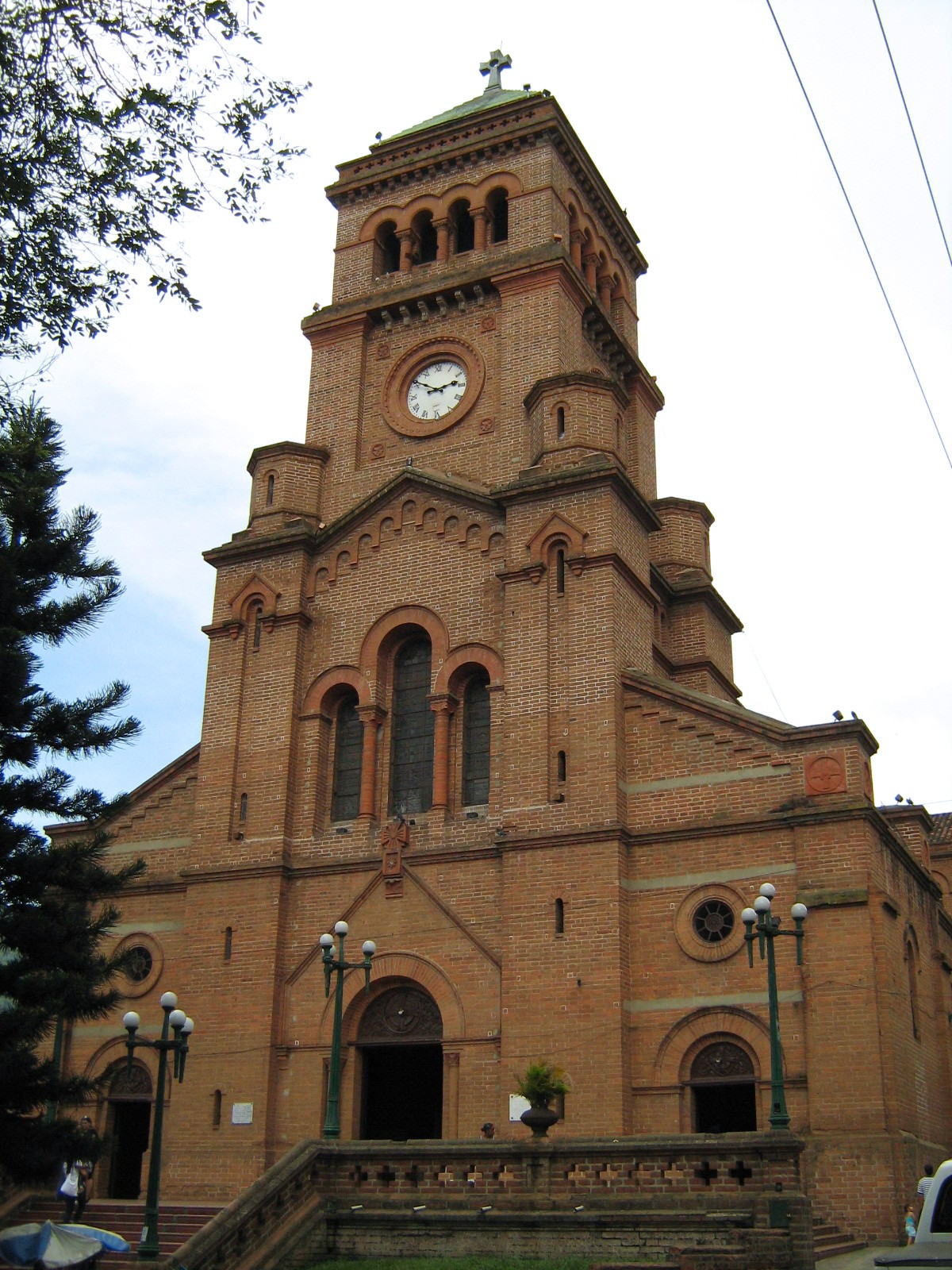
Cathedral of Our Lady of the Rosary

The Roman Catholic Diocese of Girardota (Latin: Girardotanensis) is a diocese located in the city of Girardota in the ecclesiastical province of Medellín in Colombia.

== History ==
- 18 June 1988: Established as Diocese of Girardota from Metropolitan Archdiocese of Medellín

== Ordinaries ==
Bishops of Girardota (Roman Rite)

- Óscar Ángel Bernal (18 Jun 1988 – 4 Jul 1996)
- Héctor Ignacio Salah Zuleta (21 Feb 1998 – 13 May 2005), appointed Bishop of Riohacha
- Óscar González Villa (24 Apr 2006 – 10 Jun 2006), resigned before episcopal ordination
- Gonzalo Restrepo Restrepo (11 Jul 2006 – 16 Jul 2009), appointed Coadjutor Archbishop of Manizales
- Guillermo Orozco Montoya (2 Feb 2010 – 21 Mar 2024), retired
- Juan Manuel Toro Vallejo (21 Mar 2024 – Present)

== See also ==
- Roman Catholicism in Colombia
