= Plaza de la Paz, Barranquilla =

Peace Square
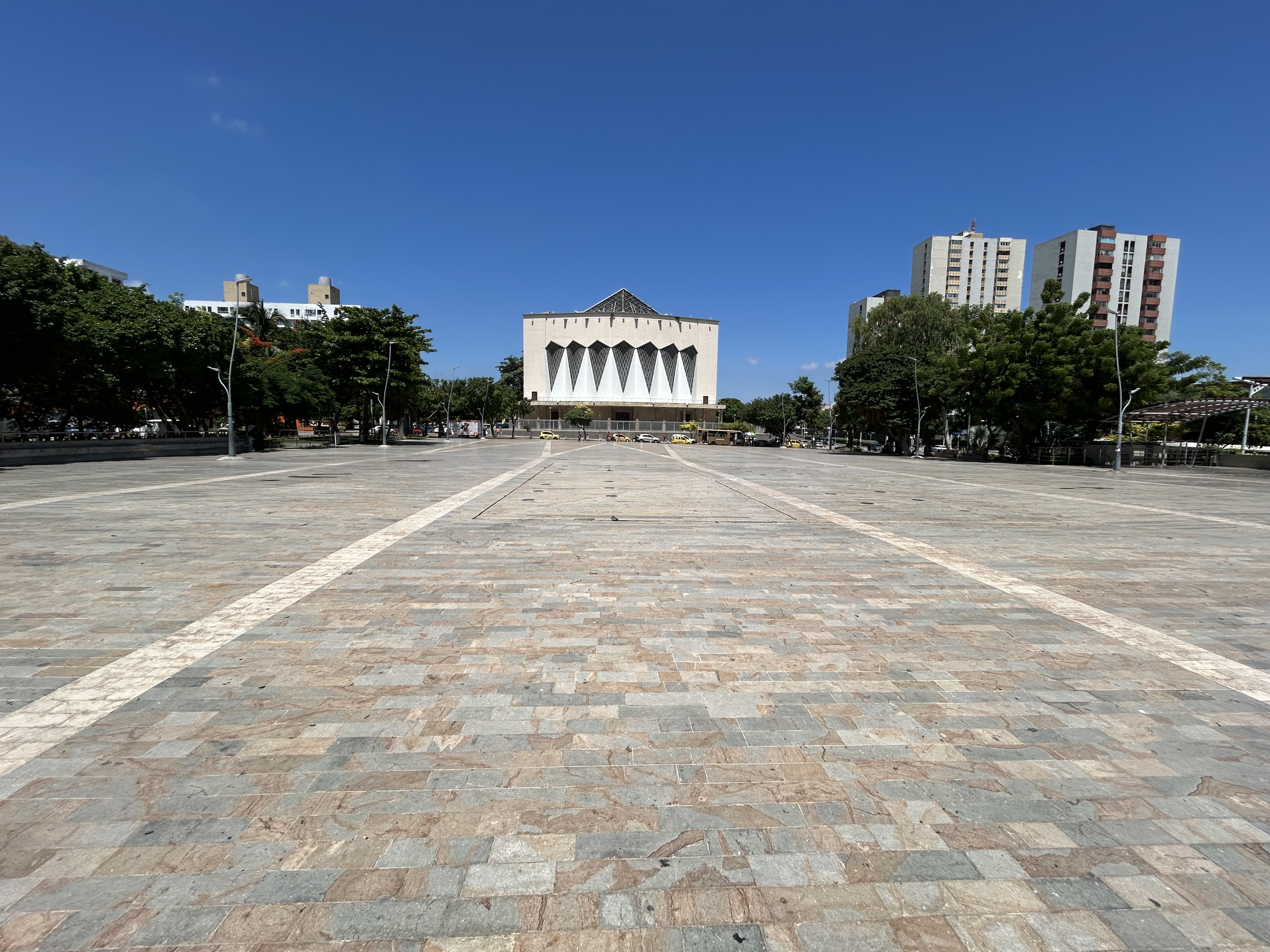
- The square in 2024, with the cathedral in the background
- Interactive map of Peace Square
- Native name: Plaza de la Paz (Spanish)
- Area: 37,000 m^{2} (400,000 sq ft)
- Location: Barranquilla, Colombia
- Coordinates: 10°59′16″N 74°47′20″W
- North: Carrera 46
- East: Calle 47
- South: Carrera 45
- West: Calle 53

Construction
- Inauguration: 7 July 1986

The Peace Square (in Spanish: Plaza de la Paz), officially called Peace Square John Paul II (in Spanish: Plaza de la Paz Juan Pablo II) is an open public space in Barranquilla, Colombia. It is located in the central sector of the city, near the Metropolitan Cathedral. Built in 1986 to accommodate the crowd that welcomed Pope John Paul II in his trip to Colombia, was remodeled between 2011 and 2013. In 2018, its expansion began, which was put into service on December 30, 2019.

Referring to the square in his speech that day, Pope John Paul II said:

In this last stage of my pilgrimage along the roads of Colombia, as a messenger of Christ's peace, I have the joy of finding myself in this Peace Square, whose name unites, today more than ever, the desires of all Colombians.

— John Paul II

With an area of 37,000 m² (after the expansion in 2018-2019), the square is the starting and finishing point for various cultural, political and social events.

Among the monuments and structures in the square, there are: the sculpture "El Policía Amigo" (a sculpture of a policeman holding a dove), a bust of Mahatma Gandhi (donated by the government of India, being a replica of a sculpture created by Ram V. Sutar), the Casa Catinchi (a neoclassical mansion restored as part of the plaza's expansion) and the Cubo de Cristal (an event venue built of glass).
