= Our Lady of the Rosary Cathedral, Girardota =

Coordinates: 6.3767°N 75.4458°W

Our Lady of the Rosary Cathedral
- Catedral de Nuestra Señora del Rosario
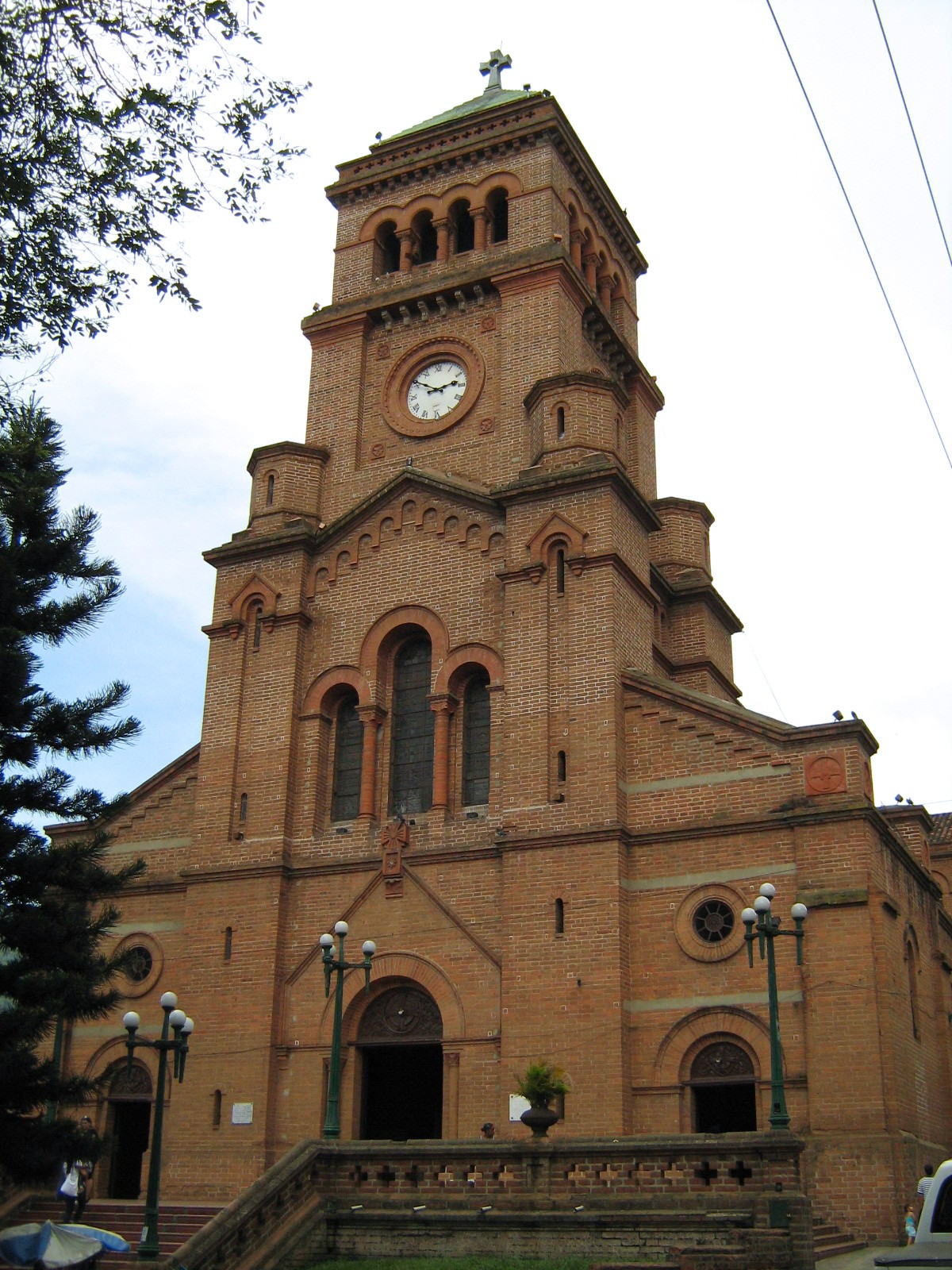
- Our Lady of the Rosary Cathedral
- Location: Girardota
- Country: Colombia
- Denomination: Roman Catholic Church

Administration
- Diocese: Roman Catholic Diocese of Girardota

The Our Lady of the Rosary Cathedral (Spanish: Catedral de Nuestra Señora del Rosario), or Girardota Cathedral is a cathedral of the Catholic church in Colombia. It is a Neo-Romanesque style building, built in solid brick in sight, took 32 years to build and was designed by the French architect Charles Émile Carré (1863–1909), better known as Carlos Carré. The cathedral is located on the eastern side of the main park of the municipality of Girardota, north of the Aburrá Valley, (Antioquia) in the South American country of Colombia.

At first, the building began as a parochial church and in 1988 was elevated to the rank of cathedral, when Pope John Paul II by the Bull "Qui Peculiari" created the Diocese of Girardota establishing this municipality as the head of the new bishopric.

In addition, the cathedral is one of the main pilgrimage sites of the Valley of Aburrá, inside it is the image of the Fallen Lord of Girardota. He is credited with "hundreds of miracles" and pilgrims travel there to keep their promises.

== See also ==
- List of cathedrals in Colombia
- Roman Catholicism in Colombia
- Our Lady of the Rosary
