= Apostolic Vicariate of Casanare =

Former Catholic jurisdiction in Colombia

Apostolic Vicariate of Casanare Apostolicus Vicariatus Casanarensis

Location
- Country: Colombia
- Metropolitan: Immediately subject to the Holy See

Statistics
- Area: 44,200 km^{2} (17,100 sq mi)
- Population: Total; Catholics: 165,330 (1990); 141,142 (1990) (85,4%)

Information
- Denomination: Roman Catholic
- Rite: Latin Rite
- Dissolved: 1999

Leadership
- Bishop: Olavio López Duque, O.A.R.

The Apostolic Vicariate of Casanare (Latin: Apostolicus Vicariatus Casanarensis) was a Roman Catholic apostolic vicariate, located in the central eastern region of Colombia. The Apostolic Vicariate of Casanare was created in 1893 and was suppressed in 1999 when the Roman Catholic Diocese of Yopal was erected.

== Territory ==
The territory of the Apostolic Vicariate of Casanare formed an "immense triangle" with bounds on the northeast by the Meta, on the northwest by Venezuela, and on the west by the Andes.

Nearby dioceses were in Bogota, Tunja, and Pamplona.

== Historical summary ==
- July 17, 1893: Established as Apostolic Vicariate of Casanare from the Diocese of Tunja.
- May 15, 1915: Lost some territory for establishing of Apostolic Prefecture of Arauca.
- October 29, 1999: Suppressed and divided between two newly created ecclesiastical jurisdictions: Vicariate Apostolic of Trinidad (still missionary) and Roman Catholic Diocese of Yopal.
