= Archdiocese of Tunja =

Catholic archdiocese in Colombia

Coordinates: 5.5321°N 73.3613°W

Archdiocese of Tunja Archidioecesis Tunquensis

Catholic

Location
- Country: Colombia

Statistics
- Area: 3,621 km^{2} (1,398 sq mi)
- Population: Total; Catholics: (as of 2004); 300,000; 260,000 (86.7%)

Information
- Rite: Latin Rite
- Established: 29 July 1880 (146 years ago)
- Cathedral: Cathedral Basilica of St. James the Apostle, Tunja

Current leadership
- Pope: Leo XIV
- Archbishop: Gabriel Ángel Villa Vahos

Map

Website
- www.arquidiocesisdetunja.org

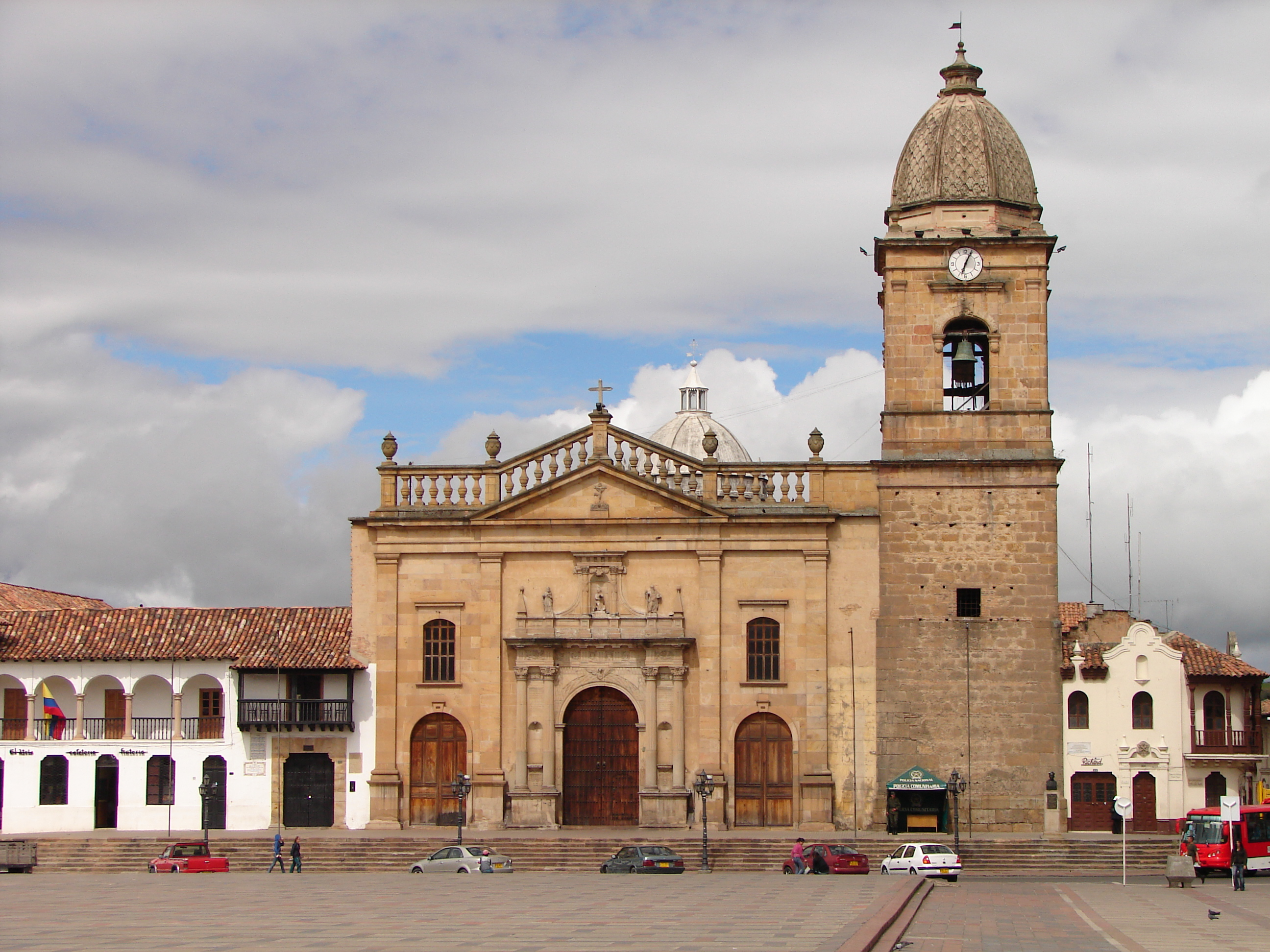
Cathedral Basilica of St. James the Apostle

The Roman Catholic Archdiocese of Tunja (Latin: Tunquensis) is an archdiocese located in the city of Tunja in Colombia.

== History ==
- 29 July 1880: Established as Diocese of Tunja from the Metropolitan Archdiocese of Santafé en Nueva Granada
- 20 June 1964: Promoted as Metropolitan Archdiocese of Tunja

== Special churches ==
- Minor Basilicas:
  - BVM Rosary in Chiquinquirá

== Bishops ==
=== Ordinaries ===
- Bishops of Tunja
  - Severo Garcia † (18 Nov 1881 – 19 Apr 1886) Resigned
  - Giuseppe Benigno Perilla † (17 Mar 1887 – 13 Mar 1903) Died
  - Eduardo Maldonado Calvo † (24 Jun 1905 – 31 Mar 1932) Died
  - Crisanto Luque Sánchez † (9 Sep 1932 – 14 Jul 1950) Appointed, Archbishop of Bogotá (Cardinal in 1953)
  - Ángel María Ocampo Berrio SJ † (6 Dec 1950 – 20 Jun 1964) Appointed, Archbishop of Tunja (see below)
- Archbishops of Tunja
  - Ángel María Ocampo Berrio SJ † (20 Jun 1964 – 20 Feb 1970) Resigned (also listed above)
  - Augusto Trujillo Arango † (20 Feb 1970 – 2 Feb 1998) Resigned
  - Luis Augusto Castro Quiroga, I.M.C. † (2 Feb 1998 – 11 Feb 2020) Retired
  - Gabriel Ángel Villa Vahos (11 Feb 2020 – present)

=== Auxiliary bishops ===
- Juan Nepomuceno Rueda Rueda † (1882-1892), appointed Bishop of Antioquía
- Crisanto Luque y Sánchez † (1931-1932), appointed Bishop here; future Cardinal
- Juan Eliseo Mojica Oliveros † (1967-1970), appointed Bishop of Jericó

=== Other priests of this diocese who became bishops ===
- Norberto Forero y García †, appointed Apostolic Administrator of Nueva Pamplona in 1951
- Carlos Germán Mesa Ruiz, appointed Bishop of Arauca in 2003
- Jaime Muñoz Pedroza, appointed Bishop of Arauca in 2010
- Froilán Tiberio Casas Ortíz, appointed Bishop of Neiva in 2012
- Jaime Cristóbal Abril González, appointed Auxiliary Bishop of Nueva Pamplona in 2016
- Jaime Uriel Sanabria Arias, appointed Vicar Apostolic of San Andrés y Providencia in 2016

== Suffragan dioceses ==
- Chiquinquirá
- Duitama–Sogamoso
- Garagoa
- Yopal

== See also ==
- Roman Catholicism in Colombia
