= Our Lady of Poverty Cathedral, Pereira =

Coordinates: 4°48′53″N 75°41′43″W

Our Lady of Poverty Cathedral
- Catedral de Nuestra Señora de la Pobreza
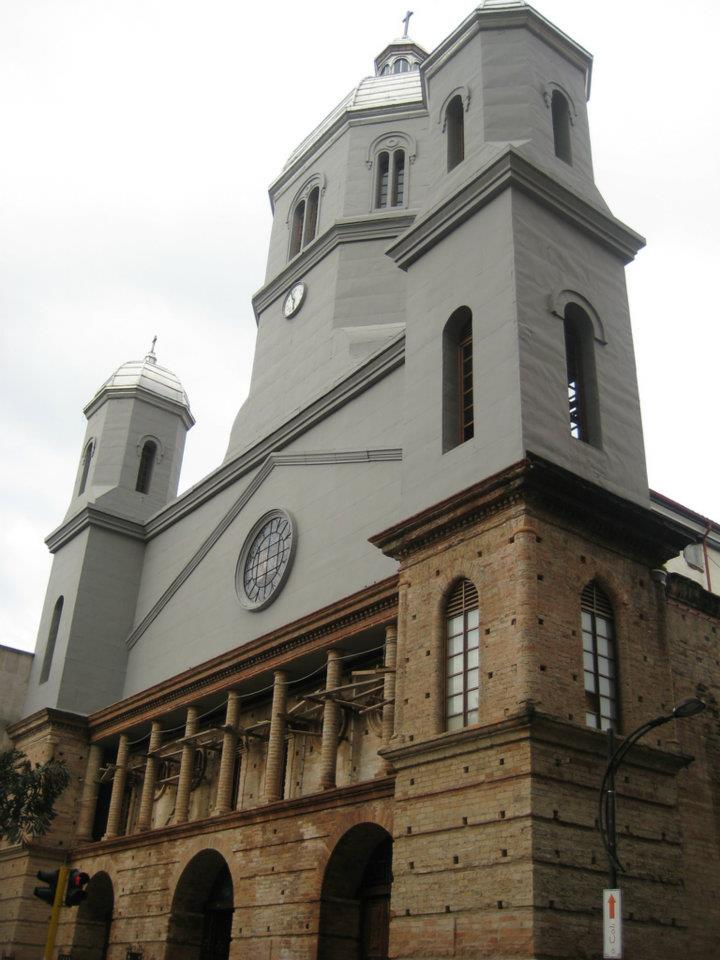
- Our Lady of Poverty Cathedral
- Location: Pereira
- Country: Colombia
- Denomination: Roman Catholic Church

The Our Lady of Poverty Cathedral (Spanish: Catedral de Nuestra Señora de la Pobreza), also called Pereira Cathedral, is the cathedral church of Catholic worship in the city of Pereira, capital of Risaralda department in Colombia. The cathedral is dedicated to the Virgin Mary under the title of Our Lady of Poverty (Nuestra Señora de la Pobreza).

It is the main church of the Diocese of Pereira and was elevated to cathedral on December 18, 1952, by a bull of Pope Pius XII.

It is located on the western side of the Plaza de Bolivar, between Calles 20 and 21 south of Carrera 7, in the center of the city.

== See also ==
- Roman Catholicism in Colombia
- Church of Our Lady (disambiguation)

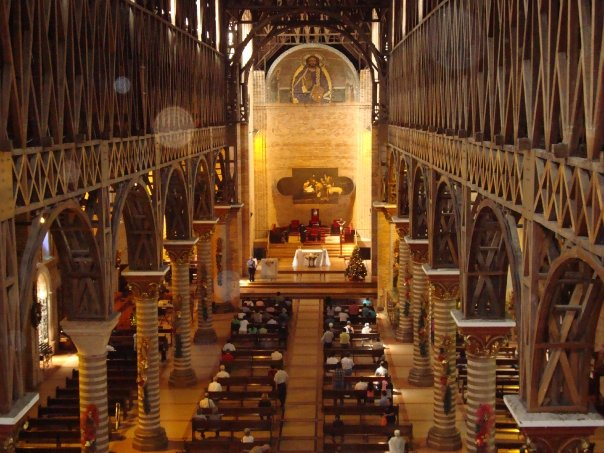
Internal view
