= Queen Mary Cathedral, Barranquilla =

Coordinates: 10.9883°N 74.7904°W

Queen Mary Cathedral
- Catedral Metropolitana María Reina de Barranquilla
- Queen Mary Cathedral
- Location: Barranquilla
- Country: Colombia
- Denomination: Roman Catholic Church

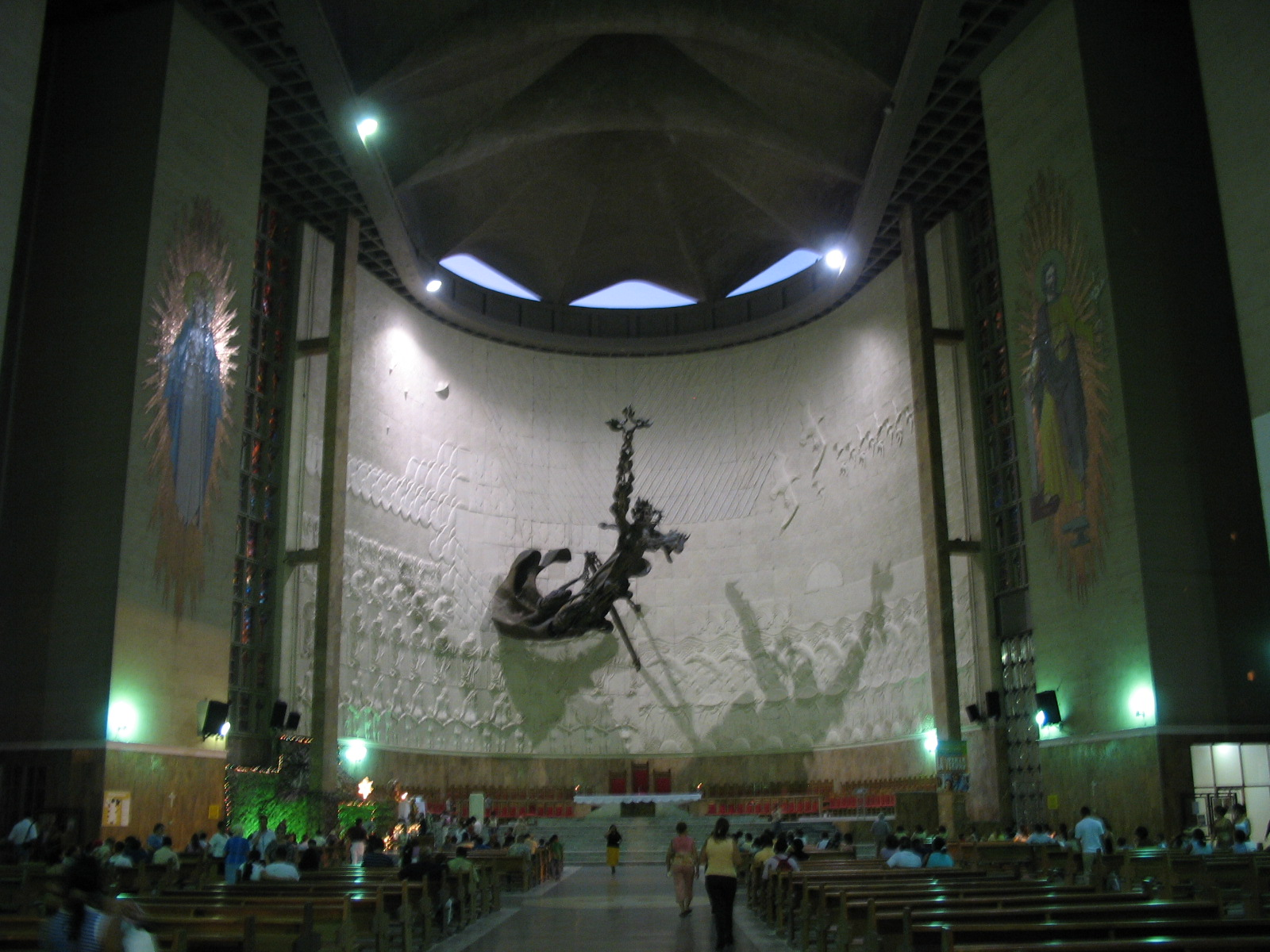
Cathedral, internal view

The Queen Mary Cathedral (Spanish: Catedral Metropolitana María Reina de Barranquilla) also called Metropolitan Cathedral of Queen Mary is a cathedral church of Catholic worship dedicated to the Blessed Virgin Mary. The cathedral is located in the central area of Barranquilla, Colombia, western side of the Plaza de la Paz (Peace's Square), where the zero point of the city is located. The Cathedral is located within the Roman Catholic Archdiocese of Barranquilla, seat of the Archbishop and the parish Cathedral.

== Description ==
It is a building of modernist style whose construction took 27 years and was designed by the Italian architect Angelo Mazzoni Grande (better known as Angelo Mason Grande), redesigned by the Antiochian firm "Vasquez and Cardenas' which carried out construction . The building has 4,274 square meters of built area, 92 m long, 38 m high at the top; 38 meters at the widest part because the cathedral has a bell-shaped plant that tapers in the apse of the presbytery and can accommodate 4,000 people seated.

== See also ==
- Roman Catholicism in Colombia
