= St. Ezequiel Moreno Cathedral, Pasto =

St. Ezequiel Moreno Cathedral
- Catedral de San Ezequiel Moreno Díaz
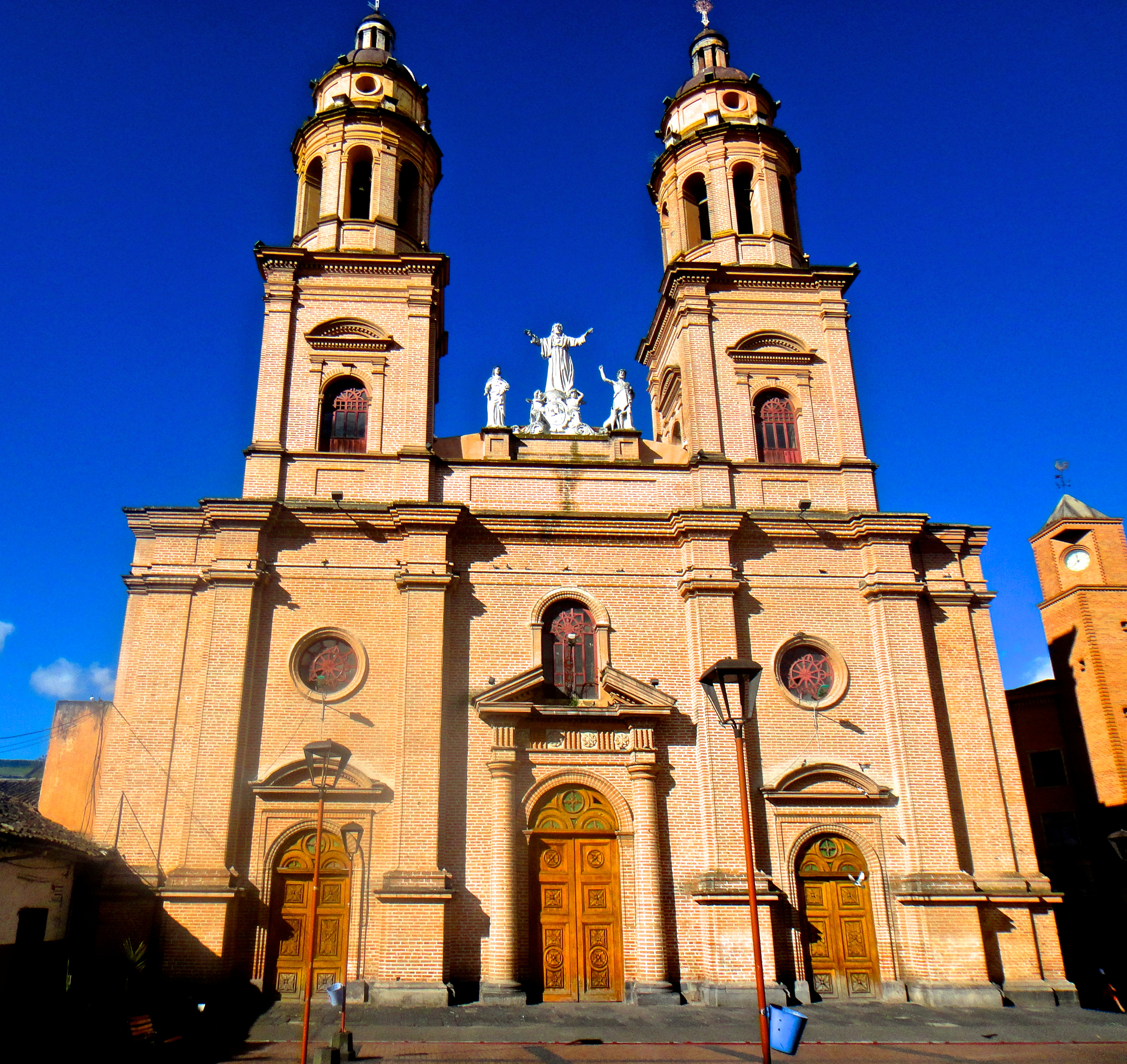
- St. Ezequiel Moreno Cathedral
- 1°12′57″N 77°16′47″W
- Location: Pasto
- Country: Colombia
- Denomination: Roman Catholic Church

The Cathedral of St. Ezequiel Moreno (Spanish: Catedral de San Ezequiel Moreno Díaz) or simply Pasto Cathedral in Pasto, Colombia, is the cathedral church of the Diocese of Pasto. It is consecrated to Saints Ezequiél Moreno y Díaz and Francis of Assisi.

In the early days of settlement, Franciscans erected a chapel dedicated to St. Francis of Assisi. This structure was destroyed when the city, which had been royalist, was sacked by republican forces on December 24, 1822, during the wars of independence. The Franciscans fled from Pasto and never returned, and the chapel deteriorated and was eventually demolished. On the same plot, construction of the new church began October 25, 1899. In January 1920, it was dedicated by Monsignor Antonio Maria Pueyo de Val.

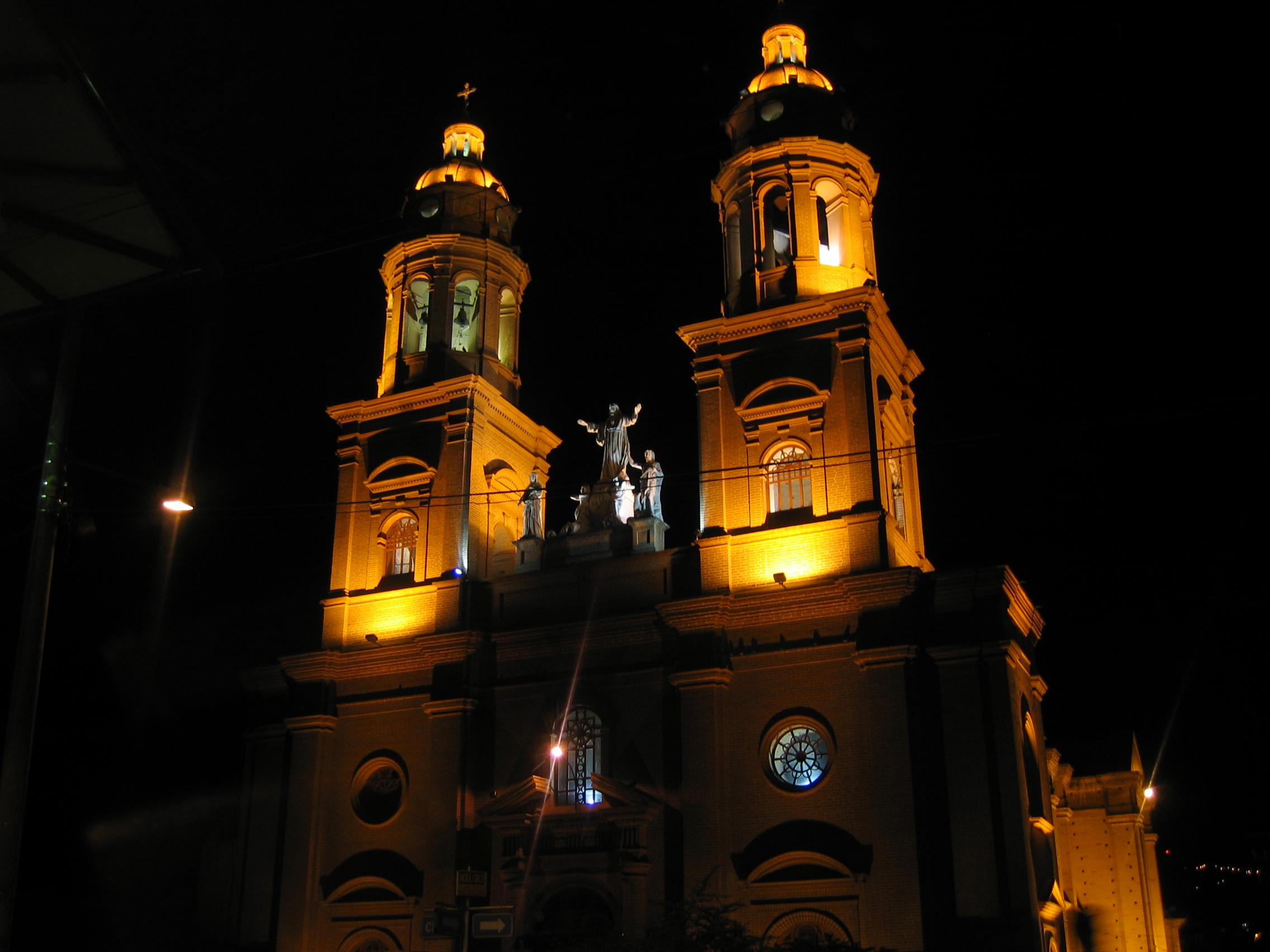

== See also ==
- Catholic Church in Colombia
