= St. Lawrence Cathedral, Duitama =

St. Lawrence Cathedral
- Catedral de San Lorenzo
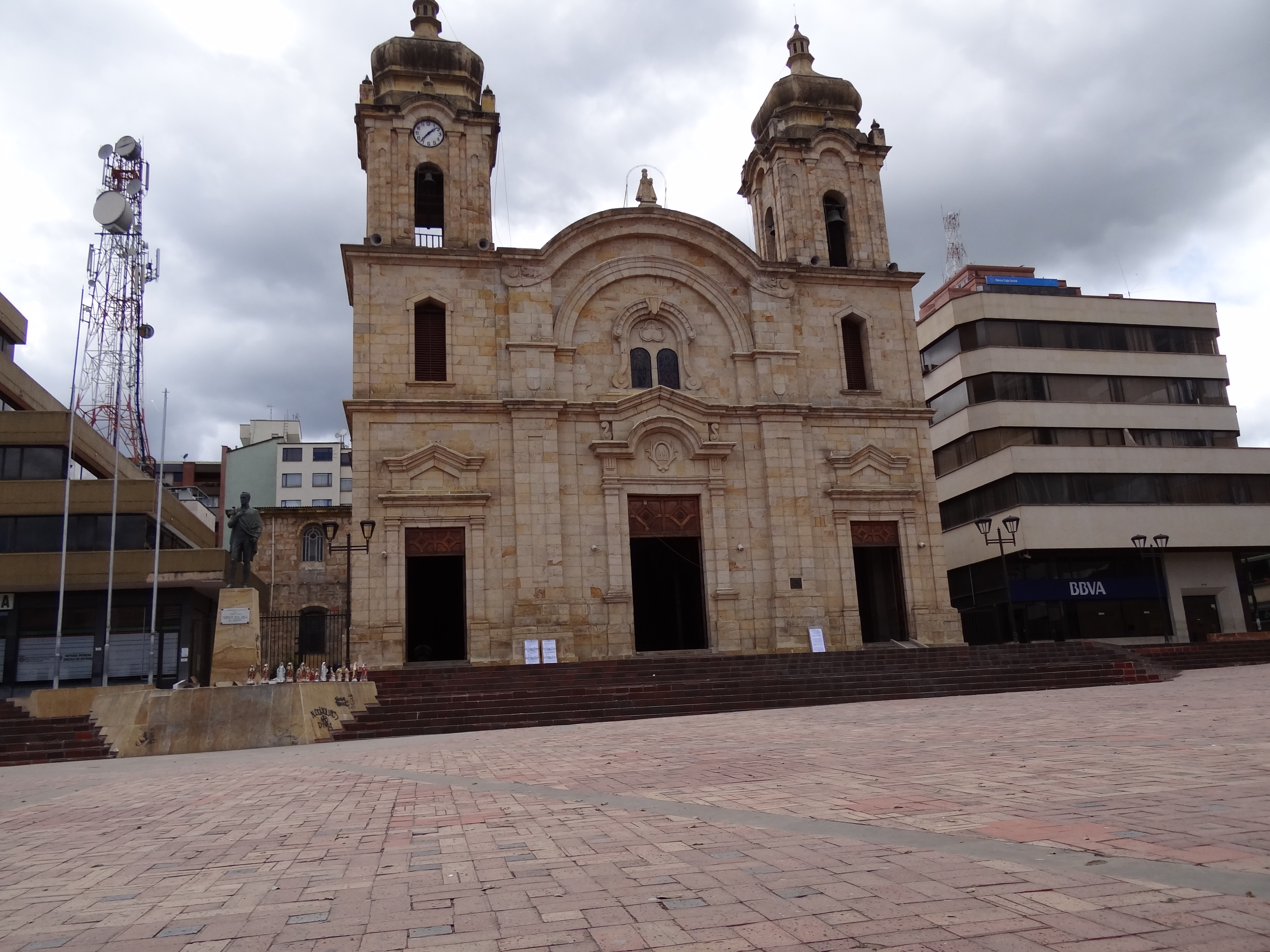
- St. Lawrence Cathedral
- 5.8284°N 73.0342°W
- Location: Duitama
- Country: Colombia
- Denomination: Roman Catholic Church

The St. Lawrence Cathedral (Spanish: Catedral de San Lorenzo) Also Duitama Cathedral Is a religious temple of the Catholic Church under the invocation of St. Lawrence (San Lorenzo), is located in the central zone of the city of Duitama in the South American country of Colombia and belongs to the great group of temples that are in the center of the city; In the case of the cathedral, in front of the Park of the Liberators. The cathedral belongs to the Duitama-Sogamoso Diocese.

The temple in carved limestone is composed of two aisles and a central one. It has a cross shape, has two chapels, one corresponds to the baptistery and the other is dedicated to the adoration of the Blessed Sacrament. There are five altars:

- The St. Lawrence patron of the Cathedral
- The Child God the patron of Duitama
- The High Altar
- the Blessed Sacrament Chapel Altar
- the Solio Altar

== See also ==
- Roman Catholicism in Colombia
- St. Lawrence
