= Diocese of Cartago in Colombia =

Diocese of the Catholic Church

Coordinates: 4.6985°N 75.9264°W

Diocese of Cartago Dioecesis Carthadensis in Colombia

Catholic

Location
- Country: Colombia
- Ecclesiastical province: Cali

Statistics
- Area: 4,000 km^{2} (1,500 sq mi)
- Population: Total; Catholics: (as of 2004); 523,000; 515,000 (98.5%)

Information
- Rite: Latin Rite
- Established: 16 March 1962 (64 years ago)
- Cathedral: Our Lady of Mount Carmel Cathedral, Valle del Cauca

Current leadership
- Pope: Leo XIV
- Bishop: César Alcides Balbín Tamayo
- Metropolitan Archbishop: Darío de Jesús Monsalve Mejía
- Bishops emeritus: José Alejandro Castaño Arbeláez, O.A.R.

Map

Website
- www.diocesisdecartago.org

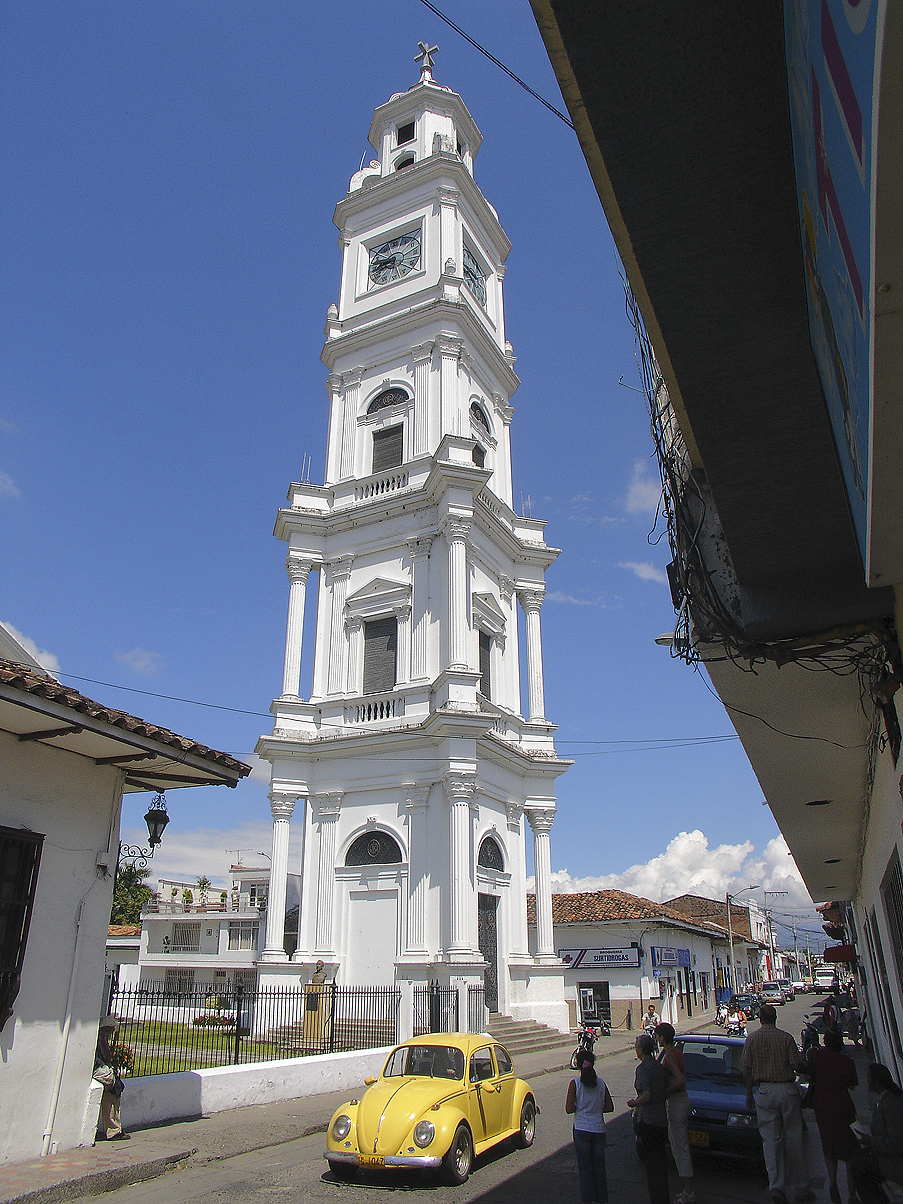
Cathedral of Our Lady of Mount Carmel

The Roman Catholic Diocese of Cartago (Latin: Carthaden(sis) in Colombia) is a diocese located in the city of Cartago in the ecclesiastical province of Cali in Colombia.

== History ==
- 16 March 1962: Established as Diocese of Cartago from the Diocese of Cali

== Bishops ==
- José Gabriel Calderón Contreras (26 April 1962 – 19 April 1995)
- Luis Madrid Merlano (19 April 1995 – 30 March 2010) appointed Archbishop of Nueva Pamplona
- José Alejandro Castaño Arbeláez, O.A.R. (21 October 2010 – 31 October 2020)
- César Alcides Balbín Tamayo (19 October 2021 – present)

Other priests of this diocese who became bishops

- Edgar de Jesús Garcia Gil, appointed Auxiliary Bishop of Cali in 1992
- Edgar Aristizábal Quintero, appointed Auxiliary Bishop of Medellín in 2011
- Juan Carlos Cárdenas Toro, appointed Auxiliary Bishop of Cali in 2015

== See also ==
- Roman Catholicism in Colombia
