= Julio Franco Arango =

Colombian Roman Catholic bishop

Julio Franco Arango (3 March 1914 – 16 September 1980) was a Colombian Roman Catholic bishop.

Ordained to the priesthood in 1938, Arango was named bishop in June 1964. In August 1964, he was appointed bishop of the Roman Catholic Diocese of Duitama–Sogamoso, Colombia, and died in 1980 while still in office.
