= Archdiocese of Villavicencio =

Catholic archdiocese in Colombia

Coordinates: 4.1522°N 73.6387°W

Archdiocese of Villavicencio Archidioecesis Villavicentiensis

Catholic

Location
- Country: Colombia
- Ecclesiastical province: Villavicencio

Statistics
- Area: 65,470 km^{2} (25,280 sq mi)
- Population: Total; Catholics: (as of 2004); 540,000; 506,000 (93.7%)

Information
- Rite: Latin Rite
- Established: 23 June 1903 (123 years ago)
- Cathedral: Our Lady of Mount Carmel Cathedral

Current leadership
- Pope: Leo XIV
- Archbishop: Misael Vacca Ramirez
- Bishops emeritus: Alfonso Cabezas Aristizábal, C.M. Oscar Urbina Ortega

Map

Website
- http://arquidiocesisdevillavicencio.org.co/

The Roman Catholic Archdiocese of Villavicencio (Latin: Villavicentiensis) is an archdiocese located in the city of Villavicencio in Colombia.

== History ==
June 23, 1903
Established as Territorial Prelature of Intendencias Orientales from the Metropolitan Archdiocese of Bogotá
March 16, 1908
Demoted as Apostolic Vicariate of Los Llanos de San Martín
June 9, 1949
Renamed as Apostolic Vicariate of Villavicencio
February 11, 1964
Promoted as Diocese of Villavicencio
July 3, 2004
Promoted as Metropolitan Archdiocese of Villavicencio
April 3, 2020
15 priests serving in the Archdiocese of Villavicencio are suspended from public ministry due to sex abuse allegations.
April 27, 2020
Accused of sexual abuse, priest Oscar Mora, one of now 19 suspended priests from the Archdiocese of Villavicencio, is revealed to have been transferred to the Roman Catholic Diocese of Dallas in the United States of America. He is soon removed from ministry after the Archdiocese of Villavicencio notifies the Diocese of Dallas about Mora's sex abuse allegations.

== Bishops ==
=== Ordinaries, in reverse chronological order ===
- Archbishops of Villavicencio (Roman rite), below
  - Archbishop Misael Vacca Ramirez (2022.12.31 - )
  - Archbishop Oscar Urbina Ortega (2007.11.30 – 2022.04.23)
  - Archbishop José Octavio Ruiz Arenas (2004.07.03 – 2007.05.31), appointed Vice President of the Pontifical Commission for Latin America
- Bishops of Villavicencio (Roman rite), below
  - Archbishop José Octavio Ruiz Arenas (2002.07.16 – 2004.07.03)
  - Bishop Alfonso Cabezas Aristizábal, C.M. (1994.05.03 – 2001.06.16)
  - Bishop Gregorio Garavito Jiménez, S.M.M. (1969.04.26 – 1994.05.03)
  - Bishop Frans Joseph Bruls Canisius, S.M.M. (1964.02.11 – 1969.04.26)
- Vicar Apostolic of Villavicencio (Roman rite), below
  - Bishop Frans Joseph Bruls Canisius, S.M.M. (1949.06.09 – 1964.02.11)
- Vicars Apostolic of Los Llanos de San Martín (Roman rite), below
  - Bishop Frans Joseph Bruls Canisius, S.M.M. (1939.06.27 – 1949.06.09)
  - Bishop Joseph-Marie-Désiré Guiot, S.M.M. (1908.04.04 – 1939.06.24)

=== Coadjutor bishops ===
- Francisco José Bruls Canisius, S.M.M. (1939), as Coadjutor Vicar Apostolic
- Alfonso Cabezas Aristizábal, C.M. (1992-1994)

=== Auxiliary bishop ===
- Gregorio Garavito Jiménez, S.M.M. (1961-1969), appointed Bishop here

== Suffragan dioceses ==
- Granada
- San José del Guaviare

== See also ==
- Roman Catholicism in Colombia
