= Apostolic Vicariate of Trinidad =

Catholic missionary jurisdiction in Colombia

Apostolic Vicariate of Trinidad Apostolicus Vicariatus Trinitensis

Location
- Country: Colombia

Statistics
- Area: 27,075 km^{2} (10,454 sq mi)
- Population: Total; Catholics: (as of 2010); 42,294; 37,757 (89.3%)
- Parishes: 5

Information
- Denomination: Catholic Church
- Rite: Roman Rite
- Established: 29 October 1999 (26 years ago)
- Cathedral: Catedral de la Inmaculata Concepción

Current leadership
- Pope: Leo XIV
- Vicar Apostolic: Héctor Javier Pizarro Acevedo, O.A.R.

Map

The Apostolic Vicariate of Trinidad (Latin: Apostolicus Vicariatus Trinitensis) in the Catholic Church is located in the town of Trinidad, Casanare in Colombia.

== History ==
On 29 October 1999 Blessed John Paul II established the Apostolic Vicariate of Trinidad from the suppressed Apostolic Vicariate of Casanare.

== Ordinaries ==
- Héctor Javier Pizarro Acevedo, O.A.R. (23 Oct 2000 – present)

== See also ==
- Roman Catholicism in Colombia
