= Cathedral Basilica of St. James the Apostle, Tunja =

Coordinates: 5.5336°N 73.3613°W

Cathedral Basilica of St. James the Apostle
- Catedral Basílica de Santiago Apóstol
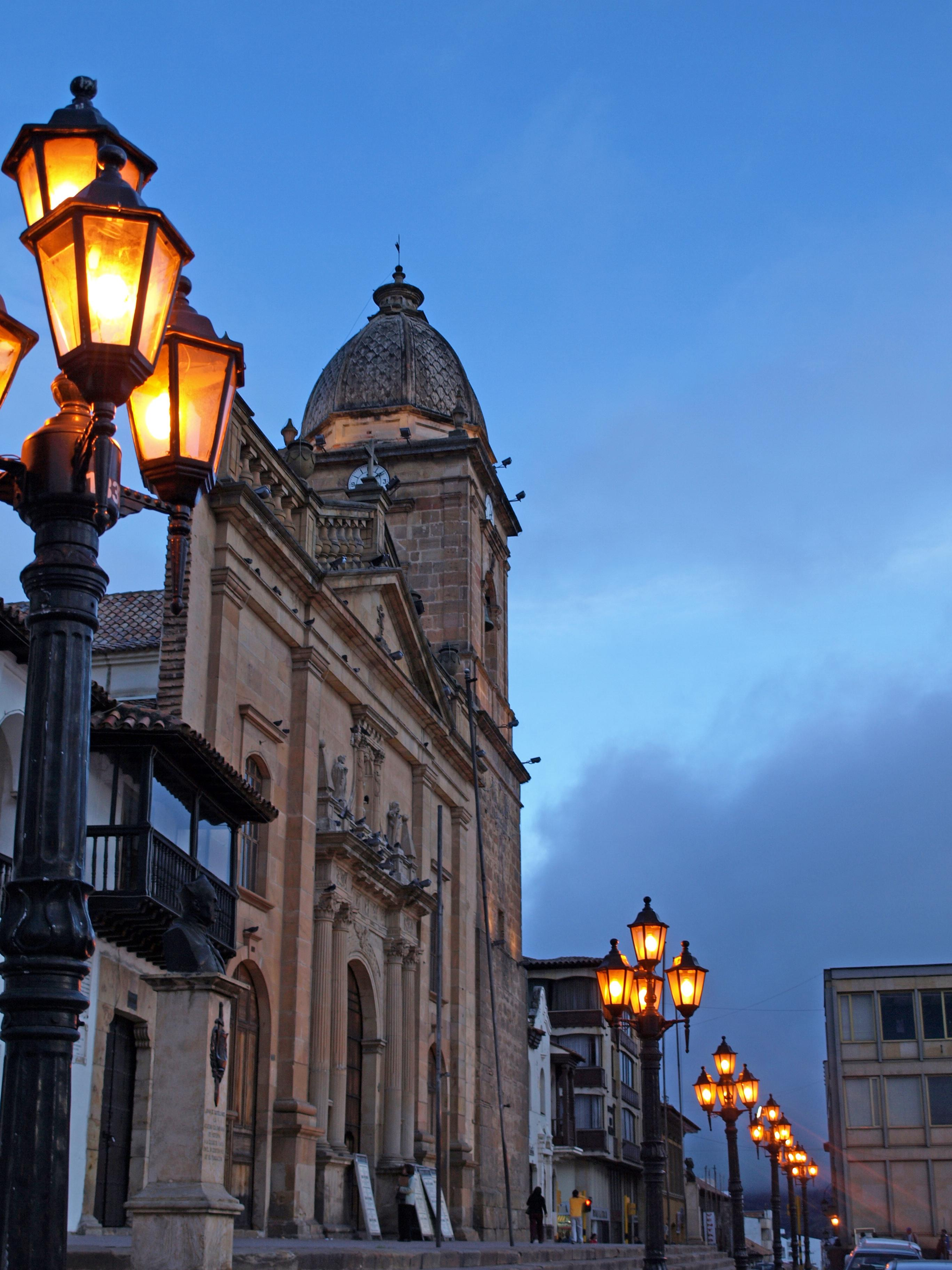
- Cathedral Basilica of St. James the Apostle
- Location: Tunja
- Country: Colombia
- Denomination: Roman Catholic Church

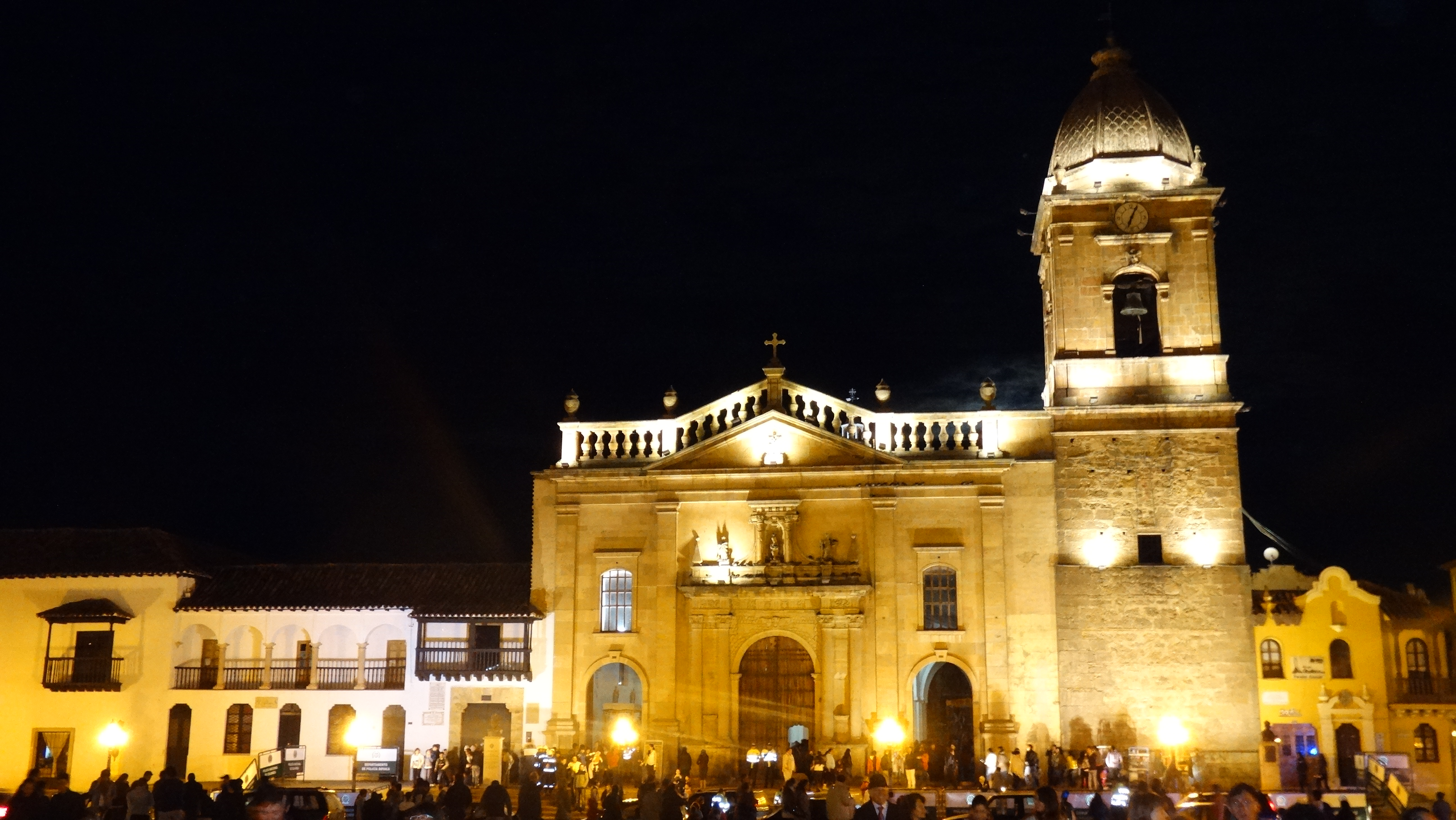
Exterior view

The Cathedral Basilica of St. James the Apostle (Spanish: Catedral Basílica de Santiago Apóstol) also called Tunja Cathedral It is the oldest Roman Catholic cathedral of Colombia, which is enshrined under the patronage of St. James the Greater (Santiago Apóstol). The building is located on the eastern side of the Plaza de Bolívar in Tunja, in the historic center of the city of Tunja (capital of the department of Boyacá) in the South American country of Colombia.

== History ==
The cathedral is the main church of the Archdiocese of Tunja and archbishopric, since his elevation to diocese by the Bull of pope Leo XIII called Infinitus amor and published on July 29, 1880.

Its construction was hired by Juan de Castellanos and Gonzálo Suárez Rendon to Pedro Gutiérrez, who began work in 1567. His style can be within the Isabeline style, although some later renovations have added Neoclassical building elements; It has a single tower and its interior consists of three naves with side chapels. The exterior of Renaissance style was designed by Bartolomé Carrión in 1598.

The historical Tunja sector (including the cathedral) was declared a National Monument (Monumento Nacional) of Colombia by Law 163 of December 30, 1959.

== See also ==
- Roman Catholicism in Colombia
- Cathedral Basilica of St. James the Apostle
