= 2026 =

Current calendar year

2026 in various calendars
- Gregorian calendar: 2026; MMXXVI
- Ab urbe condita: 2779
- Armenian calendar: 1475; ԹՎ ՌՆՀԵ
- Assyrian calendar: 6776
- Baháʼí calendar: 182–183
- Balinese saka calendar: 1947–1948
- Bengali calendar: 1432–1433
- Berber calendar: 2976
- British Regnal year: 4 Cha. 3 – 5 Cha. 3
- Buddhist calendar: 2570
- Burmese calendar: 1388
- Byzantine calendar: 7534–7535
- Chinese calendar: 乙巳年 (Wood Snake); 4723 or 4516 — to — 丙午年 (Fire Horse); 4724 or 4517
- Coptic calendar: 1742–1743
- Discordian calendar: 3192
- Ethiopian calendar: 2018–2019
- Hebrew calendar: 5786–5787
- Hindu calendars
- Vikram Samvat: 2082–2083
- Shaka Samvat: 1947–1948
- Kali Yuga: 5126–5127
- Holocene calendar: 12026
- Igbo calendar: 1026–1027
- Iranian calendar: 1404–1405
- Islamic calendar: 1447–1448
- Japanese calendar: Reiwa 8 (令和８年)
- Javanese calendar: 1959–1960
- Juche calendar: 115
- Julian calendar: Gregorian minus 13 days
- Korean calendar: 4359
- Minguo calendar: ROC 115 民國115年
- Nanakshahi calendar: 558
- Thai solar calendar: 2569
- Tibetan calendar: ཤིང་མོ་སྦྲུལ་ལོ་ (female Wood-Snake); 2152 or 1771 or 999 — to — མེ་ཕོ་རྟ་ལོ་ (male Fire-Horse); 2153 or 1772 or 1000
- Unix time: 1767225600 – 1798761599

2026 (MMXXVI) is the current year, and is a common year starting on Thursday of the Gregorian calendar, the 2026th year of the Common Era (CE) and Anno Domini (AD) designations, the 26th year of the 3rd millennium and the 21st century, and the 7th year of the 2020s decade.

The early part of the year saw escalating armed conflicts in the Americas and Middle East. In January, the United States launched a military operation in Venezuela that captured sitting its president Nicolás Maduro, leading to a blockade of Venezuelan oil exports that contributed to a crisis in Cuba. In Syria, an offensive by the Syrian government led to the Syrian Democratic Forces eventually being integrated into the Syrian Army, ending the Rojava Revolution, while in Yemen, a counteroffensive by the Yemeni government led to the collapse of the Southern Transitional Council, followed by Houthi offensives, including attacks on airports in Saudi Arabia. In February, Pakistan launched airstrikes against Afghanistan, leading to an open war between both nations. In Iran, in response to authorities cracking down on protests, the United States and Israel began a war in late February with the assassination of Supreme Leader Ali Khamenei, which resulted in widespread economic grief, fuel shortages and retaliatory strikes on Gulf nations, as well as the closure of the Strait of Hormuz and a naval blockade. There were also escalations of the Ethiopian civil conflict.

The continued release of the Epstein files that began the previous year has influenced scrutiny, media coverage, and in some cases arrests of high-profile individuals in politics, business, and academia in the Western world.

Businessman Elon Musk became the first person to have a verified net worth exceeding US$1 trillion upon the initial public offering of his company SpaceX in June, though he frequently lost and regained that status due to changes in SpaceX's market valuation.

In politics, a conservative wave spread through Latin America, with right-wing victories in Colombia, Costa Rica and Peru, with the exception of Brazil. Right-wing parties in Europe continued to gain ground in the United Kingdom and across the European Union, with the exceptions of Hungary, Serbia and Portugal. In the 2026 United States elections, the Democratic Party made major gains.

In science and technology, the dominant headline has been NASA's Artemis II flyby of the Moon, the first crewed flight beyond low Earth orbit since Apollo 17 in 1972, sending the first woman, black man, and non-American beyond low Earth orbit. Artificial intelligence has continued to advance, with increasing focus on scaling models, infrastructure, and commercial applications. These developments have also brought growing scrutiny of the potential risks posed by increasingly capable AI systems, including concerns over alignment, misuse, loss of human control, and their wider societal and economic effects. Notably, autonomous cyberattacks conducted by OpenAI's AI agents during cybersecurity tests in mid-2026 led to major AI companies prioritizing the safety and alignment of their models. A series of high-profile technological failures, including the European cold chain and Binance hacks, PHP2Shell, and the November 2026 outages (including Microsoft, the FAA, JPMorgan Chase, the NSA, and Apple) occurred late in the year, disrupting critical services.

In sports, the 2026 Winter Olympics were the first Olympic Games to be officially co-hosted by two cities (Milan and Cortina d'Ampezzo, Italy). The 2026 FIFA World Cup became the first edition to be hosted by three nations (United States, Mexico and Canada) and the first to include 48 teams, in addition to setting the record for the highest attendance in World Cup history; a short time later, a crisis in FIFA erupted following a proposal of creation of a commercial subsidiary, largely rejected by confederations.

In seismology, earthquakes in the Philippines, Venezuela, Colombia and Indonesia caused high death tolls and widespread destruction.

In nautics, several incidents, such as a hantavirus outbreak on the cruise ship MV Hondius, the capsizing of the ferry Mbuya Nehanda on Lake Kariba, a fire on the vessel MV June Aster and the sinking of the ship Virgo Transport 8, resulted in large numbers of casualties.

In mining, two collapses at the Rubaya mines in the Democratic Republic of the Congo, an explosion at a coal mine in China and a landslide at a gold mine in Angola became some of the worst disasters of their types in recent years of these countries.

In health, an epidemic of Ebola in the Democratic Republic of the Congo and Uganda has been declared a Public Health Emergency of International Concern by the World Health Organization.

== Events ==
=== January ===
La Constellation bar in Crans-Montana, Switzerland, where a fire kills 41 people and injures 116 others on January 1

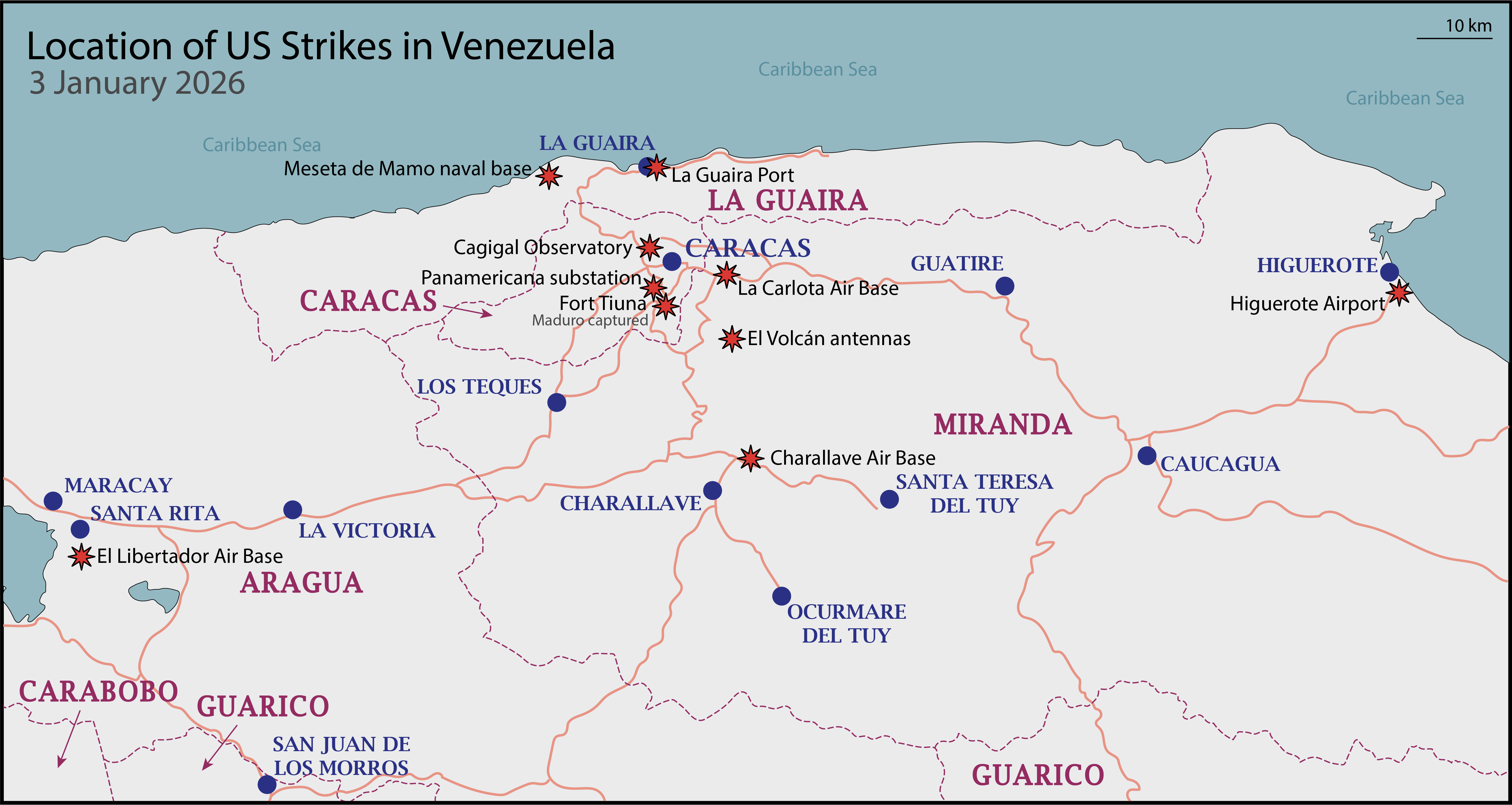
Map of the US airstrikes on Venezuela, which resulted in the capture of the Venezuelan president Nicolás Maduro and first lady Cilia Flores on January 3

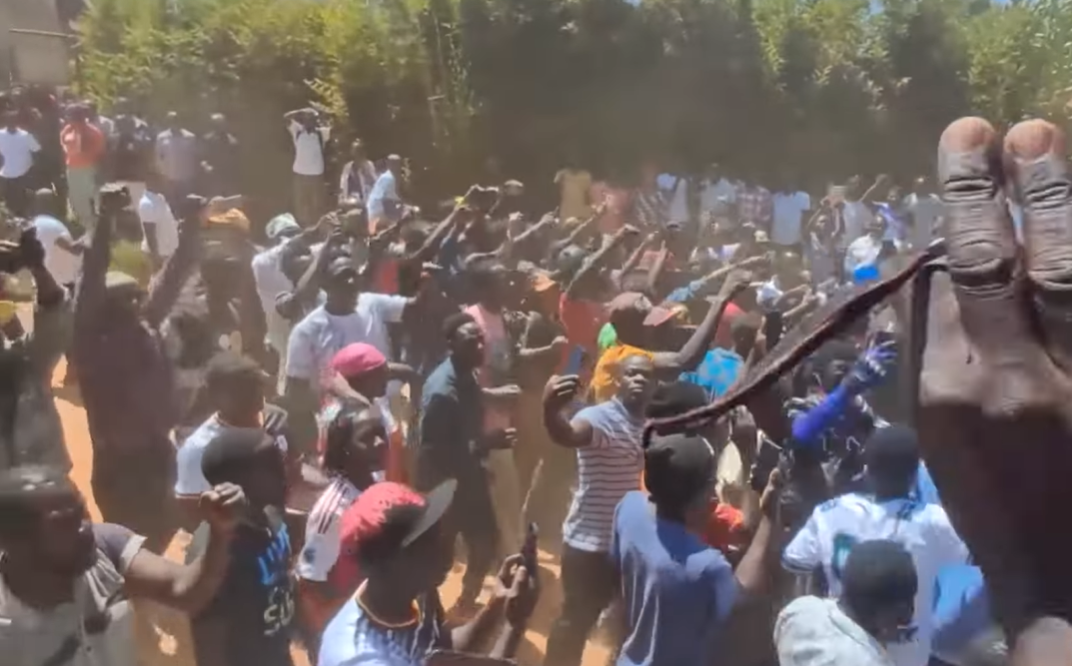
Protests take place in Uganda on January 16 due to allegations of fraud over the general election, won by incumbent President Yoweri Museveni

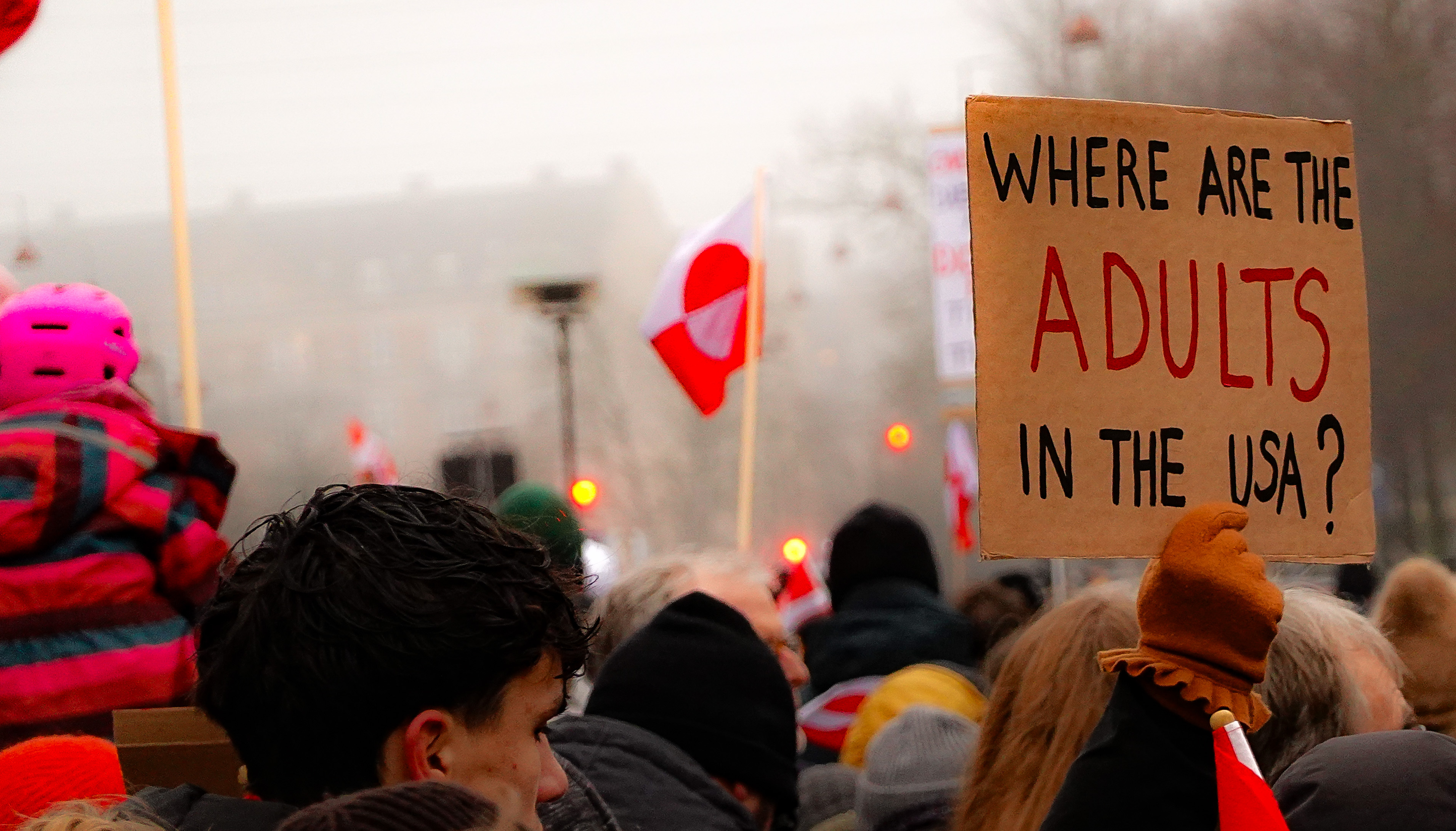
Hands off Greenland protests in Copenhagen on January 17 following threats of annexation of the island by US president Donald Trump

Prime Minister of Spain Pedro Sánchez and government officials inspecting the Adamuz rail disaster site that occurred on January 18

Damage by Storm Harry in Marsaskala, Malta on January 25

- January 1
  - Bulgaria adopts the euro, becoming the 21st member state of the eurozone.
  - Cyprus begins its role as President of the Council of the European Union.
  - 41 people are killed and 116 injured in a fire at a bar in Crans-Montana, Switzerland.
- January 2 – Equatorial Guinea moves its capital from Malabo to Ciudad de la Paz.
- January 3 – The United States launches several airstrikes on multiple locations across northern Venezuela, capturing Venezuelan president Nicolás Maduro and first lady Cilia Flores.
- January 5 – Delcy Rodríguez is formally sworn in as the acting president of Venezuela after the capture of Nicolás Maduro.
- January 6
  - The 2025 Jubilee ends.
  - Fighting between Syrian government forces and the Kurdish armed group Syrian Democratic Forces begins.
- January 7 – The United States seizes two shadow fleet tankers, including one under a Russian flag, in the United States oil blockade during Operation Southern Spear.
- January 8 – Thongloun Sisoulith is re-elected as the General Secretary of the Lao People's Revolutionary Party at the 12th Central Committee's first meeting.
- January 8–9 – Iran retaliates against nationwide protests, with tens of thousands reportedly killed on the 8th and 9th alone, and many thousands more detained amid a severe government crackdown.
- January 9 – 2025–2026 Southern Yemen campaign: The Southern Transitional Council announces its dissolution following territorial losses, including its capital Aden.
- January 11 – The 2026 Beninese parliamentary election is held.
- January 14 – Operation Arctic Endurance is launched by Denmark, with multiple European countries sending troops to Greenland in response to US President Donald Trump's threats of invasion or annexation of the island.
- January 15 – 2026 Ugandan general election: Incumbent President Yoweri Museveni wins reelection amidst protests over allegations of election fraud, leading to deaths of dozens of protestors and the abduction of main opposition candidate Bobi Wine.
- January 17 – A fire at a shopping mall in Karachi, Pakistan, kills 80 people.
- January 18 – 46 people are killed and 292 are injured after two trains derail in Adamuz in southern Spain.
- January 19
  - The 56th World Economic Forum begins in Davos, Switzerland.
  - Islamic State insurgency in Afghanistan: Seven people are killed and twenty others injured in a bombing at a Chinese restaurant in Shahr-e Naw, Kabul, Afghanistan. The Islamic State – Khorasan Province claims responsibility.
- January 20 – The Syrian transitional government captures most of the territory held by the Syrian Democratic Forces following an offensive and subsequent ceasefire.
- January 22
  - The United States officially leaves the World Health Organization.
  - France seizes one shadow fleet tanker, under a Russian flag, in the Mediterranean.
- January 23
  - Tô Lâm is re-elected as the General Secretary of the Communist Party of Vietnam at the 14th National Congress.
  - Iliana Iotova becomes the first female President of Bulgaria after the resignation of Rumen Radev.
  - The 56th World Economic Forum in Davos, Switzerland ends.
  - 50 people are killed when a boat capsizes in Malta during Storm Harry. The Italian coastguard estimates a further 380 migrants who set off from Tunisia also drowned during the storm.
- January 24 – At least 70 people are killed and 10 others missing after major landslides in West Java, Indonesia.
- January 25 – 2025–26 Myanmar general election: In an election described by the United Nations as a "sham", the pro-military Union Solidarity and Development Party wins a supermajority of seats in the Pyithu Hluttaw and the Amyotha Hluttaw.
- January 26 – The body of Ran Gvili, the last remaining Israeli hostage in the Gaza Strip, is recovered by the IDF from northern Gaza, thus ending the Gaza war hostage crisis.
- January 27 – The India–European Union Free Trade Agreement is signed after nearly two decades of negotiations, eliminating Tariffs on a broad range of products and services between the two regions.
- January 28
  - Sarah Mullally becomes the first female primate of the Church of England and Archbishop of Canterbury.
  - Successive mine collapses at the Rubaya coltan mine in eastern Democratic Republic of the Congo kill more than 600 people.
  - Storm Kristin causes a catastrophic impact in Portugal and Spain with €6 billion in damage in the central region of Portugal, 15 deaths and 2,000 injuries.
- January 29
  - Ethiopian civil conflict: Clashes erupt in the Tigray region in Ethiopia between Tigrayan fighters and Federal Forces.
  - Insurgency in Balochistan: Fighting between the Balochistan Liberation Army and the Pakistani armed forces in several districts of Balochistan, Pakistan, leaves at least 225 people dead.
- January 30 – Three million pages related to the Epstein files are released to the public, mentioning many high-profile public figures worldwide.

=== February ===
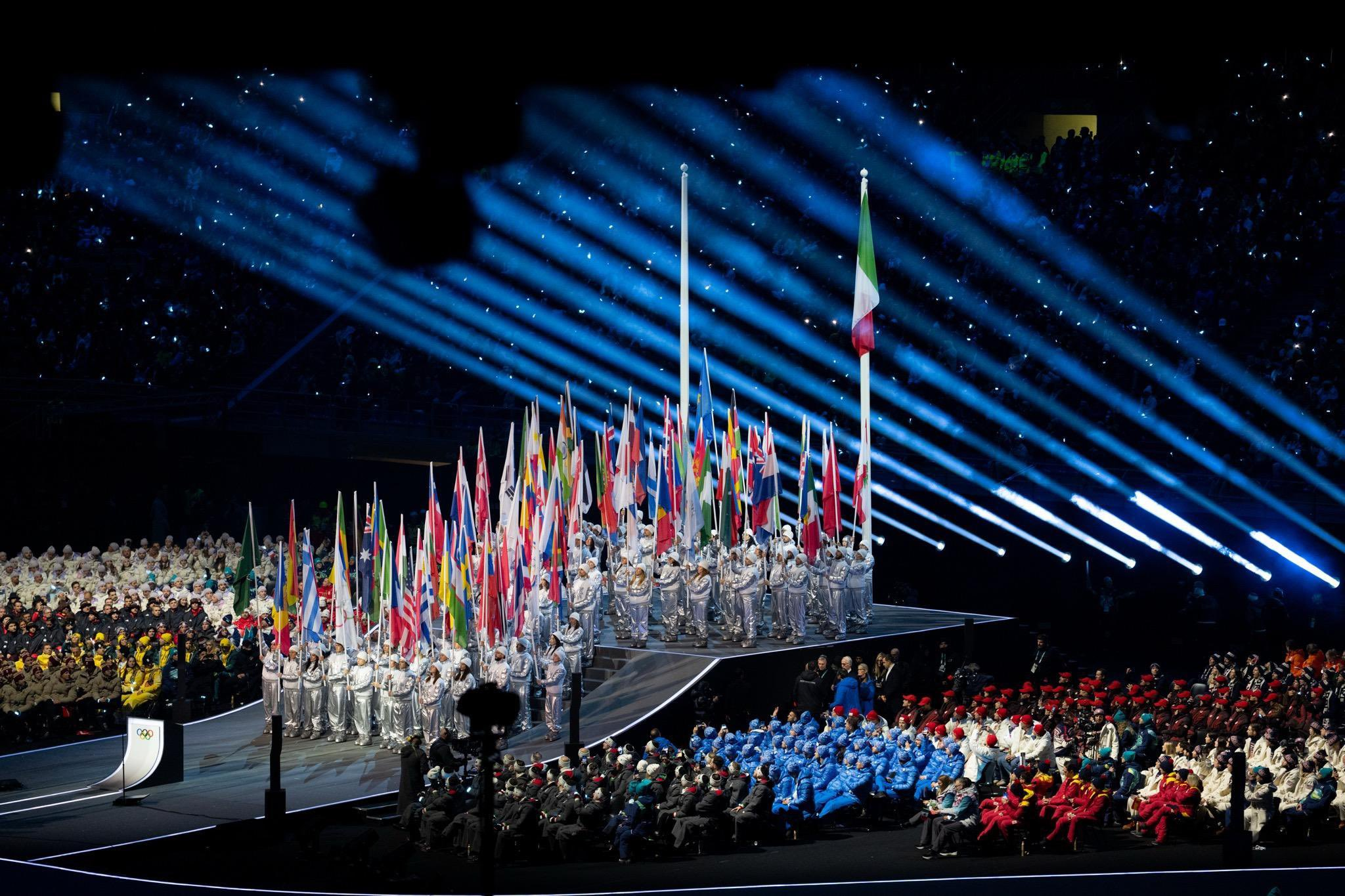
Flag bearers at the opening ceremony of the Winter Olympics held in Milan and Cortina d'Ampezzo, Italy, on February 6

An alleged cartel gunman lighting a fire at a gas station following the Jalisco operation on February 22

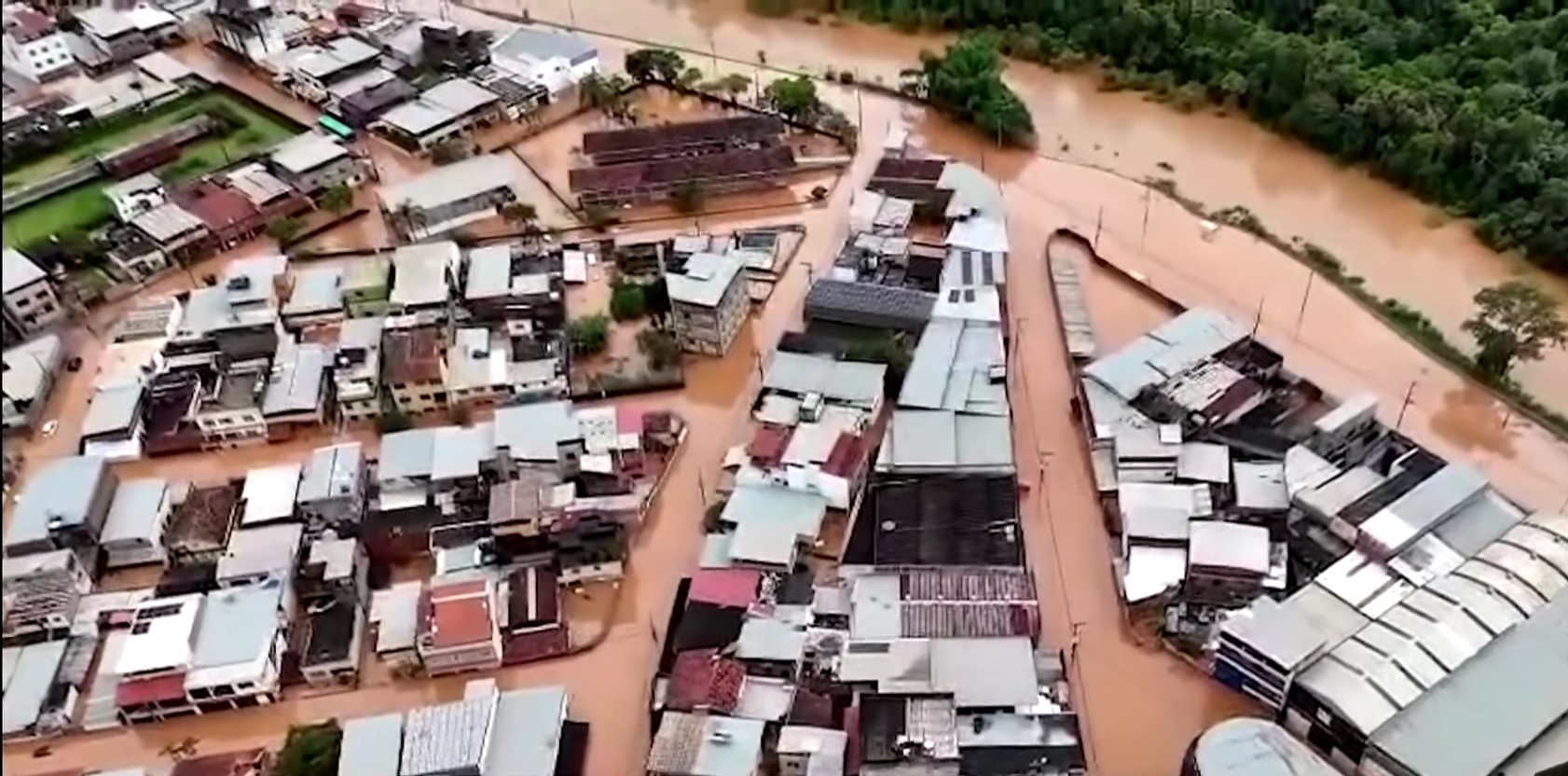
Flooding on the banks of the Paraibuna River in Juiz de Fora, Minas Gerais, Brazil, on February 26

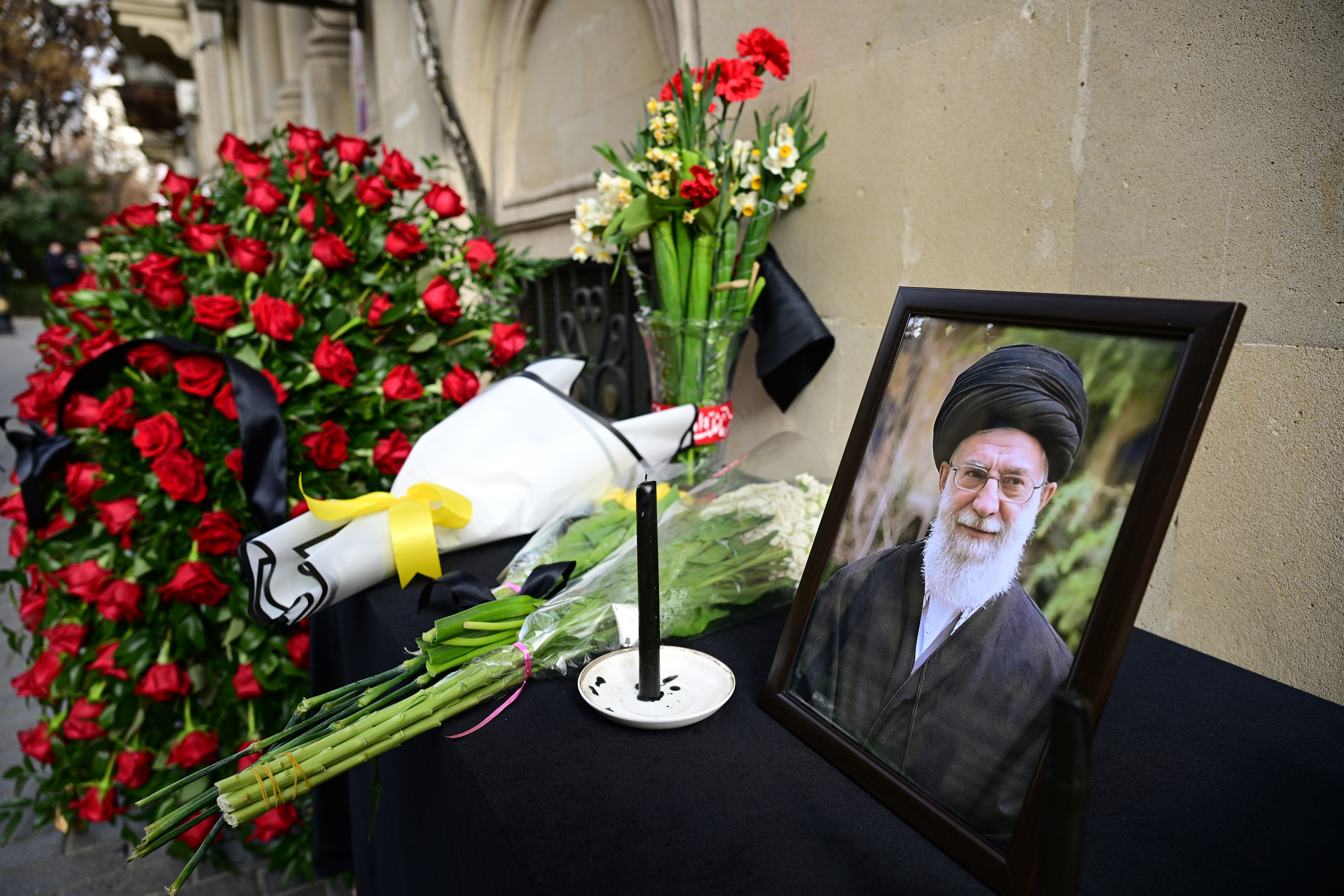
Tribute to the Iranian Supreme Leader, Ali Khamenei in the Iranian Embassy in Baku, Azerbaijan following his assassination on February 28

- February 1 – 2026 Costa Rican general election: Laura Fernández Delgado is elected president of Costa Rica, and her party additionally wins a majority in the Legislative Assembly.
- February 3 – Boko Haram insurgency: Boko Haram attacks two villages in Kwara State, Nigeria, killing at least 162 people.
- February 5 – The New START treaty limiting strategic nuclear weapons between the United States and Russia expires.
- February 6–22 – The 2026 Winter Olympics are held in Milan and Cortina d'Ampezzo, Italy.
- February 6 – At least 31 people are killed and another 100 are injured in a suicide bombing at the Khadija Tul Kubra Mosque in Islamabad, Pakistan.
- February 7
  - The 2026 Men's T20 World Cup held in India and Sri Lanka begins.
  - The Transitional Presidential Council of Haiti is dissolved, transferring executive power to acting prime minister Alix Didier Fils-Aimé.
- February 8
  - 2026 Japanese general election: Incumbent Prime Minister Sanae Takaichi wins a landslide victory, securing a supermajority in the House of Representatives.
  - 2026 Thai general election and constitutional referendum: Incumbent Prime Minister Anutin Charnvirakul wins a plurality in the House of Representatives, and the Referendum to begin drafting a new constitution passes.
  - 2026 Portuguese presidential election: Socialist candidate António José Seguro is elected President of Portugal in the second round, beating Chega leader André Ventura.
- February 10 – At least nine people, including the perpetrator, are killed, and 27 are injured in a mass shooting at Tumbler Ridge Secondary School and at a residence in Tumbler Ridge, British Columbia, Canada.
- February 11 – 2026 Barbadian general election: Incumbent Prime Minister Mia Mottley wins every seat in the House of Assembly in a landslide victory.
- February 12 – 2026 Bangladeshi general election and constitutional referendum: The Bangladesh Nationalist Party led by Tarique Rahman wins a supermajority in the Jatiya Sangsad, and the referendum on the July Charter passes.
- February 13–15 – The 62nd Munich Security Conference is held.
- February 17 – President of Peru José Jerí is censured by the Congress of Peru, removing him from office. He is succeeded by José María Balcázar.
- February 16–21 – The AI Impact Summit takes place in New Delhi, India.
- February 22
  - Kim Jong Un is re-elected as the General Secretary of the Workers' Party of Korea at the 9th National Congress.
  - The 2026 Laotian parliamentary election is held.
  - 2026 Jalisco operation: A military operation in Tapalpa, Jalisco, Mexico, kills 62 people including Jalisco New Generation Cartel leader El Mencho.
- February 23 – 2025–2026 Dutch cabinet formation: Rob Jetten is sworn in as Prime Minister of the Netherlands, heading a minority government.
- February 26 – 2026 Afghanistan–Pakistan war: The government of Pakistan declares "open war" against the Taliban in Afghanistan.
- February 27 – 2026 Zona da Mata floods: Floods and landslides in the Zona da Mata region of Minas Gerais, Brazil leave at least 70 people dead and thousands of others displaced.
- February 28 – 2026 Iran war: Israel and the United States launch attacks on Iran, killing many high-profile officials, including Supreme Leader Ali Khamenei. Iran launches retaliatory strikes against Israel, as well as against US military bases in the Persian Gulf, and closes the Strait of Hormuz by attacking vessels that try to pass.

=== March ===
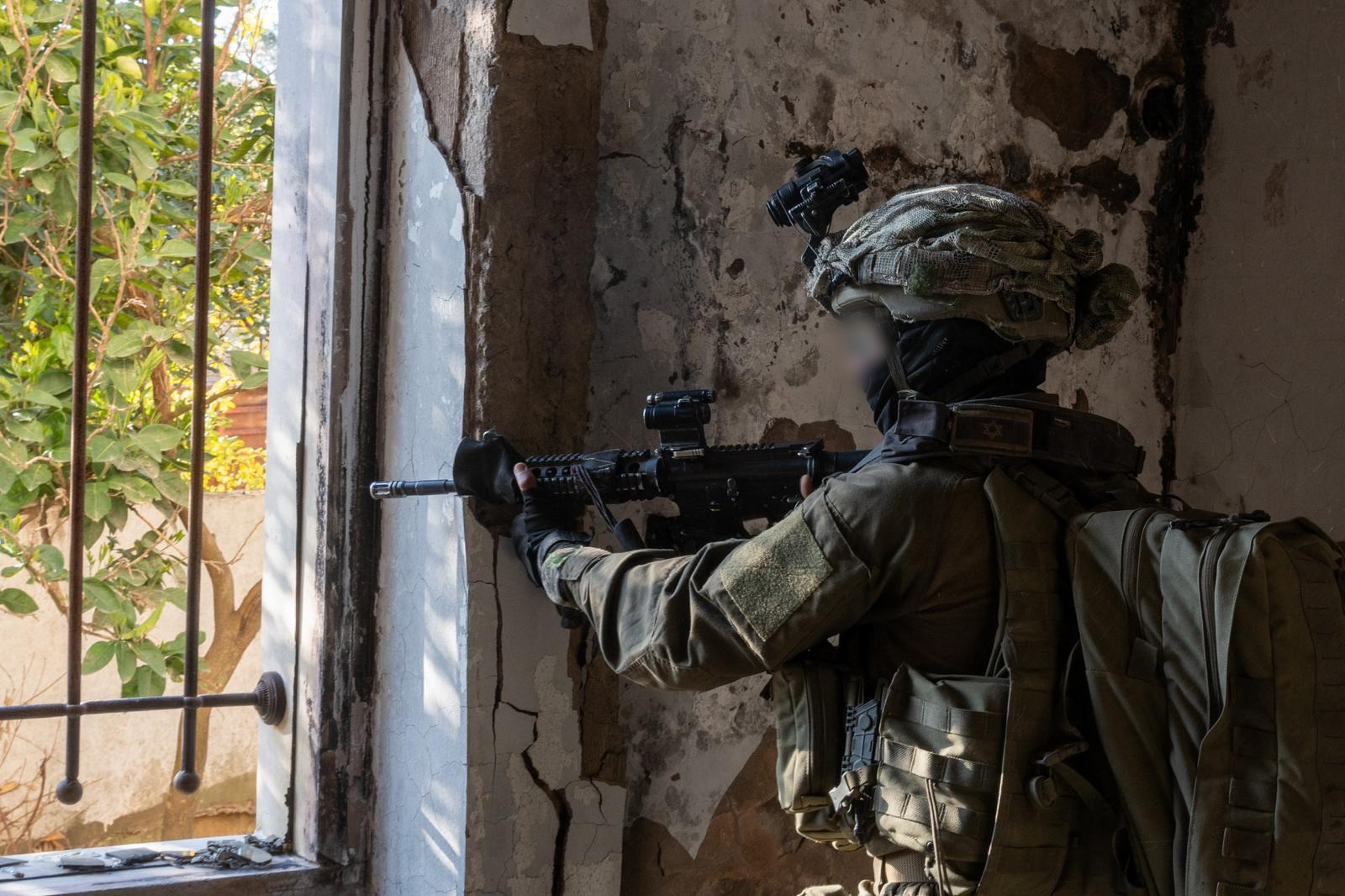
Israeli soldier in Southern Lebanon following the escalation between Hezbollah and Israel that erupted on March 2

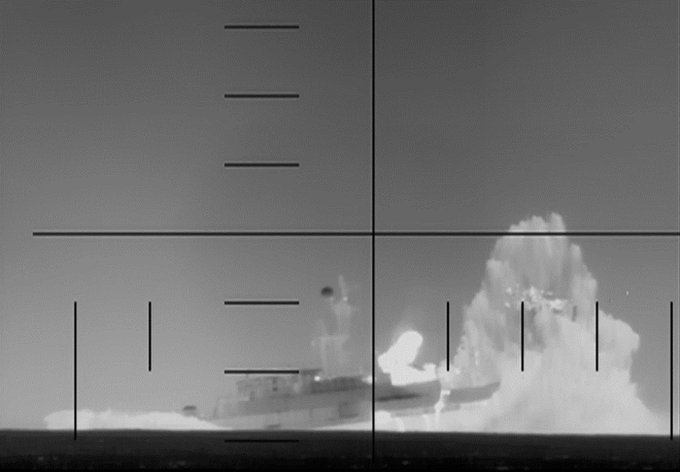
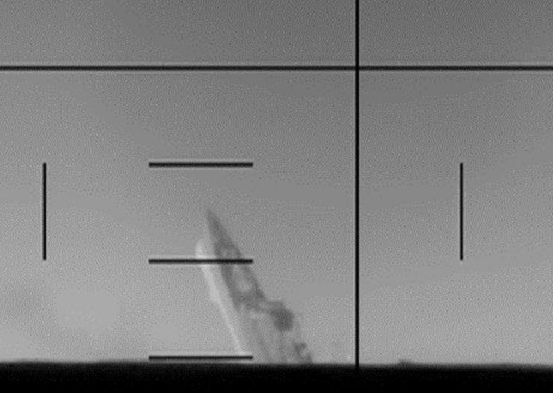
Footage of IRIS Dena being struck (left) and sinking later (right) on March 4, as released by the US Department of Defense

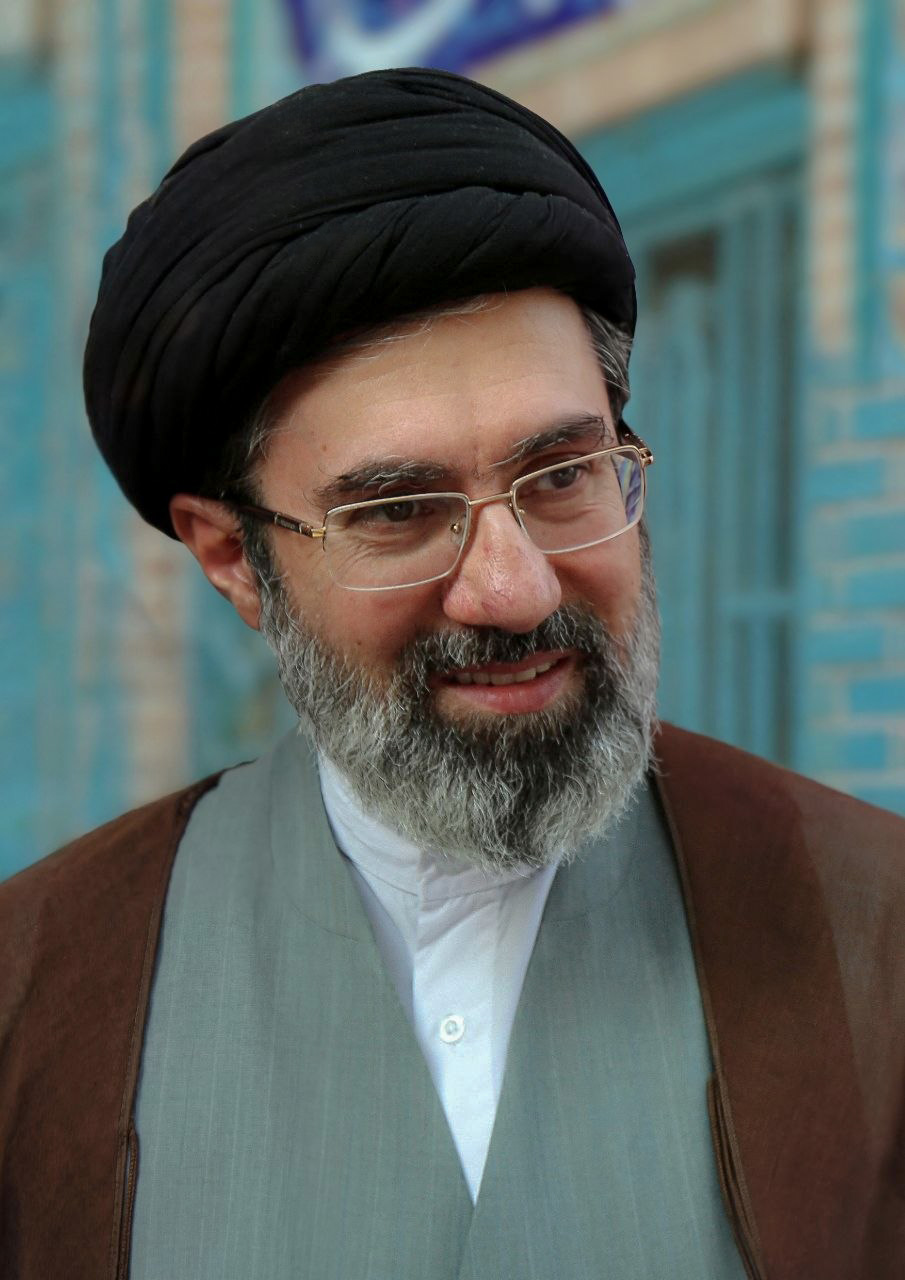
Mojtaba Khamenei, elected as the Supreme Leader of Iran on March 8 following his predecessor and father Ali Khamenei's assassination

The Lockheed C-130 Hercules that crashed near Puerto Leguízamo when operated by the Colombian Aerospace Force on March 23

- March 1 – Abiemnom massacre: At least 169 people are killed and 50 injured when armed youth from Unity State attack Abiemnom County in South Sudan.
- March 2 – 2026 Lebanon war: Hezbollah begins launching strikes against Israel in retaliation for the assassination of Iranian Supreme Leader Ali Khamenei.
- March 4 – 2026 Iran war: The United States nuclear submarine USS Charlotte sinks the Iranian warship IRIS Dena in the Indian Ocean, off Sri Lanka with a torpedo, resulting in 140 sailors missing.
- March 5 – 2026 Nepalese general election: The Rastriya Swatantra Party led by Balen Shah wins a landslide victory.
- March 5–17 – The 2026 World Baseball Classic is held in Japan and the United States.
- March 6–15 – The 2026 Winter Paralympics are held in Milan and Cortina d'Ampezzo, Italy.
- March 6–7 – 2026 Kenya floods: At least 66 people are killed after floods across Kenya.
- March 8
  - 2026 Iranian supreme leader election: Mojtaba Khamenei, the son of Ali Khamenei, is selected as the third Supreme Leader of Iran.
  - 2026 Colombian parliamentary election: President Gustavo Petro's party Historic Pact wins a plurality of seats in the Chamber of Representatives and the Senate.
  - India beats New Zealand in the 2026 Men's T20 World Cup final and secures its third title.
- March 13
  - 2026 Iran war: The United States Air Force conducts a large bombing raid on Kharg Island, a key oil export hub off the Persian Gulf coast of Iran.
  - First Secretary of the Communist Party of Cuba Miguel Díaz-Canel confirms that Cuba is in talks with the Trump administration to find solutions to the oil blockade in the country.
- March 15
  - 2026 Kazakh constitutional referendum: The new Constitution of Kazakhstan is accepted with 90% in favor.
  - 2026 North Korean parliamentary election: General Secretary Kim Jong Un's Workers' Party wins a landslide majority in the Supreme People's Assembly.
  - 2026 Vietnamese legislative election: The Communist Party led by General Secretary Tô Lâm wins almost all the seats in the National Assembly of Vietnam.
  - 2026 Republic of the Congo presidential election: Incumbent President Denis Sassou Nguesso wins reelection in a landslide victory.
- March 16 – 2026 Kabul hospital airstrike: At least 400 people are killed and more than 250 injured in Pakistani airstrikes on a hospital in Kabul, Afghanistan.
- March 17 – 2026 Iran war: Ali Larijani, the Secretary of the Supreme National Security Council, is assassinated by an Israeli airstrike.
- March 20–22 – The 2026 World Athletics Indoor Championships are held at Kujawsko-Pomorska Arena Toruń in Toruń, BiT City, Kuyavian–Pomeranian Voivodeship, Poland.
- March 22 – 2026 Slovenian parliamentary election: Incumbent Prime Minister Robert Golob wins a plurality of seats in the National Assembly.
- March 22–23 – 2026 Italian constitutional referendum: With a higher-than-expected turnout, voters reject a government-backed constitutional reform that would have separated the career paths of judges and prosecutors and split the High Council of the Judiciary into two bodies.
- March 23 – A Lockheed C-130 of the Colombian Aerospace Force crashes near Puerto Leguízamo, Colombia, killing 69 people.
- March 24
  - OpenAI announces that their flagship Sora app and API are shutting down. The app is shut down on April 26, and its API is shut down on September 24.
  - 2026 Danish general election: Incumbent Prime Minister Mette Frederiksen's coalition loses its majority in the Folketing.
  - 2026 Iran war: Iran's Ministry of Foreign Affairs addresses in a letter to the United Nations that ships not tied to either the United States or Israel can pass through the Strait of Hormuz.

=== April ===
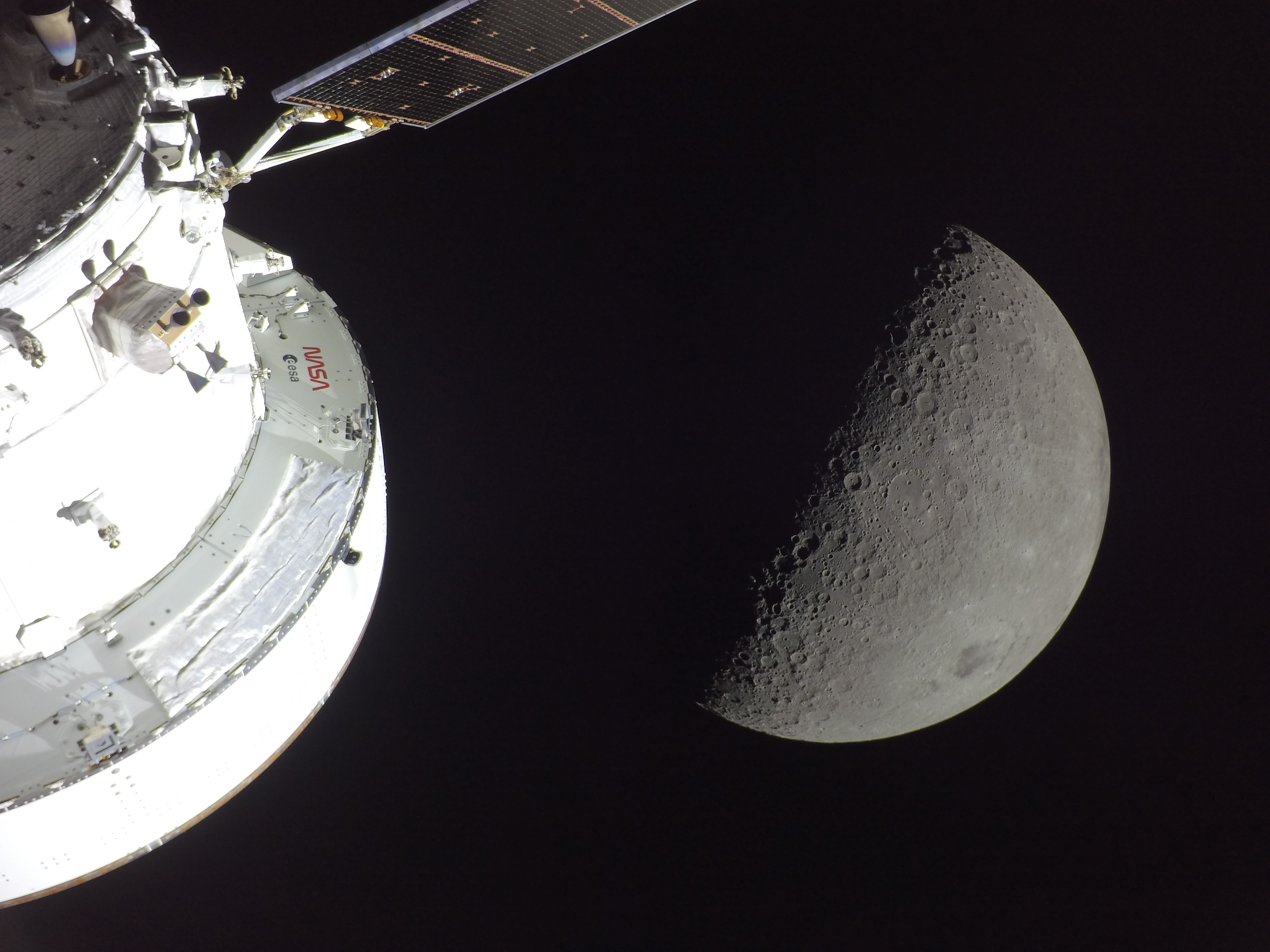
NASA's Orion spacecraft, named Integrity, being lit up by the Sun during the mission Artemis II on April 6

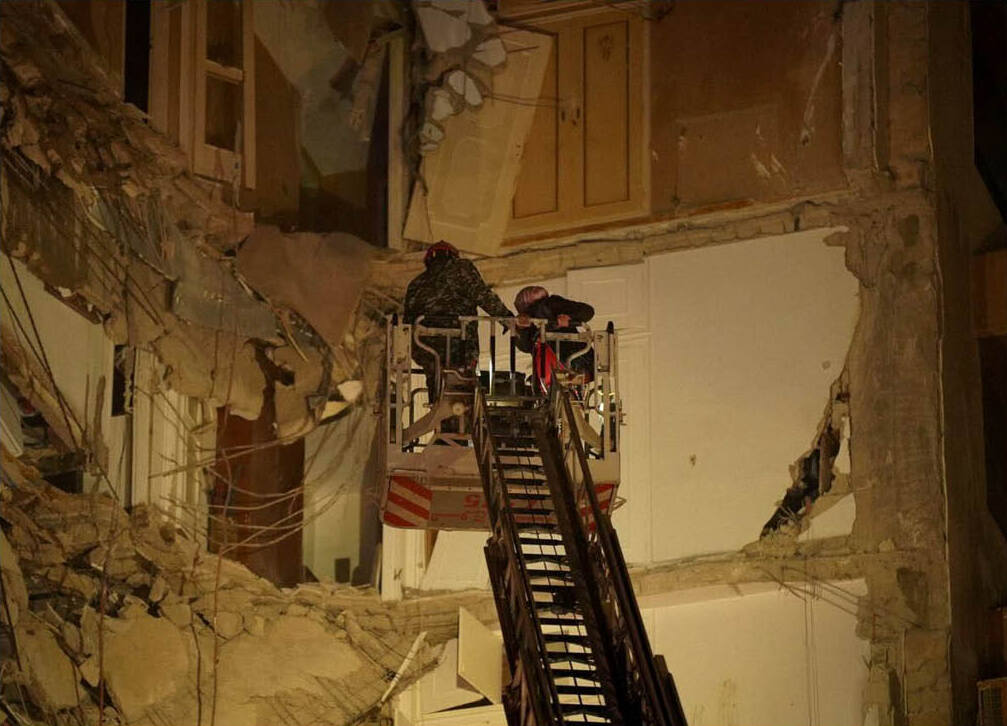
Aftermath of the April 8 Israeli attacks in Beirut, Lebanon

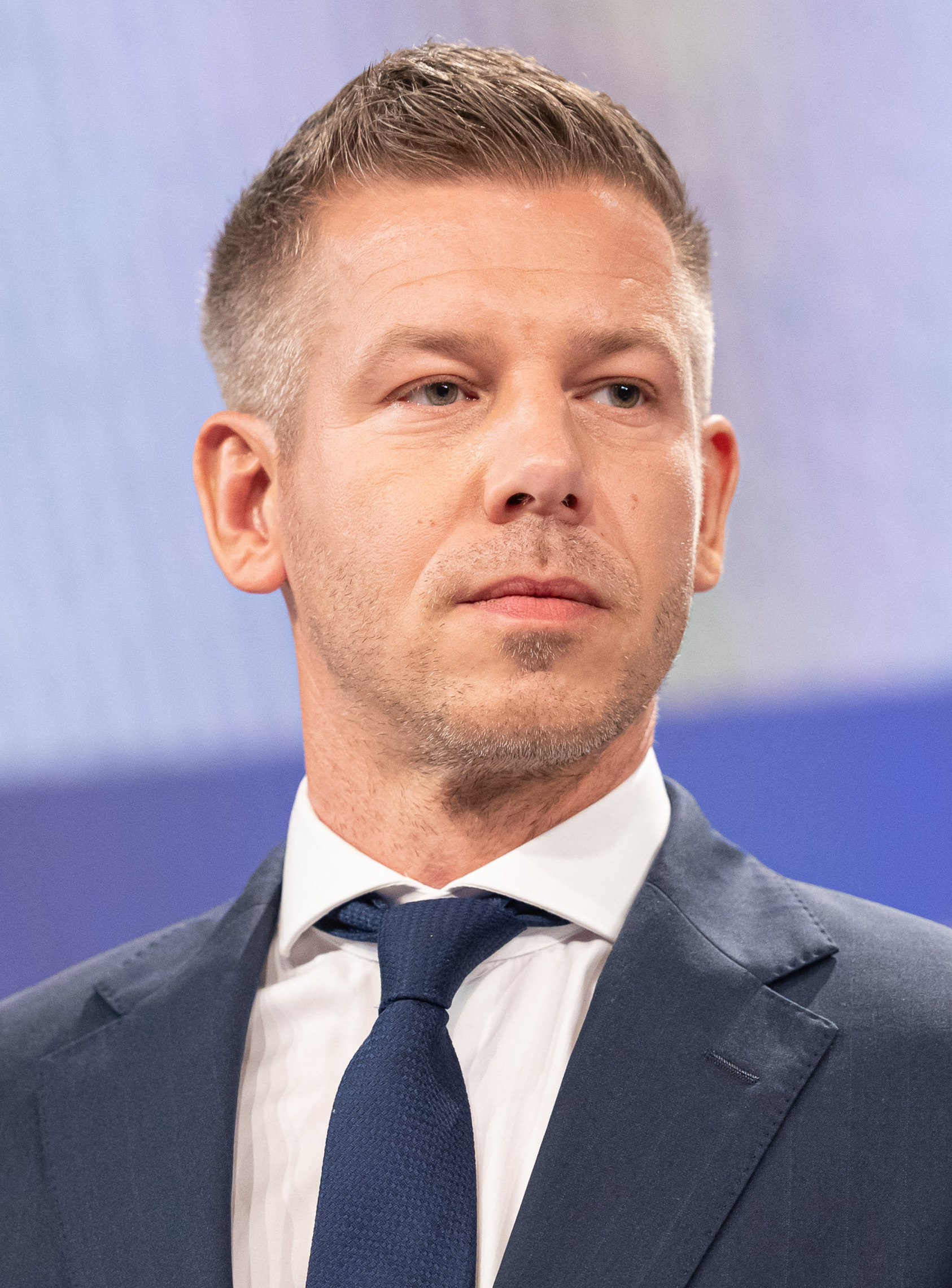
Péter Magyar, whose Tisza Party won the Hungarian parliamentary election on April 12, ending 16 year of Viktor Orbán's rule

- April 1 – NASA launches the Artemis II lunar flyby mission, marking the first crewed flight beyond low Earth orbit since Apollo 17 in 1972.
- April 6 – The crew of Artemis II breaks the record for the furthest humans have ever been from Earth, reaching a maximum distance of 252,756 miles (406,771 km) as they travel around the far side of the Moon.
- April 7
  - 2026 Vietnamese presidential election: The National Assembly of Vietnam elects General Secretary Tô Lâm as the new president of Vietnam, replacing Lương Cường.
  - 2026 Iran war: Following an ultimatum from Trump regarding the Strait of Hormuz, the United States and Iran agree on a two-week ceasefire.
- April 8 – Israel launches a series of airstrikes across Lebanon, targeting Hezbollah infrastructure. More than 300 people are killed and over 1,100 injured.
- April 10
  - 2026 Djiboutian presidential election: Incumbent President Ismaïl Omar Guelleh is re-elected for a sixth term.
  - The crew of Artemis II successfully returns to Earth, splashing down safely in the Pacific Ocean near San Diego, California, United States. The four crew members are extracted from the capsule and taken by helicopter to the USS John P. Murtha.
- April 11 – 2026 Iraqi presidential election: The Iraqi Parliament elects Nizar Amidi of the Patriotic Union of Kurdistan (PUK) as the new President of Iraq, winning with 227 votes in the second round.
- April 12
  - 2026 Hungarian parliamentary election: Incumbent Prime Minister Viktor Orbán loses re-election in a landslide to Péter Magyar's Tisza Party, ending 16 years of Fidesz–KDNP rule.
  - 2026 Beninese presidential election: Independent candidate Romuald Wadagni wins in a landslide with over 94% of the vote.
- April 13 – 2026 Iran war: A blockade of Iranian ports by the United States takes effect, with President Trump warning that any Iranian vessels attempting to challenge it will be "immediately eliminated". Maritime authorities advise ships in the region to expect increased military activity and possible interception procedures.
- April 16 – 2026 Lebanon war: A US-brokered 10-day ceasefire takes effect between Israel and Lebanon, following ambassador-level talks in the White House.
- April 19 – 2026 Bulgarian parliamentary election: The Progressive Bulgaria coalition, led by former President Rumen Radev, wins a landslide victory, securing 44% of the vote and an outright majority of seats.
- April 21 – 2026 Iran war: US President Trump announces a further extension of the ceasefire until an Iranian proposal is submitted and conversations are concluded at the request of Pakistan.
- April 25 – 2026 Mali offensives: The Azawad Liberation Front and JNIM launch several large-scale attacks, targeting major cities across Mali, capturing Kidal and parts of Gao, Mopti, and Sevare.

=== May ===
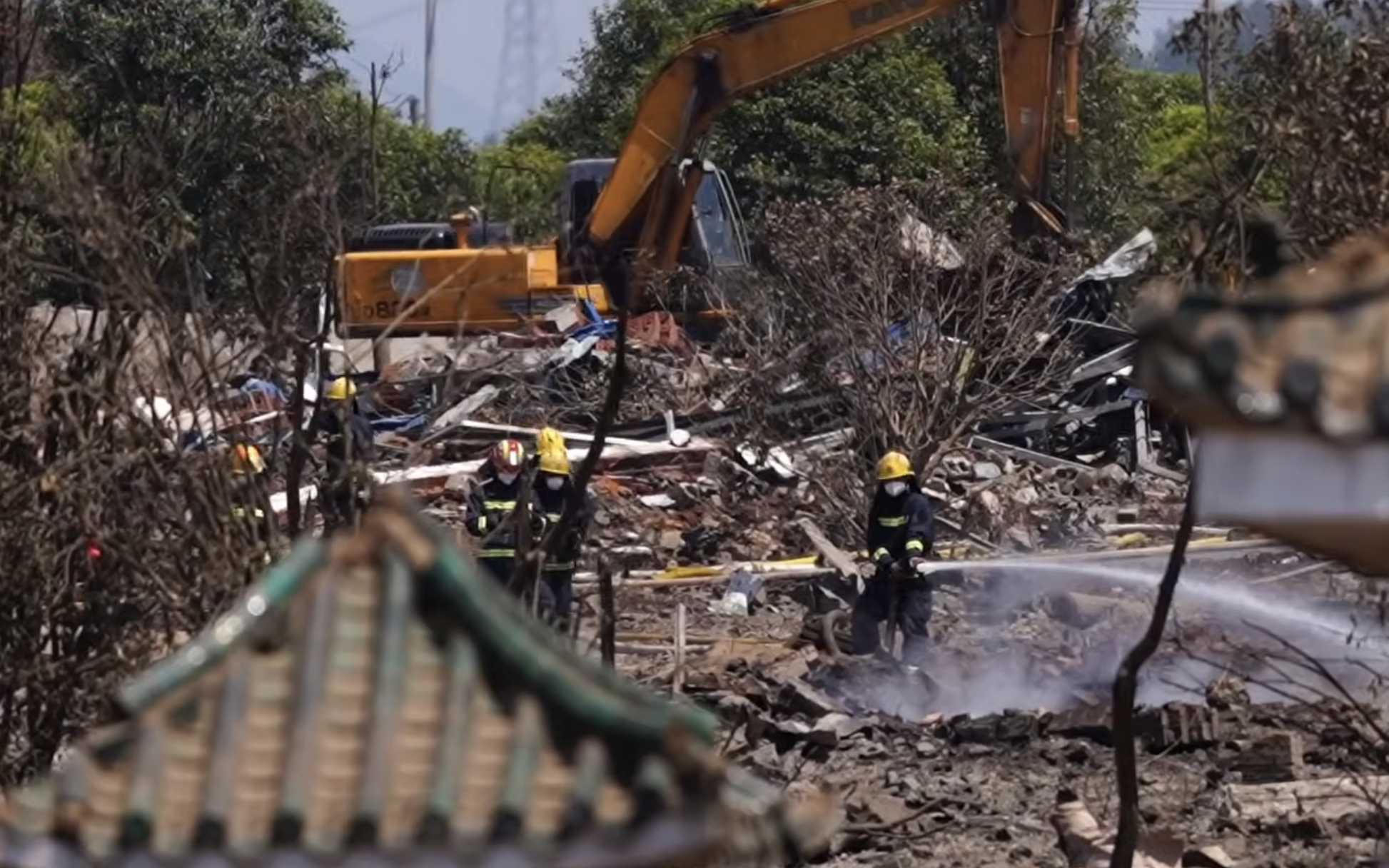
Firefighters at the scene of the Liuyang fireworks factory explosion, which occurred on May 4

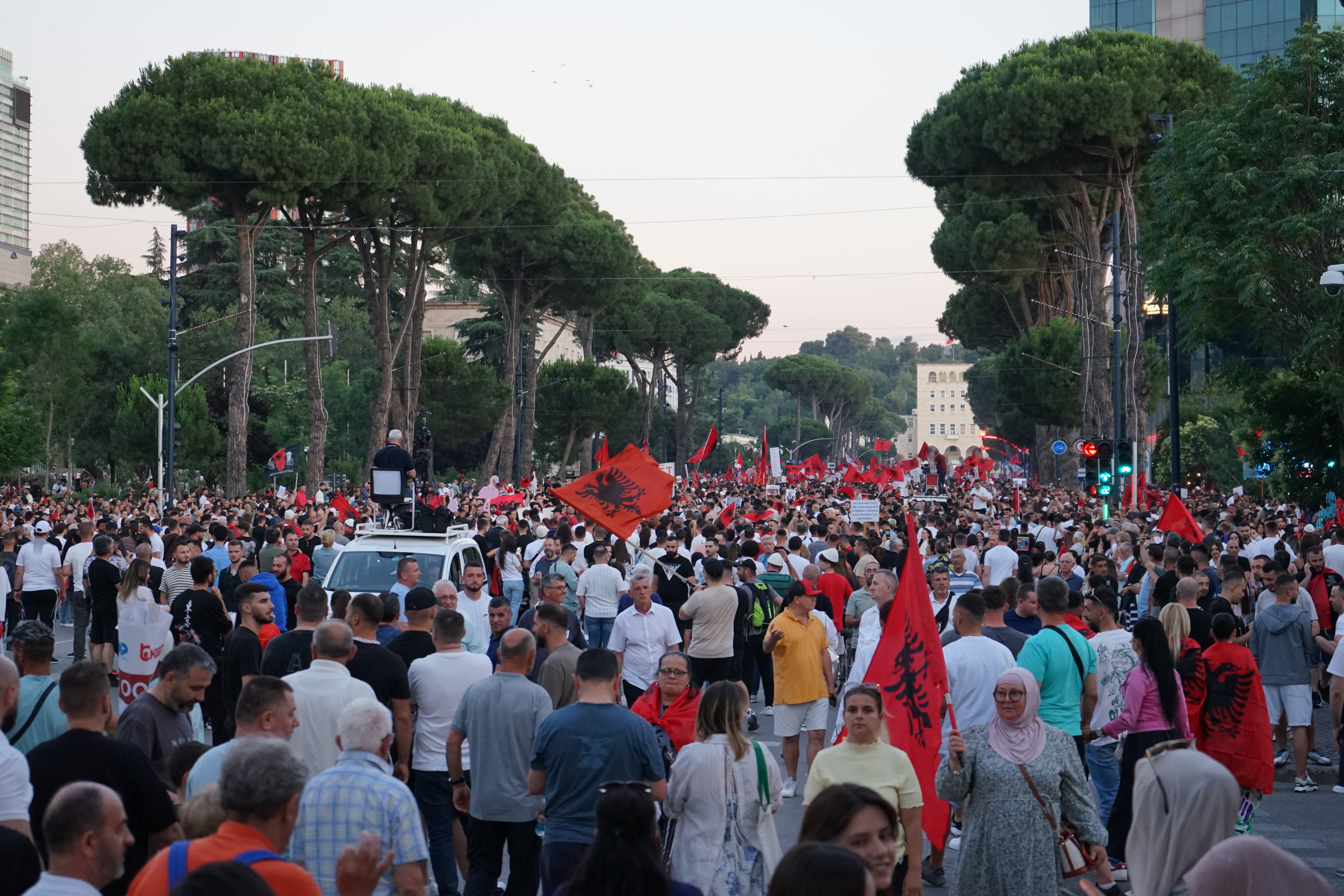
Protesters in Albania's capital Tirana during the Flamingo Revolution, which started on May 31

- May 1 – The United Arab Emirates leaves OPEC, ending six decades of membership and removing one of the organization's largest oil producers.
- May 4
  - An explosion at a fireworks factory in Liuyang, Hunan, China kills 37 people and injures 51 others.
  - Sudanese civil war: Rapid Support Forces launch drone attacks at several targets in Khartoum, Sudan, including the Khartoum International Airport in Khartoum, Sudan. Drone strikes are also reported at the Signal Corps in Khartoum Bahri and Al-Markhiyat camp in northern Omdurman. Additionally, the Sudan Army's air defenses intercept drone strikes at the airport.
- May 12 – 2026 Bahamian general election: Incumbent Prime Minister Philip Davis wins a second term in office.
- May 12–16 – The Eurovision Song Contest 2026 is held in Vienna, Austria, following their win at the Eurovision Song Contest 2025. Bulgarian contestant Dara wins with the song "Bangaranga", marking the first time Bulgaria has won the contest.
- May 15 – Gaza war: An Israeli strike assassinates Izz al-Din al-Haddad, commander of the Izz al-Din al-Qassam Brigades and leader of Hamas in the Gaza Strip.
- May 16 – 2026 Ituri Province Ebola epidemic: The World Health Organization declares an Ebola outbreak caused by Bundibugyo ebolavirus in the Democratic Republic of the Congo and Uganda a Public Health Emergency of International Concern.
- May 17 – 2026 Cape Verdean parliamentary election: Incumbent Prime Minister Ulisses Correia e Silva loses reelection to PAICV leader Francisco Carvalho.
- May 20 – Former First Secretary of the Communist Party of Cuba Raúl Castro is indicted by the United States over the 1996 shootdown of Brothers to the Rescue aircraft.
- May 22
  - The 2026 European heatwaves begin, bringing record-breaking temperatures to several European countries and causing thousands of deaths over the next several weeks.
  - A gas explosion at the Liushenyu coal mine in Shanxi, China, kills 82 people.
- May 24 – 2026 Cypriot legislative election: The Democratic Rally led by Annita Demetriou wins a plurality of seats.
- May 30 – 2026 Maltese general election: The Labour Party led by incumbent Prime Minister Robert Abela wins their fourth consecutive election.
- May 31
  - 2026 Guinean parliamentary election: Parties supporting incumbent President Mamady Doumbouya win the election.
  - Flamingo Revolution: Following small protests in the village of Zvërnec, major protests erupt in Albania over a proposed luxury development involving Donald Trump's son-in-law Jared Kushner and his firm Affinity Partners, as well as broader discontent with Prime Minister Edi Rama's government.

=== June ===
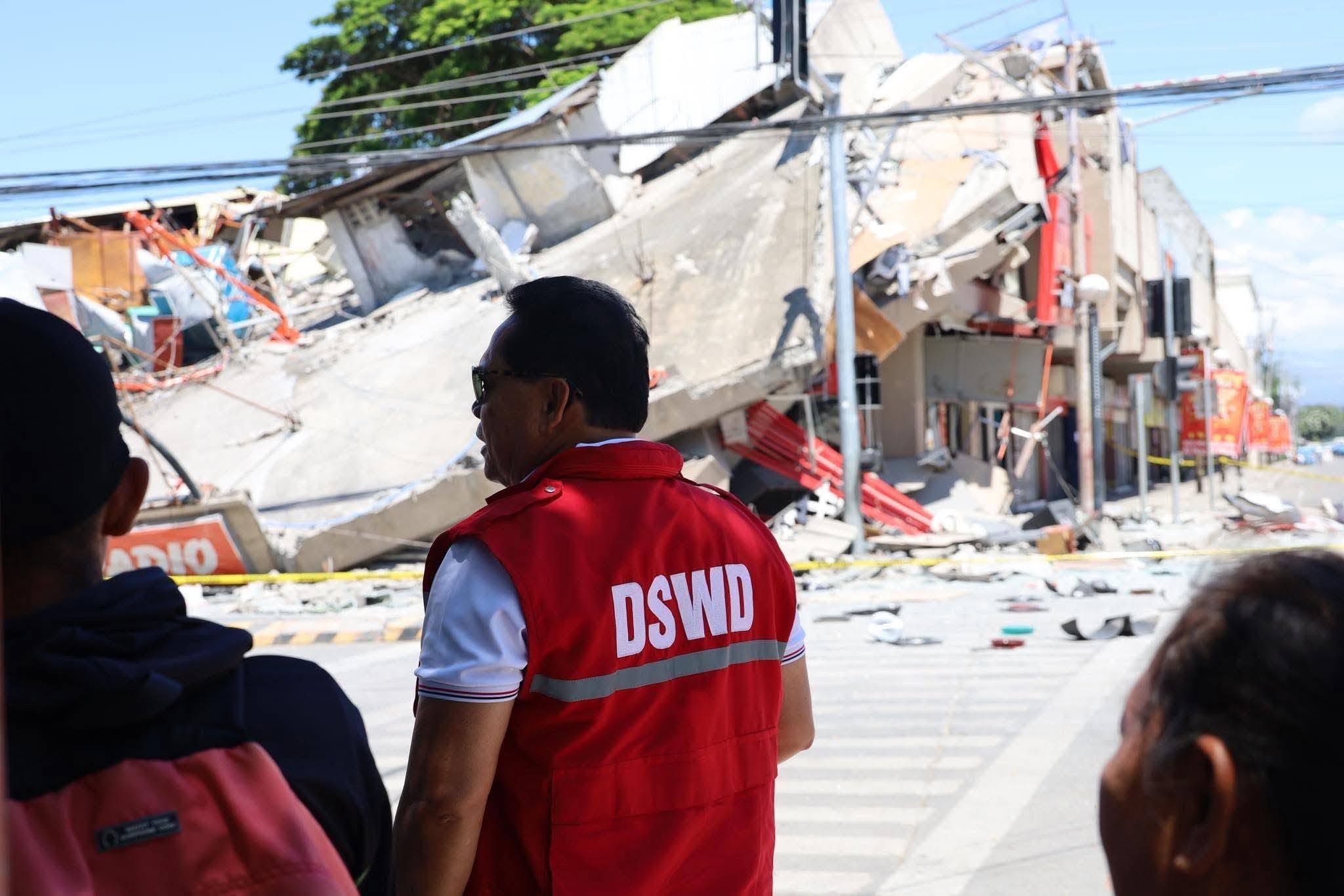
DSWD personnel inspecting a collapsed commercial building in General Santos following the Mindanao earthquake on June 8

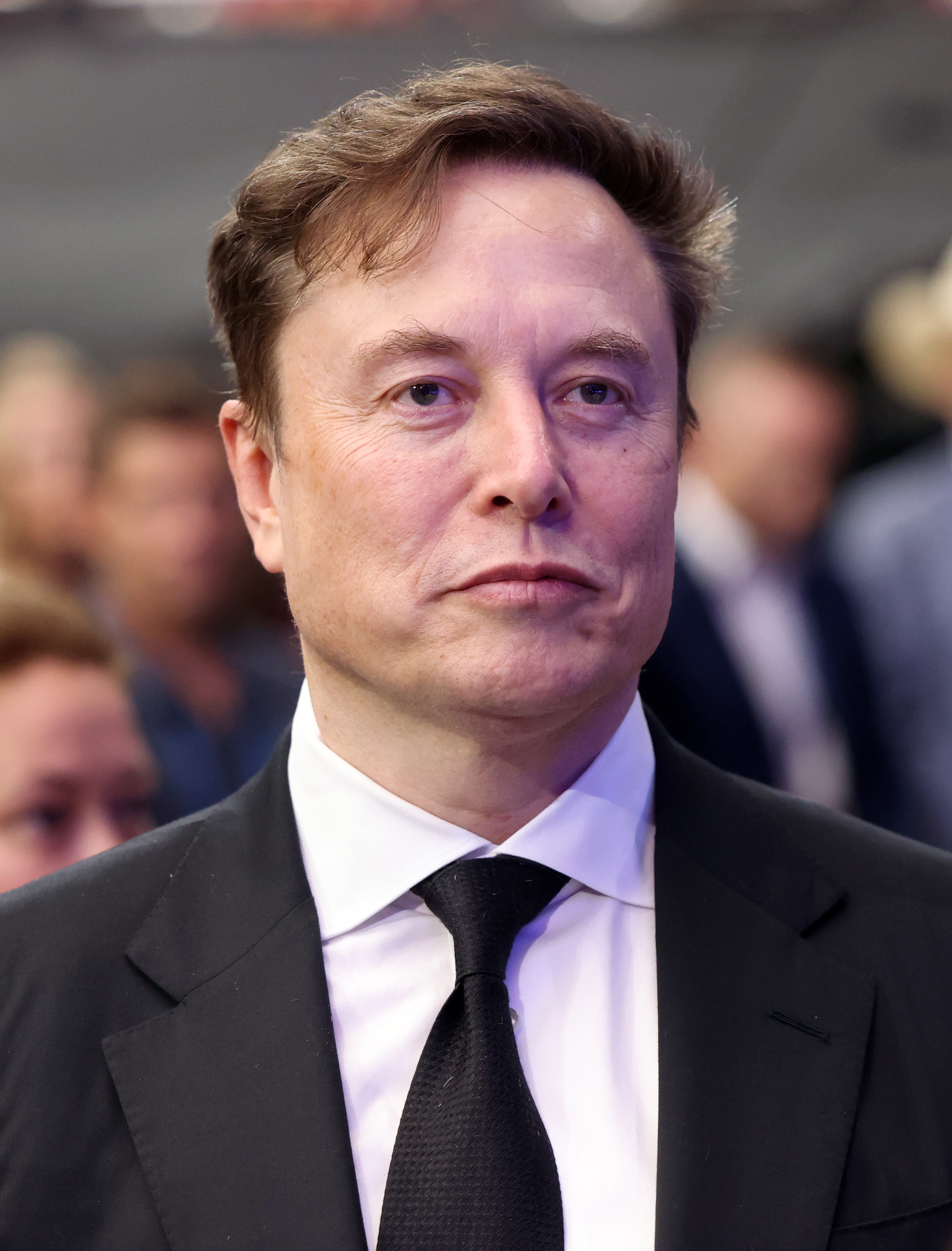
Elon Musk, who became the first U.S. dollar trillionaire on June 12

CCTV footage of the moment at which the helicopter involved in the Rio de Janeiro mid-air collision on June 14 falls to the ground

Venezuelan rescue teams at destroyed buildings in La Guaira after the Venezuela earthquakes on June 24

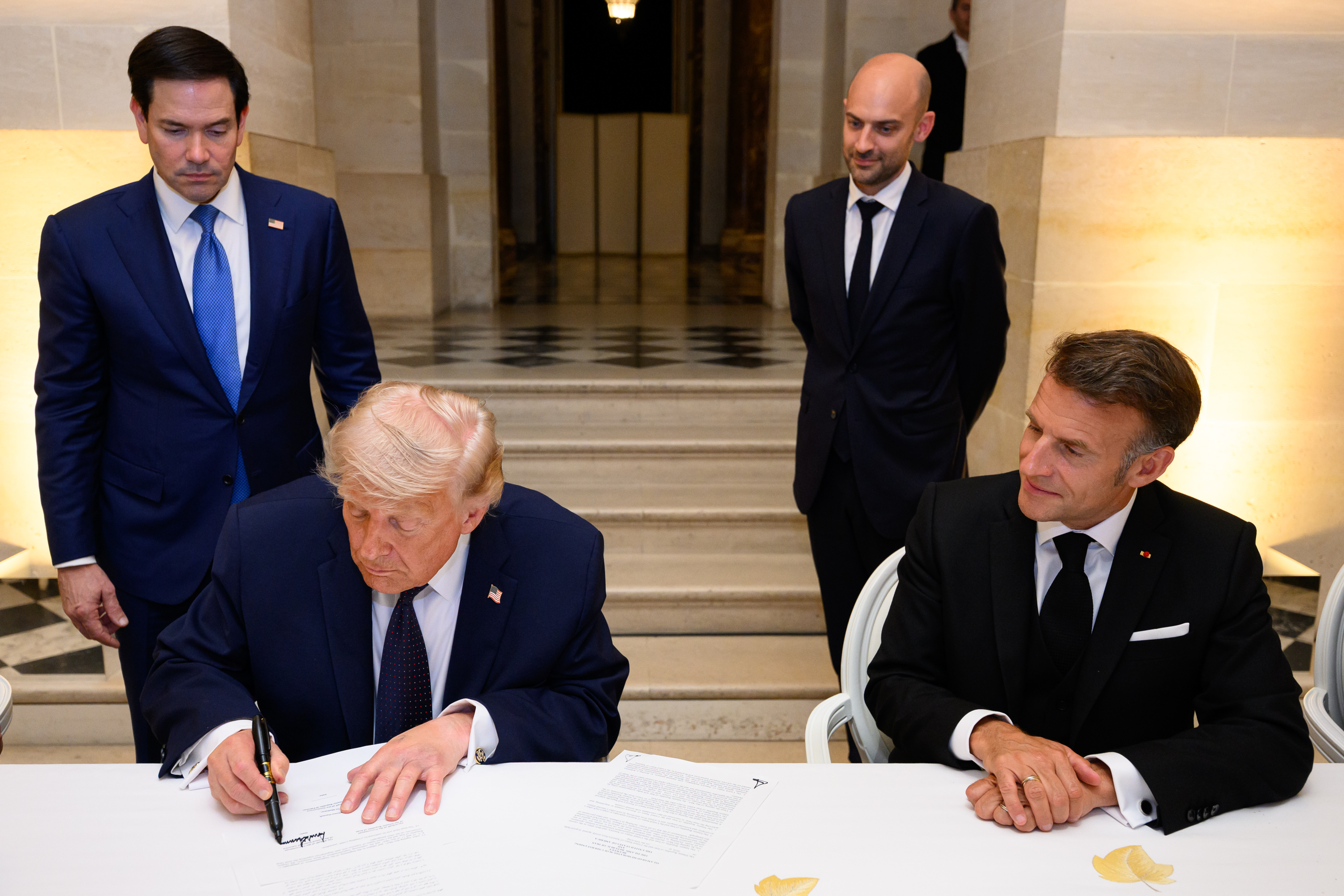
The signing of the Islamabad Memorandum on June 17 in order to end the Iran war

- June 1 – 2026 Ethiopian general election: The Prosperity Party, led by incumbent Prime Minister Abiy Ahmed, wins reelection.
- June 6 – 2026 Delhi Jantar Mantar protests: A series of demonstrations takes place in Jantar Mantar, New Delhi, initiated by the Cockroach Janta Party, an Indian youth-based satirical political movement, along with other student organisations.
- June 7
  - 2026 Armenian parliamentary election: The Civil Contract, led by incumbent Prime Minister Nikol Pashinyan, wins reelection.
  - 2026 Kosovan parliamentary election: Amid the political deadlock, Vetëvendosje, led by incumbent Prime Minister Albin Kurti, wins a plurality of seats.
  - 2026 Peruvian general election: Popular Force leader Keiko Fujimori narrowly defeats Together for Peru leader Roberto Sánchez in the presidential runoff. Left-wing parties gain a majority in the Chamber of Deputies but tie in the reestablished Senate.
- June 8 – A powerful magnitude 7.8 earthquake strikes the Philippines, the strongest in the country since 1976. 107 are killed and 1,320 are injured.
- June 9 – Turkey and Saudi Arabia sign an agreement to revive the 19th century Hejaz railway.
- June 10 – In Barcelona, Spain, the blessing ceremony of the Sagrada Família's tallest tower by Pope Leo XIV is held, exactly 100 years after the death of architect Antoni Gaudí. Pope Leo XIV consecrates and opens the central tower of Jesus Christ. The Sagrada Família is the world's tallest church.
- June 11 – The National Oceanic and Atmospheric Administration declares the onset of an El Niño event in the tropical Pacific, and forecasts a 63% chance that it will rank among the largest since records began in 1950.
- June 11 – July 19 – The 2026 FIFA World Cup is held in Canada, Mexico, and the United States, and is won by Spain.
- June 12 – Elon Musk becomes the first US dollar trillionaire with the initial public offering of SpaceX.
- June 12 – July 5 – The 2026 Women's T20 World Cup is held in England and Wales, and is won by Australia.
- June 13–14 – The 2026 24 Hours of Le Mans is held in Le Mans, France.
- June 14 – A mid-air collision between two helicopters in Rio de Janeiro, Brazil, kills six people, including American singer-songwriter Oliver Tree, Argentine YouTuber Gaspi, Argentine director and screenwriter Lucas A. Vignale and Brazilian music producer Lucas Frota.
- June 15–17 – The United States and Iran announce and sign the Islamabad Memorandum, a 14-point agreement to end the 2026 Iran war, reopen the Strait of Hormuz, lift the U.S. blockade of Iranian ports, and begin a 60-day negotiation period on Iran's nuclear programme; Israel says it will not withdraw from territory it has seized in southern Lebanon.
- June 21 – 2026 Colombian presidential election: Right-wing outsider Abelardo de la Espriella wins the election in a runoff against left-wing candidate Iván Cepeda.
- June 22 – Keir Starmer announces his resignation as Prime Minister of the United Kingdom, prompting a leadership election.
- June 24 – Two consecutive earthquakes with magnitudes of M_{w} 7.2, and M_{w} 7.5 shake western Venezuela. At least 6,500 people are killed, with thousands injured or missing and widespread damage across the country.

=== July ===
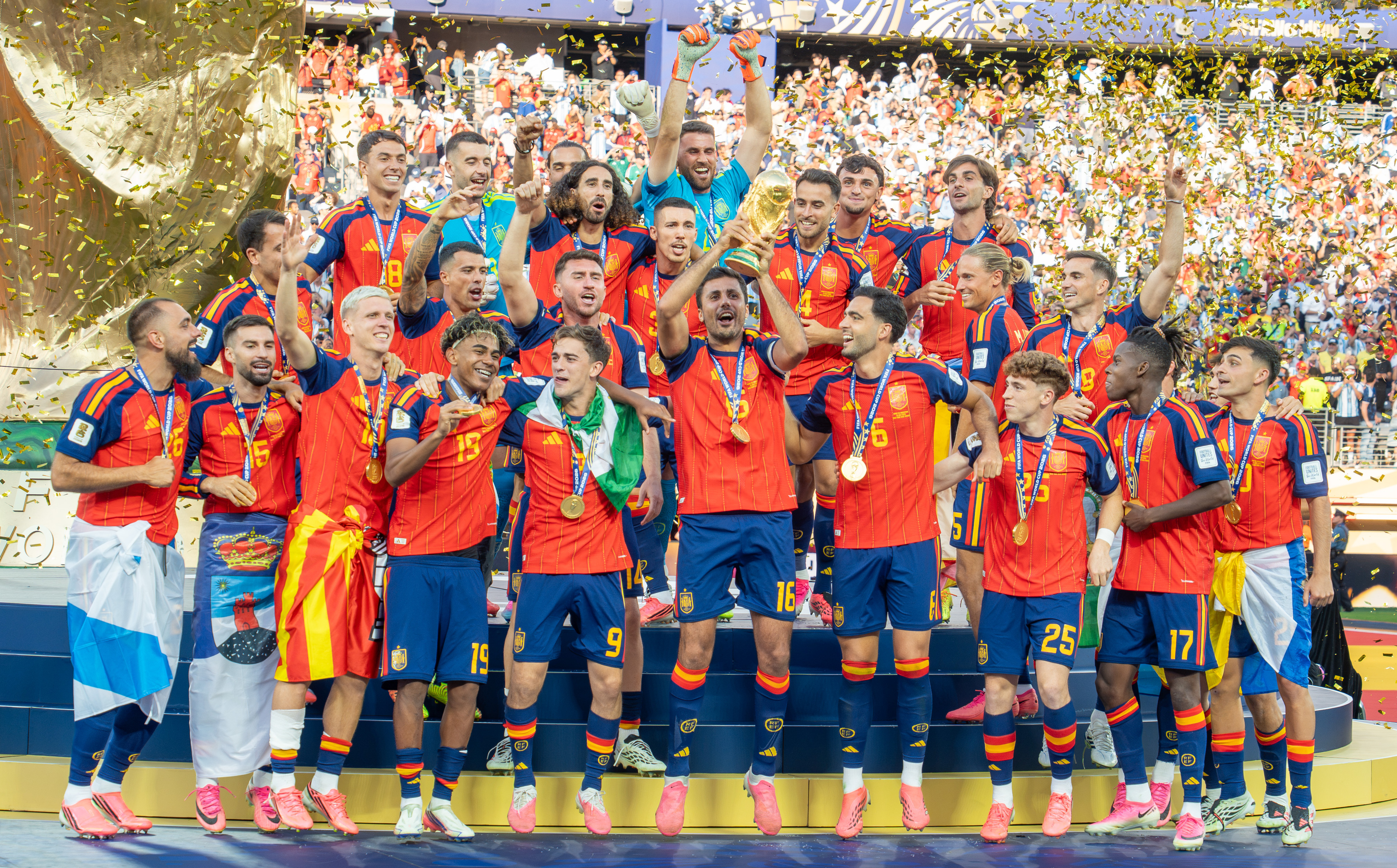
Spanish captain Rodri lifting the FIFA World Cup trophy after Spain defeated Argentina 1–0 at the 2026 FIFA World Cup final on July 19

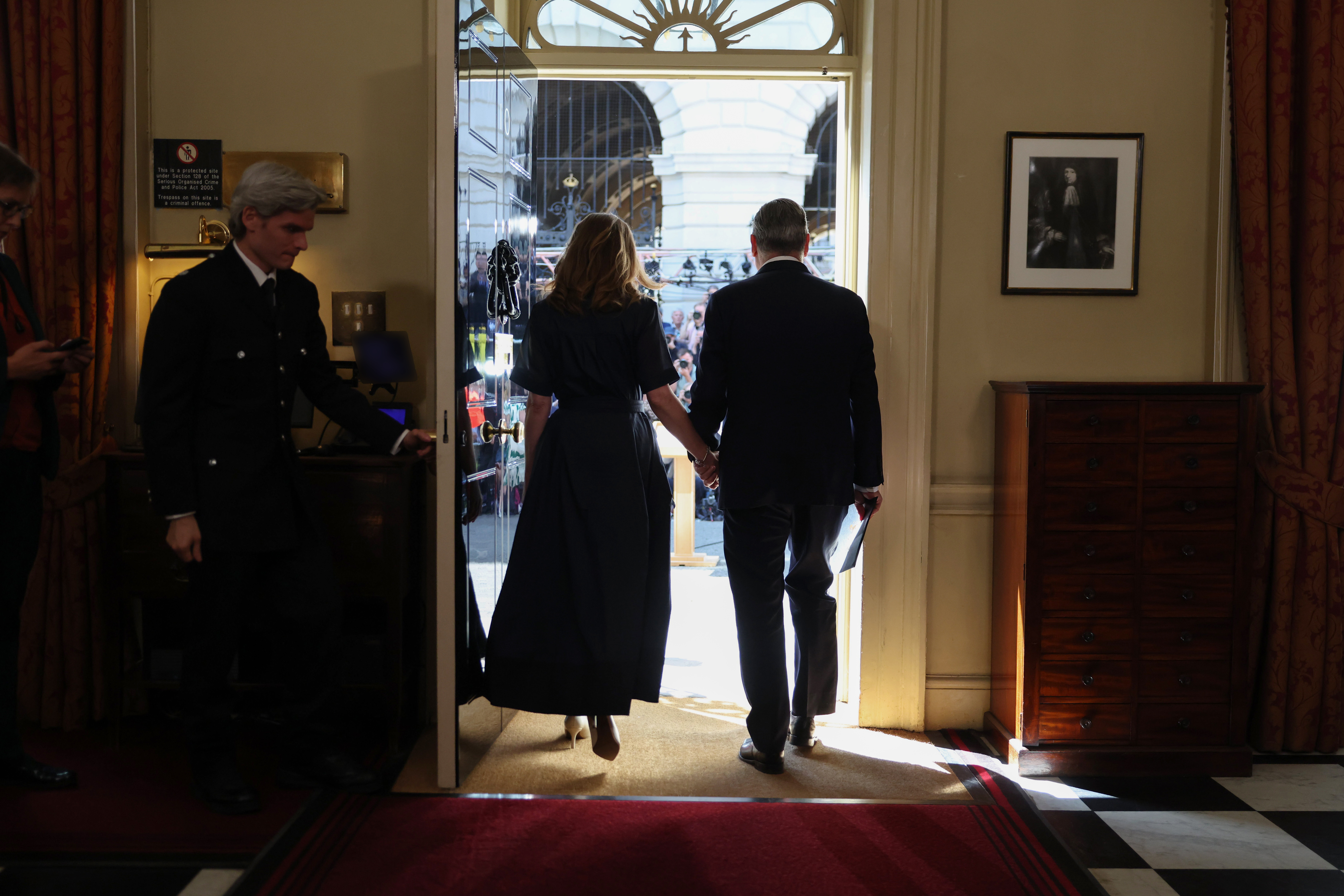
Keir Starmer and Victoria Starmer leaving 10 Downing Street and Andy Burnham subsequently becoming Prime Minister of the United Kingdom on July 20

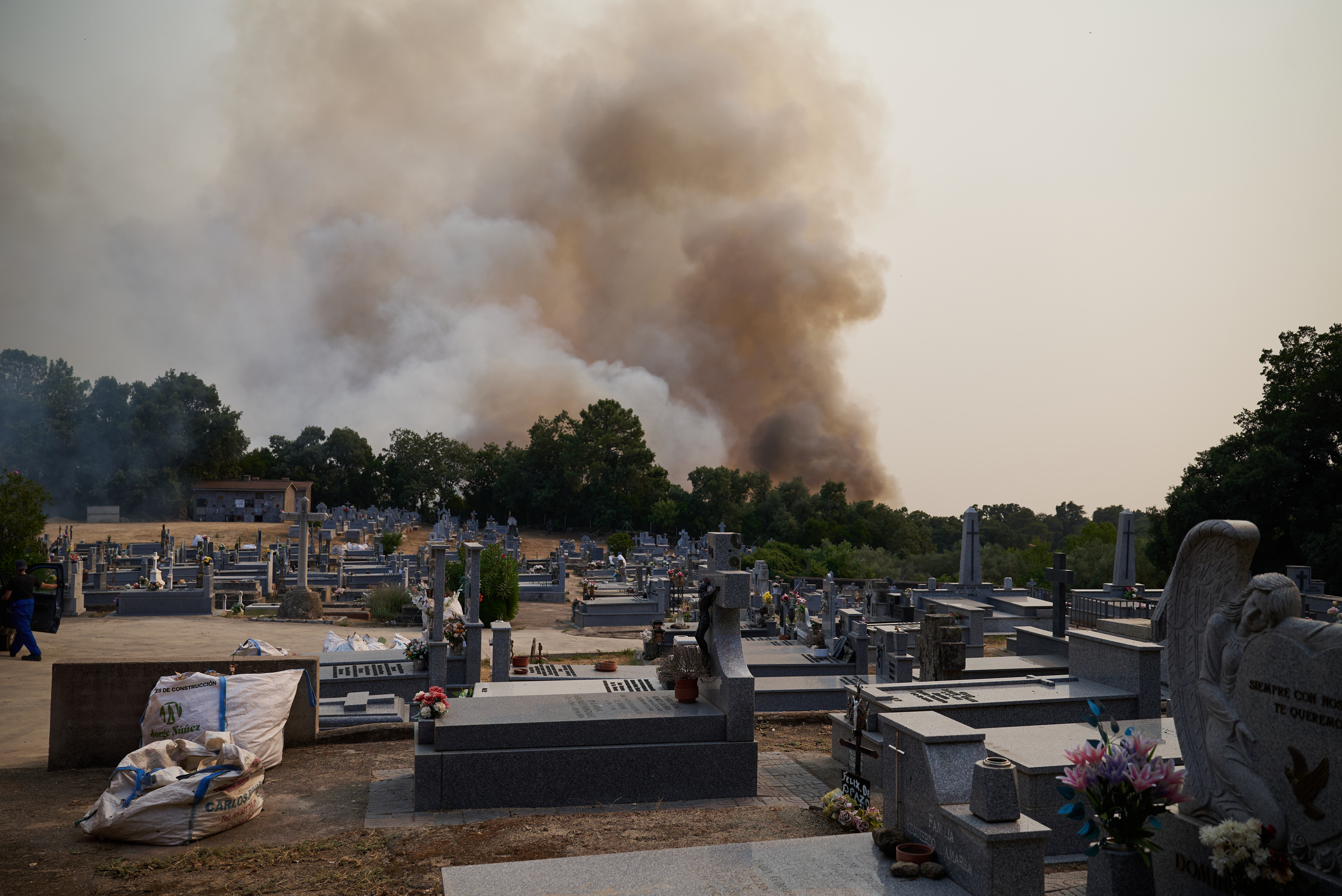
Piedralaves Cemetery in Ávila during the Spain wildfires on July 27

JSDF personnel inspecting a collapsed house after the Kumamoto earthquake on July 28

Security footage of migrants returning to Morocco following a border incident between the country and Spain at Ceuta started on July 30

- July 1 – 2026 Écône consecrations: Members of the Society of Saint Pius X (SSPX) in Écône, Switzerland, consecrate four bishops against the direct orders of Pope Leo XIV, triggering a religious schism between SSPX and the Catholic Church.
- July 2 – The 2026 Algerian parliamentary election is held.
- July 3–9 – The state funeral of Ali Khamenei, the Supreme Leader of Iran assassinated during the 2026 Iran war, is held.
- July 4–18 – The inaugural Nations Championship – Southern Hemisphere Series, an international rugby union tournament, is held.
- July 6 – Hamas announces the resignation of its civil administration under the Gaza peace plan.
- July 7 – The International Olympic Committee lifts the ban on the Russian Olympic Committee, allowing its athletes to participate in future Olympic Games.
- July 7–8 – The 2026 NATO summit is held in Ankara, Turkey.
- July 8 – 2026 Iran war: The Islamabad Memorandum between the United States and Iran breaks down, with U.S. President Trump saying the agreement is "over" following renewed U.S. strikes on Iranian targets.
- July 12–13 – A fire at the Rong Beer Na Lat Phrao live-music venue in Chatuchak district, Bangkok, kills 34 people and injures more than 70 others.
- July 18
  - The world record for the mile run is broken by British runner Josh Kerr at the London Athletics Meet, with a time of 3:42.66 surpassing the previous record held by Hicham El Guerrouj since 1999.
  - 77 people are killed and 26 remain missing when the MV Barima sinks in Guyana.
- July 19
  - 2026 São Toméan presidential election: Incumbent President Carlos Vila Nova is reelected for a second term.
  - 2026 FIFA World Cup final: Spain beat defending champions Argentina 1–0 during extra time to win a second FIFA World Cup title after 16 years. Spanish forward Ferran Torres scores the only goal in the 106th minute.
- July 20
  - Andy Burnham is appointed by King Charles III as Prime Minister of the United Kingdom, succeeding Keir Starmer.
  - 2026 Iran war: The Houthis announce a maritime blockade against Saudi Arabia on the Bab el-Mandeb strait.
  - Nicaraguan co-president Daniel Ortega announces an end to elections within Nicaragua.
- July 22–30 – European heatwaves: Wildfires in France, Portugal and Spain force 300,000 people to evacuate their homes. French officials call it the worst wildfire emergency in decades, while officials in Madrid describe it as the worst the region has ever experienced.
- July 23–August 2 – The 2026 Commonwealth Games are held in Glasgow, Scotland.
- July 28 – An earthquake strikes Kumamoto Prefecture in southern Japan with a magnitude of M_{ww} 6.8(M_{JMA} 7.1) at a depth of 10 km (6.2 mi), killing at least 30 and injuring over 60.
- July 30
  - 2026 Iran war: Saudi Arabia announces the establishment of a 14-nation military alliance to restore and protect freedom of navigation through the Red Sea amid the Iran conflict and ongoing crisis in the area stimulated by the Houthis.
  - 2026 Ceuta migrant crisis: Approximately 80,000 people illegally enter Ceuta, Spain with smaller numbers attempting to cross into Melilla, having swam from Morocco. This follows a Supreme Court of Spain decision prohibiting the hot return of migrants arriving by sea. At least 141 people are killed.
  - An avalanche on Broad Peak in the Karakoram range of Pakistan kills ten climbers, including Nirmal Purja, Pur Bahadur Gurung, Nadhira Al Harthy and Kili Pemba Sherpa.
  - The Republic of Nauru officially changes its name to the Republic of Naoero.

=== August ===
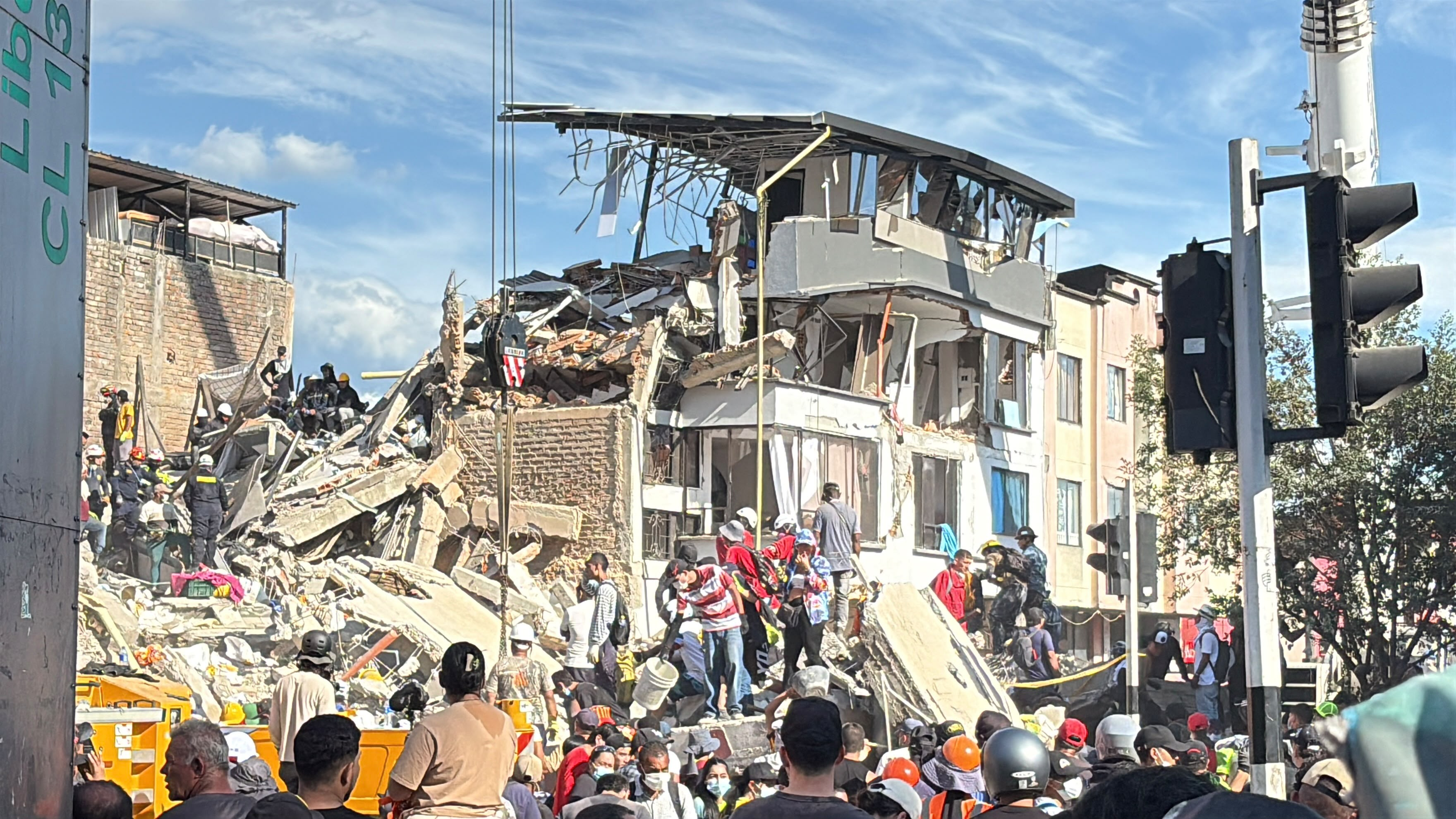
Collapsed building in Pereira after the Colombia earthquake on August 10

Solar eclipse of August 12, 2026, as seen from León, Spain

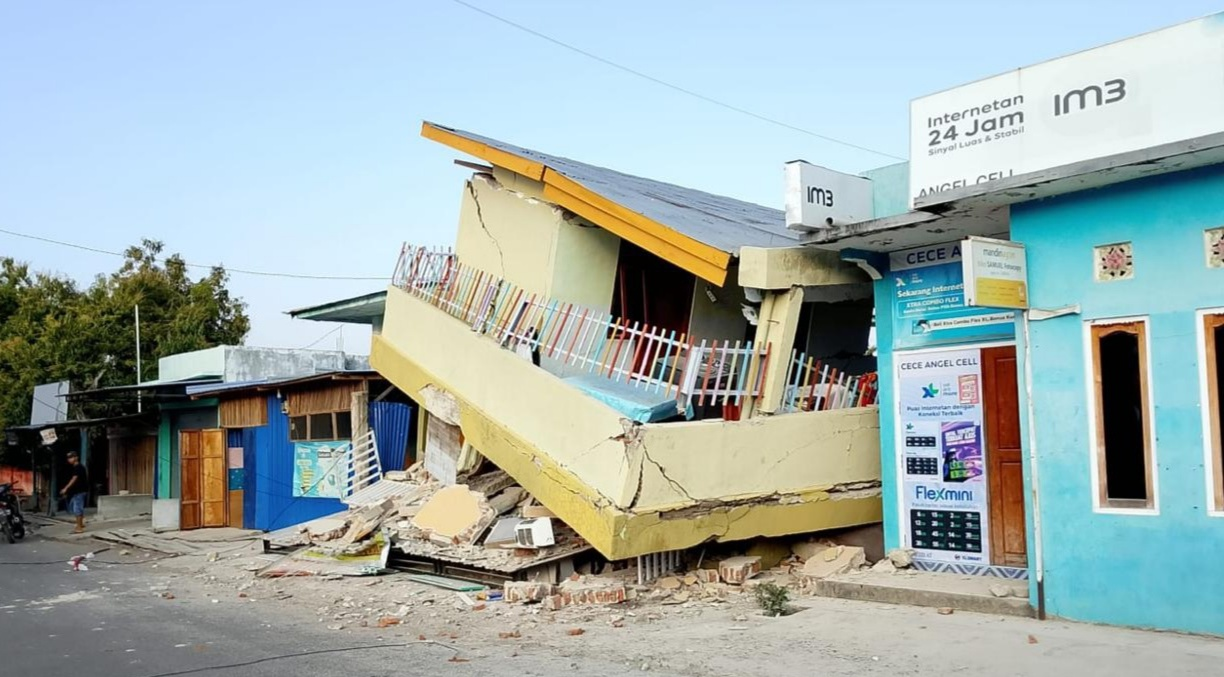
A building destroyed in East Manggarai Regency after the Flores earthquake on August 15

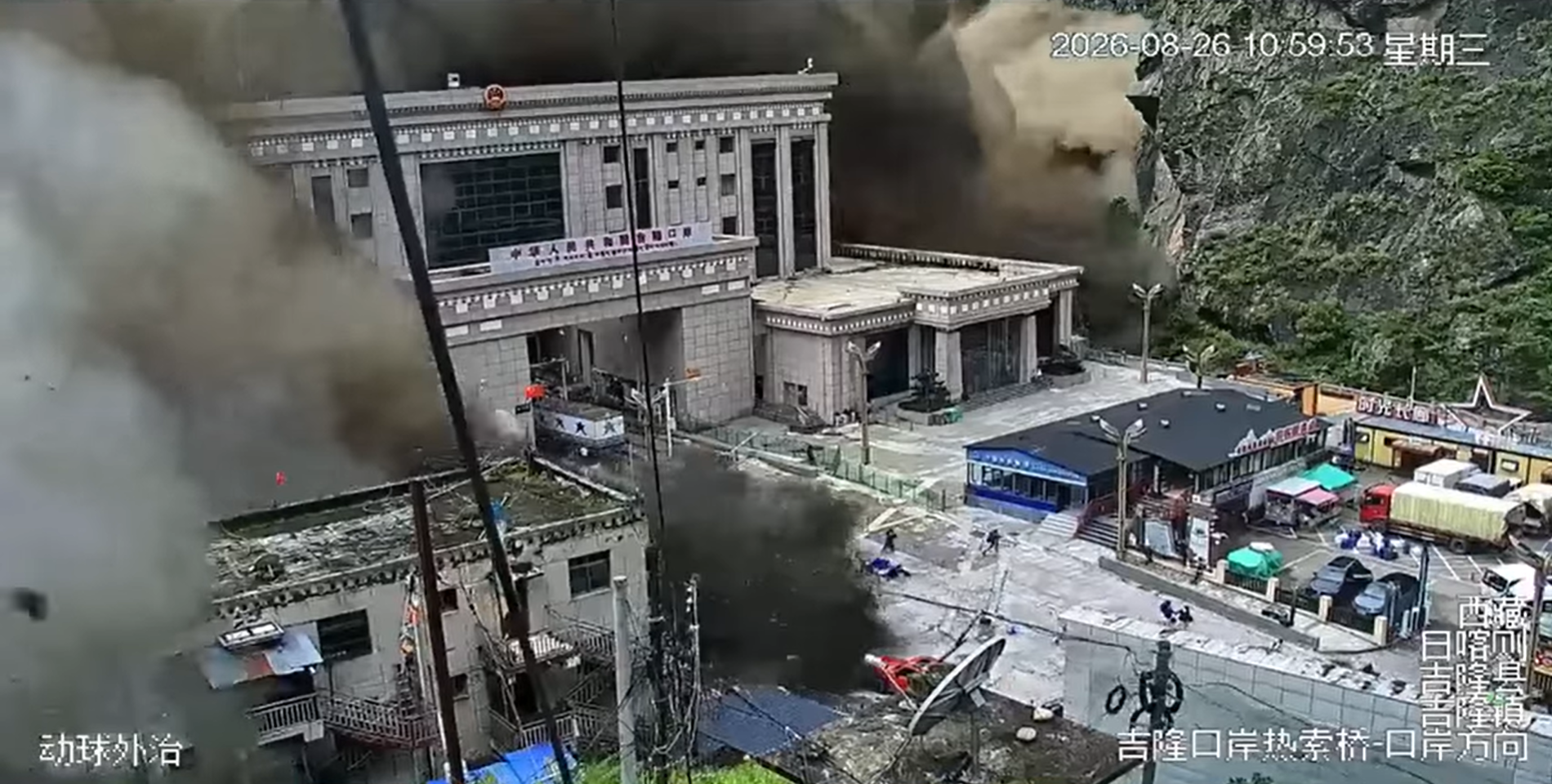
Severe flooding hitting the Gyirong Port crossing on the China–Nepal border on August 26

Procession of King of Norway Harald V's coffin following his death on August 28

The Nancy Grace Roman Space Telescope, launched on August 30

- August 2 – Poland wins the 2026 FIVB Men's Volleyball Nations League, held in Ningbo, China, defeating the United States 3–2 in the final.
- August 7 – Saudi Arabia, Pakistan and Turkey sign the Mecca Defence Alliance, a mutual defence pact, amid the 2026 Iran war.
- August 10 – A powerful magnitude 7.4 earthquake strikes Colombia, killing 335 and injuring over 1,248 people.
- August 11
  - Prosecution of Syrian civil war criminals: A court in Damascus sentences nine Syrian former officials, including ousted president Bashar al-Assad; his brother Maher; his defense minister Fahd Jassem al-Freij; and Atef Najib, former head of the Political Security Directorate in Daraa and Assad's first cousin, to death for premeditated murder, torture and crimes against humanity committed during the Syrian civil war. Except for Najib, all the others were tried in absentia.
  - A ferry capsizing on Lake Kariba, Zimbabwe, kills at least 97 people, becoming the deadliest boat disaster in the country's history.
- August 12 – A total solar eclipse occurs in parts of Europe, the first in continental Europe since 1999.
- August 13 – 2026 Zambian general election: Incumbent President Hakainde Hichilema wins reelection, and the UPND wins a majority in the National Assembly.
- August 15 – At least 142 people are killed and nearly 1,300 injured when a magnitude 7.8 earthquake strikes off the island of Flores, Indonesia.
- August 16 – 12 people are killed, and 47 are injured after a Polish bus, carrying pilgrims from Medjugorje back to Poland, crash near Mezőkeresztes in Hungary.
- August 18 – 2026 Zamboye mine collapse: More than 100 people are killed in a landslide at an artisanal gold mining site in Zamboye, Nana-Mambéré, Central African Republic, near the border with Cameroon.
- August 20
  - 2026 Iran war: U.S. President Donald Trump announces an "Economic D-Day" against Iran, calling on allies to join efforts to isolate Iran economically.
  - Rojava Revolution: The Syrian Democratic Forces announces its integration into the Syrian Army, resulting in the dissolution of the Democratic Autonomous Administration of North and East Syria in favor of the Syrian government under Ahmed al-Sharaa.
- August 23 – 2026 Kazakh legislative election: Pro-Tokayev party Ädilet wins a supermajority in the newly established Kurultai.
- August 24 – Aftermath of the Syrian civil war: The US removes Syria and Hay'at Tahrir al-Sham from its list of designated state sponsors of terrorism, lifting restrictions on foreign investments in the country and allowing services like VISA to work in Syria. Syria has been on the list since 1979.
- August 26
  - At least 12 are killed and 56 injured, when over 150 wildfires break out in Algeria, prompting calls from the president to reintroduce capital punishment for convicted arsonists, which has not been practiced in the country since 1993.
  - 2026 Nepal–Tibet floods: At least 1,403 people are killed and 6,650 are reported missing after a landslide and glacial collapse trigger flash floods and debris flows at the border between Nepal and the Tibet Autonomous Region of China.
- August 28 – King Harald V of Norway dies and is succeeded by his son, King Haakon VIII.
- August 29
  - 2026 Icelandic European Union membership negotiations referendum: A referendum to continue negotiations for Iceland to join the European Union is rejected.
  - 2026 Nigerien coup attempt: A mutinous faction of the Niger Armed Forces called the Armed Forces for the Restoration of the Fatherland attempt a coup against president Abdourahamane Tiani.
- August 30 – NASA launches the flagship Nancy Grace Roman Space Telescope aboard a SpaceX Falcon Heavy rocket. Designed to study dark energy, dark matter and exoplanets, the observatory has a field of view at least 100 times larger than the Hubble Space Telescope's.

=== September ===
MV June Aster after the fire that killed at least 76 people off Coron, Palawan, Philippines, on September 9

Smoke rising from the East-West Pipeline in Saudi Arabia following an attack on September 10

KM Virgo Transport 8 before its sinking in the Java Sea on September 13

Leopardus tilcayo, reported as the first feline species formally identified in over a century on September 17

U.S. president Donald Trump, Danish prime minister Mette Frederiksen, and Greenlandic prime minister Jens-Frederik Nielsen signing a Greenland defense agreement on September 22

Flooding near Lak Si station, Bangkok, Thailand, on September 27

- September 2 – The 2026 Estonian presidential election: Ülle Madise is elected president of Estonia by the Riigikogu.
- September 3 – 2026 Yemen offensives: The Houthis launch a large ground offensive against the internationally recognized Yemeni government forces, ending the ceasefire and resuming the civil war.
- September 4 – The United Nations votes to adopt a resolution which calls for wider use of the Equal Earth projection over the Mercator projection to better reflect the true size of equatorial regions such as Africa.
- September 4–13 – The 2026 FIBA Women's Basketball World Cup is held in Berlin, Germany, and is won by the United States.
- September 5–27 – The 2026 FIFA U-20 Women's World Cup is held in Łódź, Katowice, Sosnowiec and Bielsko-Biała, Poland, and is won by Spain.
- September 8
  - Twelve countries, including Canada, France and the United Kingdom, announce plans to introduce or support trade restrictions on goods from Israeli settlements, citing threats to a two-state solution.
  - The Eighty-First session of the United Nations General Assembly opens in New York.
- September 9 – A fire on the ferry MV June Aster kills at least 76 people and 13 others go missing off Coron, Palawan, Philippines.
- September 10 – 2026 Yemen offensives: The Houthis make significant advancements along Yemen's Red Sea coast, taking control of the city of Mokha and the strategic Bab al-Mandeb strait, leading to a shipping crisis.
- September 10–11 – 2026 Iran war: Saudi Arabia temporarily shuts down the East-West Pipeline following damage sustained from drone strikes launched from Iraqi territory.
- September 13
  - 2026 Swedish general election: The left-wing bloc led by former Prime Minister and Social Democratic leader Magdalena Andersson narrowly wins a majority in the Riksdag.
  - Indonesian ferry KM Virgo Transport 8 sinks in the Java Sea, killing 64 and leaving 71 missing.
- September 14 – The United States publicly acknowledges for the first time that it has deployed "space control weapons" in Earth orbit, with Air Force Secretary Troy Meink confirming that the United States Space Force possesses orbital weapons capable of offensive and defensive operations.
- September 16 – Former president and prime minister of Kosovo Hashim Thaçi is sentenced to 25 years in prison for war crimes during his command of the Kosovo Liberation Army, including the murder of 96 people and the torture of 303 people in the Kosovo War.
- September 17
  - Leopardus tilcayo, a wild cat native to Bolivia, is reported as the first new feline species formally identified since 1923.
  - 2026 French civil unrest: A series of student-led protests begin in Paris with students demanding better funding and resources for schools. In October these protests spread across France, with hundreds of thousands taking part and thousands arrested. The protests spread to multiple countries in Europe, taking on cost of living themes.
- September 18 – Following months of threats by U.S. President Donald Trump to acquire or annex Greenland, an agreement is announced by Denmark, Greenland and the United States to strengthen security in the Arctic and North Atlantic, expanding the permanent U.S. military presence in Greenland while recognizing Danish sovereignty and Greenlandic self-determination. The agreement is formally signed on September 22.
- September 18–20 – 2026 Russian legislative election: The ruling United Russia led by Dmitry Medvedev and supported by president Vladimir Putin maintains parliamentary majority in a sham election which saw no significant competition. Western media outlets criticize the election as being rigged or interfered with.
- September 19–October 4 – The 2026 Asian Games are held around Aichi Prefecture in Japan.
- September 23
  - 2026 Moroccan general election: The Authenticity and Modernity Party led by Fatima Ezzahra El Mansouri wins the most seats in the House of Representatives. Fatima Ezzahra El Mansouri becomes Morocco's first female prime minister.
  - 2026 Ethiopian offensive: The Tigray People’s Liberation Front and groups aligned with them launch a military offensive in northern Ethiopia against the Ethiopian Government, resuming the civil conflict.
- September 24–30 – 2026 Bangkok floods: At least 40 are killed during flooding in Bangkok, Thailand.
- September 25 – 41 people die when a boat sinks in Lake Tanganyika in the Democratic Republic of the Congo.
- September 25–27 – Flash flooding and landslides kill at least 56 people in India and at least 14 people in Nepal. For Nepal this occurs one month on from devastating floods.
- September 27 – 2026 São Toméan parliamentary election: The MLSTP–PSD led by Américo Barros wins the most seats in the National Assembly.
- September 28 – SpaceX Starship becomes the largest vehicle to date to reach Low Earth Orbit, deploying the first 26 functional Starlink V3 satellites.

=== October ===
Major housing protests take place in Madrid on October 8

CCTV footage of the missile strike on King Khalid International Airport on October 10

A firefighter in Paris extinguishing a burning car during riots on October 17

Wikimedia's Phabricator instance as seen hours before the PHP2Shell patch on October 21, disabled as a precaution

CCTV footage of the Karak church shooters entering the building on October 23

Luiz Inácio Lula da Silva after being reelected for a fourth term as President of Brazil on October 25

Memorial candles and flowers in the Seville–Santa Justa railway station following a train crash in Toledo on October 28

- October 2 – G7 leaders hold an emergency meeting to discuss global diesel supplies and agree to release 100 million barrels of oil, as prices surge to record highs amid disruption from the 2026 Iran war.
- October 3 – 2026 Latvian parliamentary election: Incumbent Prime Minister Andris Kulbergs's United List wins a plurality of seats in the Saeima.
- October 4 – The 2026 Bosnian general election is held.
- October 5 – 2026 Yemen offensives: Turkey, Pakistan and Saudi Arabia agree to activate the Mecca Defence Alliance in response to Houthi attacks on Saudi Arabia.
- October 6 – 2026 Kosovan presidential election: The Assembly of Kosovo elects Justina Shiroka Pula as the new President of Kosovo, ending the 2025–2026 political deadlock.
- October 6–21 – 2026 Yemen offensives: At least 20 people are killed and more than 350 others are injured in a series of attacks on airports perpetrated by the Houthis in Riyadh, Abha and Dammam, Saudi Arabia.
- October 8–9 – 2026 Djibouti migrant boat sinking: At least 139 people die and 84 remain missing when a migrant boat travelling to Yemen sinks off of Djibouti.
- October 11 – 2026 French supermarket refrigerator hack: A major cyberattack targets refrigeration units in hundreds of French supermarkets, raising the temperature to 50 °C (122.0 °F). The hack results in fires and tens of millions of euros worth of losses from food spoilage. It is the first cyberattack to cause major disruption to a nation's food supply chain. Similar attacks are carried out in other European countries the following month. France later accuses Iran of conducting the cyberattack.
- October 13 – An early bronze age shipwreck off the coast of Turkey which dates between 2400–2700 BC is reported as the world's oldest shipwreck.
- October 15
  - 2026 Peshawar school roof collapse: The roof of a private school in Peshawar, Khyber Pakhtunkhwa, Pakistan, collapses, killing 35 people and injuring more than 50.
  - At the General Conference on Weights and Measures, the International Bureau of Weights and Measures votes to abolish future leap seconds and make Coordinated Universal Time (UTC) continuous, starting 20 May 2027. To account for future differences between UTC and International Atomic Time, a leap hour will be observed as needed.
- October 19
  - Andorra and San Marino each sign an association agreement with the European Union.
  - Sudanese civil war: A drone attack on a market in the disputed Abyei region kills at least 220 people.
- October 20 – PHP2Shell: Information about two critical vulnerabilities in PHP, a programming language used by most of the World Wide Web, is leaked online, prompting an emergency security announcement. Websites around the world are temporarily taken offline as a precaution, while governments issue cybersecurity warnings and developers release patches.
- October 21 – El Salvador launches a military intervention in Haiti following the kidnapping of four Salvadoran technicians serving with the Gang Suppression Force (GSF) in an ambush.
- October 23 – A mass shooting occurs near Karak, Jordan at a Greek Orthodox Church, killing nine people and injuring 34.
- October 24 – The Junior Eurovision Song Contest 2026 is held in Attard, Malta. Armenia wins their third contest with the song "Boo!" by Naré.
- October 25
  - 2026 Brazilian general election: Incumbent president Luiz Inácio Lula da Silva defeats senator Flávio Bolsonaro in the second round in an upset victory, becoming the first president in Brazilian history to be re-elected to a fourth term and the first to win a second round after losing a first round. Right-leaning parties win majorities in the Chamber of Deputies and the Federal Senate.
  - 2026 Serbian parliamentary election: Following mass student protests, the Student List wins a majority in the National Assembly, defeating former president Aleksandar Vučić's United Serbia.
- October 27 – 2026 Israeli legislative election: The governing coalition led by Likud leader and incumbent Prime Minister Benjamin Netanyahu loses its majority in the Knesset. The opposition bloc led by Yashar leader Gadi Eisenkot makes gains, but also fails to reach a majority.
- October 28 – At least 69 people are killed and hundreds injured when two high-speed trains collide in Los Yébenes, Toledo, Spain.
- October 30
  - Binance, the world's largest cryptocurrency exchange, is hacked and approximately 6.3 billion USD is stolen in the largest heist of its kind in history.
  - Polish Constitutional Tribunal crisis: The president of the Polish Constitutional Tribunal, Bogdan Święczkowski, and vice-president Bartłomiej Sochański, are suspended for a month by judge Anna Korwin-Piotrowska, causing protests and resulting in President Karol Nawrocki breaking into the Constitutional Tribunal building.
- October 31–November 13 – The 2026 Summer Youth Olympics are held in Dakar, Senegal.

=== November ===
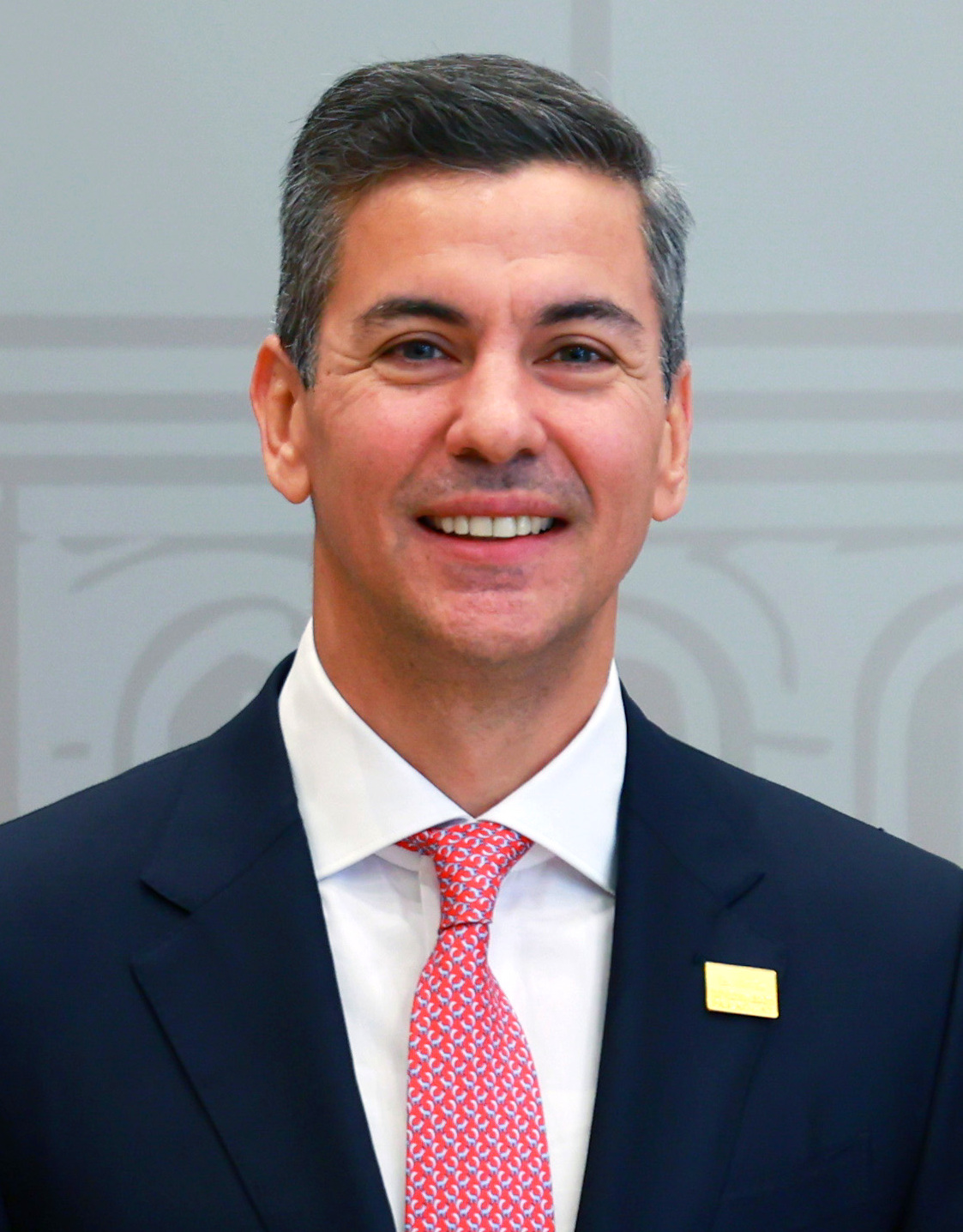
President of Paraguay Santiago Peña, removed from office after an impeachment and subsequent arrest on November 6 due to a banking crisis involving Ueno Bank

Memorial candles lit at the site of the November 7 shooting in Kraków

Nvidia CEO Jensen Huang, who resigned amidst public revelation of multiple extramarital affairs, including one involving an alleged Chinese spy

The space probe Voyager 1, which became the first human-made object to reach a distance of one light-day from Earth on November 18

Advertising of Grand Theft Auto VI, released on November 19

- November 1 – 2026 Bulgarian presidential election: Incumbent president Iliana Iotova is elected to a full term following Rumen Radev's resignation, defeating former acting Prime Minister Andrey Gurov in both rounds.
- November 3 – 2026 United States elections: In a blue wave, the Democratic Party wins majorities in both the House of Representatives and the Senate.
- November 5 – 2026 Grenadian general election: The National Democratic Congress led by incumbent Prime Minister Dickon Mitchell wins a landslide victory, winning 14 out of 15 seats in the House of Representatives.
- November 6 – 2026 Paraguay banking crisis: Paraguayan president Santiago Peña is unanimously removed from office by the Senate over alleged conflicts of interest involving Ueno Bank, whose accounts were frozen by the central bank. He is succeeded by Vice President Pedro Alliana.
- November 6–21 – The inaugural Nations Championship – Northern Hemisphere Series – is held.
- November 7
  - 2026 New Zealand general election: A close race between the incumbent National-led coalition and the Labour-led opposition produces no clear winner. Weeks of coalition talks are expected.
  - 2026 Kraków shooting: Seven people (including the perpetrator) die and 15 are injured when a gunman shoots from a car at passers-by in the Main Square of Kraków, Poland. Three other victims are found dead at the perpetrator's house.
- November 12 – Nvidia CEO Jensen Huang resigns amidst an affair involving an alleged Chinese spy.
- November 12–14 – 2026 Microsoft outage: A global outage disrupts Microsoft 365 services, including Outlook, Teams and Copilot, affecting businesses and government agencies worldwide.
- November 14
  - The inaugural Eurovision Song Contest Asia is held in Bangkok, Thailand.
  - After a 22-hour orbital test flight, SpaceX successfully recovers its Starship vehicle with mechanical launch-tower arms at Starbase in Texas, marking the first-ever recovery of an orbital upper-stage spacecraft.
- November 15 – 2026 Cape Verdean presidential election: Incumbent president José Maria Neves wins reelection against Joana Rosa.
- November 15–17 – The 2026 ASEAN Summit is held in the Philippines.
- November 17 – Mongolian president Ukhnaagiin Khürelsükh announces his resignation from office amid allegations of corruption.
- November 18 – NASA's Voyager 1 becomes the first human-made object to travel one light-day from Earth.
- November 18–19 – The APEC Economic Leaders' Meeting 2026 is held in China.
- November 19
  - Rockstar Games releases Grand Theft Auto VI, the first new main installment in the Grand Theft Auto series since 2013. Pre-orders and first-day sales total an estimated 24.5 million copies and US$2.36 billion, making it the biggest entertainment launch in history.
  - Rohingya genocide case: The International Court of Justice (ICJ) finds that Myanmar committed genocide against its Rohingya minority population, marking the first time a state has ever been found guilty by an international court of committing genocide.
- November 20 – An AI-assisted proof of the 167-year-old Riemann hypothesis, one of the most famous problems in mathematics, is published and formalized in Lean. The proof is accepted by the Lean community the following day.
- November 22 – COP31 concludes in Antalya, Turkey, without an overarching agreement after participating countries fail to reach consensus. The main dispute centres on the omission of any reference to transitioning away from fossil fuels in the proposed final declaration.

== Scheduled events ==
- November 27–29: The inaugural Nations Championship Finals will take place at Twickenham Stadium in London. The Nations Championship trophy will be contested by France vs. South Africa.
- November 29 – The 2026 Spanish general election is scheduled to be held. The election was called early in response to nationwide protests over affordable housing.
- December 3–20 – The 2026 European Women's Handball Championship is scheduled to be held in the Czech Republic, Poland, Romania, Slovakia and Turkey.
- December 5 – The 2026 Gambian presidential election is scheduled to be held.
- December 6 – The Abu Dhabi Grand Prix is scheduled to be held, marking the end of the 2026 Formula One World Championship.
- December 27 – If not triggered earlier, the 2026 Serbian presidential election must be held no later than this date.

== Nobel Prizes ==
Nobel medal

- Chemistry – Henri B. Kagan and Kensō Soai, for the discovery of non-linear effects and autocatalysis in asymmetric organic synthesis.
- Economics – Robert E. Hall and Michael Woodford, for microeconomic foundations of macroeconomic stabilisation.
- Literature – Anne Carson, for her bold and inventive oeuvre that, in playful dialogue with the classical tradition, has created new forms for contemporary literature.
- Peace – Navi Pillay, for her efforts to promote peace and international law.
- Physics – Francis Halzen, for decisive contributions to the IceCube Neutrino Observatory and the discovery of high-energy neutrinos of astrophysical origin.
- Physiology or Medicine – Karl Deisseroth, Peter Hegemann and Georg Nagel, for their discoveries concerning light-gated ion channels and optogenetics.

== See also ==
- Deaths in 2026
- 2026 timelines
  - Timeline of the Anglophone Crisis (2026)
  - Timeline of the Islamic State (2026)
  - Timeline of the Israeli–Palestinian conflict in 2026
  - Timeline of the 2026 Iran war
  - Timeline of the Sudanese civil war (2026)
  - Timeline of the second Trump presidency (2026 Q1, 2026 Q2, 2026 Q3, 2026 Q4)
