= MV June Aster ship fire =

2026 Philippine maritime disaster in Coron

- MV June Aster on fire

Details
- Date: September 9, 2026
- Location: Off the coast of Coron, Palawan, Philippines
- Coordinates: 12.026°N 120.347°E

Statistics
- Passengers: 128
- Crew: 17
- Deaths: 77
- Missing: 8

On the evening of September 9, 2026, the Philippine passenger-cargo vessel MV June Aster caught fire in the waters off Coron, Palawan. The ferry was carrying 128 passengers and 17 crew members when the fire broke out. The fire was reported at around 6:45 p.m. PHT (UTC+8) approximately 1.2 nautical miles (2.2 km; 1.4 mi) northeast of Barangay Marcilla in Coron. At least 77 people on board were killed, while 43 were rescued and 8 remain missing.

== Background ==
The June Aster is a passenger-cargo vessel operated by Atienza Interisland Ferries Inc., a Philippine shipping company. It passed a safety check conducted by the Philippine Coast Guard (PCG) in March 2026. At the time, the Filipino Maritime Industry Authority (MARINA) recorded that the June Aster had a gross tonnage of 490.49, a capacity of 277 passengers and 21 crew, and was built in 2002.

Before the fire, the vessel was used on the Manila–Coron–El Nido, Batangas–Puerto Galera and Batangas–Coron routes. In September 2025, it ran aground off Puerto Galera, Oriental Mindoro during a typhoon, requiring the rescue of its 16 crew.

Coron is an island municipality in the northern part of Palawan and is part of the Calamian Islands, together with Busuanga, Culion and Linapacan. Coron is also a tourist destination known for beaches and diving sites featuring World War II shipwrecks.

== Incident ==
The MV June Aster after the fire, side view (top); aerial view (bottom)

The June Aster departed Manila on the evening of September 8, 2026, and was expected to arrive in Coron the next evening. On the evening of September 9, the ship caught fire in the waters off Coron. The PCG said the ferry was approximately 1.2 nautical miles northeast of Barangay Marcilla when the incident occurred. The fire was reported at around 6:45 p.m. PHT. The vessel had 128 passengers and 17 crew members aboard. This figure excludes 4 listed passengers who were later confirmed to not be aboard the ship. Its cargo included five motorcycles, a car, a forklift, and a pick-up truck. The vessel had departed from Baseco in Manila and was bound for Coron when the fire broke out.

The PCG responded after receiving a report of the burning vessel. Other ships in the area, the Coast Guard Sub-Station in Turda, the Coron Municipal Disaster Risk Reduction and Management Office, and local fishermen also assisted in the response. Video released by the Philippine Coast Guard showed the ferry engulfed in flames. Authorities had not determined the cause of the fire as of September 10. Due to strong currents, the ship's position shifted by some 3.68 nautical miles from its initial location before running aground. Due to the flames, the PCG was unable to board the ship until the fire was put out on the morning of September 11.

== Emergency response ==
PCG Airbus H145 helicopter arriving to assist the retrieval operations

The PCG led the search and rescue operation following the fire. Other vessels, the Coast Guard Sub-Station Turda, the Coron Municipal Disaster Risk Reduction and Management Office and local fishermen took part in the response. Forty-two people were rescued from the vessel and brought to the covered court in Barangay Turda. Five people were reported dead, while authorities continued searching for people who were still unaccounted for. On September 10, the number of people rescued increased to forty-three. Thirteen crew members were also rescued. Some survivors were not wearing life vests during the incident.

Two people initially listed as missing were later found to have missed the ship's departure, putting the initial number of unaccounted at eighty-four. Among the passengers were two Chilean nationals who survived. Atienza Shipping said four crew members were missing, while the ship's captain, identified as Roel Sarmiento, survived, but did not make contact with authorities until September 14. This reduced the number of missing to twelve. On September 16, the number of missing was reduced to eight after it was found that four people listed on the manifest did not board the vessel at all. The PCG later expanded search operations to the southwestern part of Occidental Mindoro.

Transporting the recovered bodies

The rescued passengers were brought to local medical facilities. Seven of the survivors were taken to a hospital in Culion, a neighboring island, for medical treatment. The search and rescue operation continued under the direction of the PCG.

Atienza Shipping Lines deployed another of its vessels, MV October Lavender, to transport relatives of the missing to Coron.

=== Casualties ===
After the fire was put out, at least 30 bodies were recovered from the vessel on September 11. The next day, the remains of 41 victims and one dog were recovered, raising the death toll to 76. Authorities prepared temporary graves to store bodies until they could be identified. The bodies of the 71 people recovered from the ship were described as "totally charred" and required DNA identification. On September 15, an injured crew member succumbed to burn injuries at the Culion Sanitarium and General Hospital, raising the death toll to 77. At least one of the fatalities was a child.

The Philippine National Police processed the remains at a makeshift laboratory set up in Borac Port. A coffin was also recovered, which contained the remains of a person who died in Manila and was being transported back home to Coron. The Maritime Industry Authority (MARINA) said injured survivors would receive P50,000 each in compensation, while relatives of the deceased would receive P250,000 for each victim.

== Investigation ==
Burnt motorcycles and a car at the cargo hull of MV June Aster.

Authorities had not determined the cause of the fire as of September 10, 2026. Preliminary interviews with survivors indicated that the fire started in the cargo hold, according to the PCG. Survivors said the fire was preceded by a loud explosion that immediately shut off the ship's electricity and generated smoke before the flames rapidly spread.

In a statement, the ship's captain said he had been alerted to the fire by a crew member and ordered passengers to be brought into the bridge and for the crew to prepare firefighting equipment. He said he was unable to warn the passengers after a power outage disabled the ship's VHF and public address system. The fire began to rapidly spread, prompting him to order the deployment of life rafts. He then jumped into the water before making his way to a nearby raft, after which he and other passengers were rescued.

The investigators are looking into the possibility that the fire is related to the electric vehicle aboard the ferry. In late September, the MARINA said the fire may have originated from an unspecified flammable cargo that had been improperly stored inside the vessel.

On November 11, 2026, the Bureau of Fire Protection (BFP) filed criminal complaints alleging reckless imprudence resulting in multiple homicide, multiple physical injuries and damage to property against 16 individuals over the fire, including the ship's captain, three officials and employees of Atienza Shipping, three officials and employees of Mega Lifters Cargo Handling Corp., a third-party contractor of the Philippine Ports Authority, and four PCG personnel who authorized the ship's departure. It added that the fire started following a chemical reaction involving calcium hypochlorite that had been improperly stored beside cooking oil and asphalt blocks that were all placed at the rear of the cargo deck, directly in front of the ship's hot air exhaust outlet.

== Impact ==
Other ferry operators such as Montenegro Lines and Island Water has restricted the boarding of electric vehicles on its ships as a response to the fire.

The Department of Energy issued a statement on September 17 that is recognizes safety concerns related to the transport of EVs on ships and is coordinating with the MARINA on developing EV-related safety guidelines. The MARINA has no prevailing guidelines on the transport of EVs.

== See also ==
- List of maritime disasters in the Philippines
- MV Doña Paz, a Philippine passenger ferry that collided with the oil tanker MT Vector in December 1987 and caught fire, causing the deadliest peacetime maritime disaster in history
