= Sinking of the Virgo Transport 8 =

2026 ferry maritime disaster in Indonesia

- KM Virgo Transport 8 in service on the Surabaya–Banjarmasin route

Details
- Date: 13 September 2026 c. 2:00 am (WITA; UTC+8)
- Location: Java Sea
- Coordinates: 4°31′51.82″S 114°2′6.88″E
- Country: Indonesia
- Owner: PT Virgo Karya Shipping
- Cause: Under investigation

Statistics
- Vehicles: KM Virgo Transport 8
- Passengers: 213
- Crew: 30
- Deaths: 80
- Missing: 55
- Property: 89 vehicles

On 13 September 2026, the Indonesian-flagged ferry Virgo Transport 8 capsized and sank in the Java Sea. The ferry was travelling from Surabaya, East Java to Banjarmasin, South Kalimantan, carrying 243 people and 89 vehicles. The sinking has resulted in at least 80 deaths, while 55 people remain missing.

The ferry departed Surabaya on 12 September. While travelling across the Java Sea, the ferry encountered rough weather and high waves. On 13 September at approximately 2:00 am WITA (UTC+8), the ship's captain reported that the ship was listing; this was the last communication from the vessel before contact was lost. The Banjarmasin Search and Rescue Office (part of the Indonesian National Search and Rescue Agency) received a missing vessel report at 4:10 am from Yoel Rihi, the general manager of PT Virgo Karya Shipping, the ship's operator. At 4:30 am, the rescue vessel KN SAR Laksmana 241 was dispatched to the ship's last estimated position; around 80 nautical miles (150 km; 92 mi) from the Basirih Search and Rescue (SAR) dock in Banjarmasin.

== Background ==
- The ship while operating as Ferry Kurushima in Japan in 2014

History

Japan
- Name: Ferry Kurushima
- Owner: Matsuyama-Kokura Ferry
- Operator: Matsuyama-Kokura Ferry
- Route: Matsuyama Kokura
- Builder: Shin Kurushima Dockyard (Onishi, Aichi)
- In service: 1987–2025
- Out of service: 1 July 2025
- Fate: Sold to Virgo Karya Shipping

History

Indonesia
- Name: Virgo Transport 8
- Operator: PT Virgo Karya Shipping
- In service: 2025–2026
- Identification: IMO number: 8625179
- Fate: Sank, 13 September 2026

The ship, originally named Ferry Kurushima, was built in 1987 at the Shin Kurushima Onishi shipyard in Japan. It has been owned since 2025 by PT Virgo Karya Shipping and is assigned IMO number 8625179. The ship is 119 m (390 ft) long and has a gross tonnage of 4,277.

== Incident ==
The ship was undertaking a scheduled ferry route from Surabaya to Banjarmasin, on the return leg of its journey. The ship departed Surabaya at 10:13 am WIB on 12 September and was scheduled to arrive at 7:00 am on 13 September at the Trisakti Port in Banjarmasin. Around midnight on 12 September, the ship's captain reported rough weather conditions to the ship's agent. The last transmission was received around 2:00 am on 13 September, with the captain reporting that the ship was listing. After this, communications were lost. Yoel Rihi, the general manager of PT Virgo, filed a report with Basarnas, Indonesia's national rescue agency, at 4:10 am.

== Search and rescue ==
After receiving the report, the SAR Banjarmasin mobilised a team from its office towards the SAR Basirih pier. At 4:30 am, the team departed on the vessel KN SAR Laksmana 241 and were estimated to need five hours to reach the vessel's last reported location. Along with the vessel, a helicopter was deployed by SAR Surabaya from the Juanda Naval Air Base to assist with aerial search efforts.

Three commercial vessels, TB TCP, MV Haida (Aida), and TB Mauhau 9 were in the vicinity of the ship's reported coordinates. They proceeded to rescue 38, 49, and 15 survivors respectively; with TB Mauhau 9 recovering one person who had died. The Basarnas rescuers then located the ship 80 nautical miles from Banjarmasin, finding that it was partially submerged and lay capsized. On 15 September, 22 survivors were brought to a harbour in Banjarmasin, along with 4 airlifted bodies.

Sea conditions have been reported to be difficult at the search area, with waves of up to 2.5 metres (8.2 ft) hampering search and rescue operations. On 14 September, it was reported that the government had deployed 622 rescue personnel to the site, along with 17 ships and 5 helicopters. Strong winds and waves were said to have prevented rescuers from boarding the ship or performing underwater searches. By 15 September, the ship had sunk to a depth of 30 m (98 ft).

On 16 September, divers from the Indonesian Navy were stopped from accessing the vessel by strong currents. The rescuers subsequently announced that they planned to right the ship, search for survivors, and then tow it away for investigation. The vessel was reported to have shifted 450 metres (1,480 ft) from its original position.

The chief of Basarnas, Mohammad Syafii, said on 17 September that the responsibility for recovering and removing the wreck lies with the owner due to the provisions of Law No. 17 of 2008, and that they still believed there were survivors trapped inside the overturned ship. On 18 September, PT Virgo said that they had all the equipment ready to upright the ship, and that the lifting operation could begin within 1–2 days provided that the weather conditions permitted to do so.

On 18 September, divers were able to access the ship after currents dropped down to 2 knots.

On 3 October, Basarnas announced that it had ended underwater diving operations, due to the instability of the wreck and the deteriorated conditions of the bodies inside the hull. The next day, PT Virgo's spokesperson Simson Rihi said that the salvage operation would take place in October. He added that the company had selected a contractor to conduct the salvage operation, while the company was providing supporting documents to Protection and indemnity (P&I) insurers before the arrangement is finalised. The operation was also said to have received approval from the Ministry of Transportation and Basarnas.

== Investigation ==
On 14 September, the National Transportation Safety Committee (NTSC) began collecting technical data on the vessel and the incident. Syafii said that survivors’ statements were being submitted to the NTSC as evidence. He also indicated that the search and rescue (SAR) operation could be extended if reliable information were obtained regarding the location of additional victims.

The Minister of Transport, Dudy Purwagandhi said that the vessel had a capacity of 500 passengers and thus was not overloaded at the time of the incident. He stressed that the investigation was ongoing, and that people should wait for its findings.

The criminal investigation was transferred on 28 September, from the South Kalimantan regional police to the Indonesian National Police's water-and-air directorate.

On 30 September, the police announced that the Captain Arief Yunianto had been named as a suspect and was subsequently detained at the South Kalimantan Regional Police headquarters. A week later, on 8 October, it was announced that three people associated with the company had been detained at the same location, on allegations of "negligence, complicity, or aiding and abetting related to the occurrence of the ship accident.”

== Reactions ==
President Prabowo Subianto, during an event to inaugurate the Kelapa Gading–Manggarai line of the Jakarta LRT, said that Indonesians should remember "our brothers and sisters who suffered this tragedy" while saying that they would "continue to conduct an investigation, to find out the cause of this incident, so that in the future we can better mitigate it and take the best possible measures.” He also appreciated the cooperation between different levels of government and agencies, as a symbol of Indonesian unity.

- Malaysia: The Malaysian Embassy in Jakarta expressed its condolences to Indonesia, through its interim chargé d’affaires Farzamie Zarkawi. Zarkawi extended his sympathy to the families of those affected by the incident and hoped that "all search and rescue efforts currently underway will be facilitated by Allah SWT."
- Saudi Arabia: Salman bin Abdulaziz Al Saud, the king, and Mohammed bin Salman, the crown prince of Saudi Arabia sent their condolences to President Prabowo.
- Qatar: The Emir of Qatar, Tamim bin Hamad Al-Thani on 26 September expressed solidarity with those affected and hoped for the speedy recovery of injured victims. Qatar’s Deputy Emir, Abdullah bin Hamad Al-Thani, and Prime Minister Mohammed bin Abdulrahman bin Jassim Al-Thani also sent condolences.
- Oman: Sultan Haitham bin Tariq expressed sympathy to Prabowo as well as the Indonesian people and wished the injured a speedy recovery.

== See also ==
- List of ship accidents and incidents in Indonesia
