= 2026 Peshawar school roof collapse =

School roof collapse in Pakistan

- Date: 15 October 2026
- Time: 8:48 a.m. (UTC+05:00)
- Location: Dir Colony, Peshawar, Khyber Pakhtunkhwa, Pakistan; 33°59′18″N 71°34′46″E
- Type: Structural collapse
- Deaths: 35
- Injuries: 50+

On 15 October 2026, the roof of Al-Khair Education Center in the Dir Colony neighborhood of Peshawar, Khyber Pakhtunkhwa, Pakistan, collapsed, killing 34 children and a teacher and injuring over 50 others. The building was known to be poorly constructed, and heavy rain may have contributed to the collapse.

The building collapse is the deadliest in Pakistan's history.

== Background ==
Al-Khair Education Center is a three-storey private school with more than 1,200 students and staff. The roof that fell was made up of mud and bricks.

Peshawar police chief Mian Saeed noted that the building was weak and overloaded. The area had recently experienced heavy rain, which may have damaged its structural integrity.

Pakistan has a history of building collapses, mainly due to poor safety standards and low-quality construction materials.

== Collapse ==
At 8:48 a.m. Pakistan Standard Time (UTC+05:00), the roof over two classrooms collapsed and fell through two storeys of the school, where about 110 students were attending classes in three classrooms below. The rescue operation lasted four to five hours.

Footage showed rescuers pulling injured children from the rubble and rushing them to ambulances through crowded alleys. An eyewitness, whose niece escaped from the collapse, related between 10 and 15 children were trapped under the rubble, "with debris piled up to their necks".

== Casualties ==
The event resulted in the death of 34 students and a teacher; most of the child casualties were between the ages of 6 and 12 years old. Over 50 others were injured, with three in critical condition; most of them sustained head injuries and were treated at Lady Reading Hospital a few kilometres away.

== Aftermath ==
Following the collapse, the owner of the school was arrested and an investigation has been launched.

In a statement on X, Prime Minister Shehbaz Sharif expressed condolences and ordered the "best possible care" for the injured and an investigation into the disaster. President Asif Ali Zardari described the collapse as a "heartbreaking tragedy".

Khyber Pakhtunkhwa governor Faisal Kundi visited the site, expressing his condolences to the victims' families, assuring accountability and saying that a investigation report would be presented to him within a week. Kundi also demanded for safety inspections of public and private schools across the province.
