= 2026 Djibouti migrant boat sinking =

- Date: 8–9 October 2026
- Location: Gulf of Aden
- Type: Capsizing
- Cause: Overcrowding
- Participants: 305
- Deaths: 139
- Missing: 84

On the night between 8–9 October 2026, a migrant boat capsized near Guhere, north of the city of Obock in Djibouti. The vessel was carrying around 305 passengers, mostly Ethiopian migrants, across the Gulf of Aden to Yemen. Eighty-two people have been rescued from the boat, 139 others have been reported to have died, and a further 84 remain missing.

According to survivor's accounts reported by the United Nations' International Organization for Migration (IOM), the boat sank shortly after leaving the coast. The IOM attributed the sinking primarily due to the ship being heavily overcrowded.

== Background ==
The Eastern Route is a major migration corridor that passes through Eastern Africa. The route begins in Ethiopia, then into either Djibouti or Somalia, from where boats ferry migrants across the Gulf of Aden to Yemen. The migrants may then try to travel onwards to the Gulf countries for either work or safety. Obock is one of the two main departure points for ferries, along with Bosaso in Somalia, which provide the shortest journeys across the Gulf. Between 2024 and 2025, the IOM recorded an 18% increase in outgoing movements along the route. 2025 also proved to be the deadliest year for the route, with 922 deaths and disappearances.

The main reasons for undertaking the journey include unemployment, poverty, drought, food insecurity and conflicts in the Horn of Africa. Gulf states such as Saudi Arabia offer prospects of employment and higher income, due to which migrants are willing to risk the journey across. By early October 2026, it was stated that there were now three movements: migrants heading to Yemen, residents fleeing Yemen to Djibouti and Ethiopian migrants returning back from Yemen. The IOM said that over 4,000 refugees had arrived back to Djibouti over the preceding week. However, the IOM had also reported more than 20,000 journeys from Ethiopia, who were reportedly unaware of the worsening security situation in Yemen.

== Incident ==
The boat was travelling across the Gulf of Aden to Yemen, carrying mostly Ethiopian migrants. Survivors stated that the boat was severely overcrowded and had begun sinking backwards soon after they boarded. Between the nights of 8 and 9 October 2026, the boat capsized near Guhere, north of the city of Obock.

== Search and rescue ==
Djiboutian authorities subsequently started a search-and-rescue operation, recovering multiple bodies that were washed ashore. Eighty-two people were rescued from the boat as of 12 October; all Ethiopian nationals. The rescued were taken to an IOM centre in Obock, where they were given medical care and psychological support.

== Reactions ==
The UNICEF Regional Director for Eastern and Southern Africa Etleva Kadilli offered her condolences to the survivors and the families of the victims. Mahamoud Ali Youssouf, the chairperson of the African Union Commission, expressed his sadness over the deaths of migrants, including children. He called for stronger regional and international cooperation to address the underlying causes of irregular migration.
