= Geography of the Central African Republic =

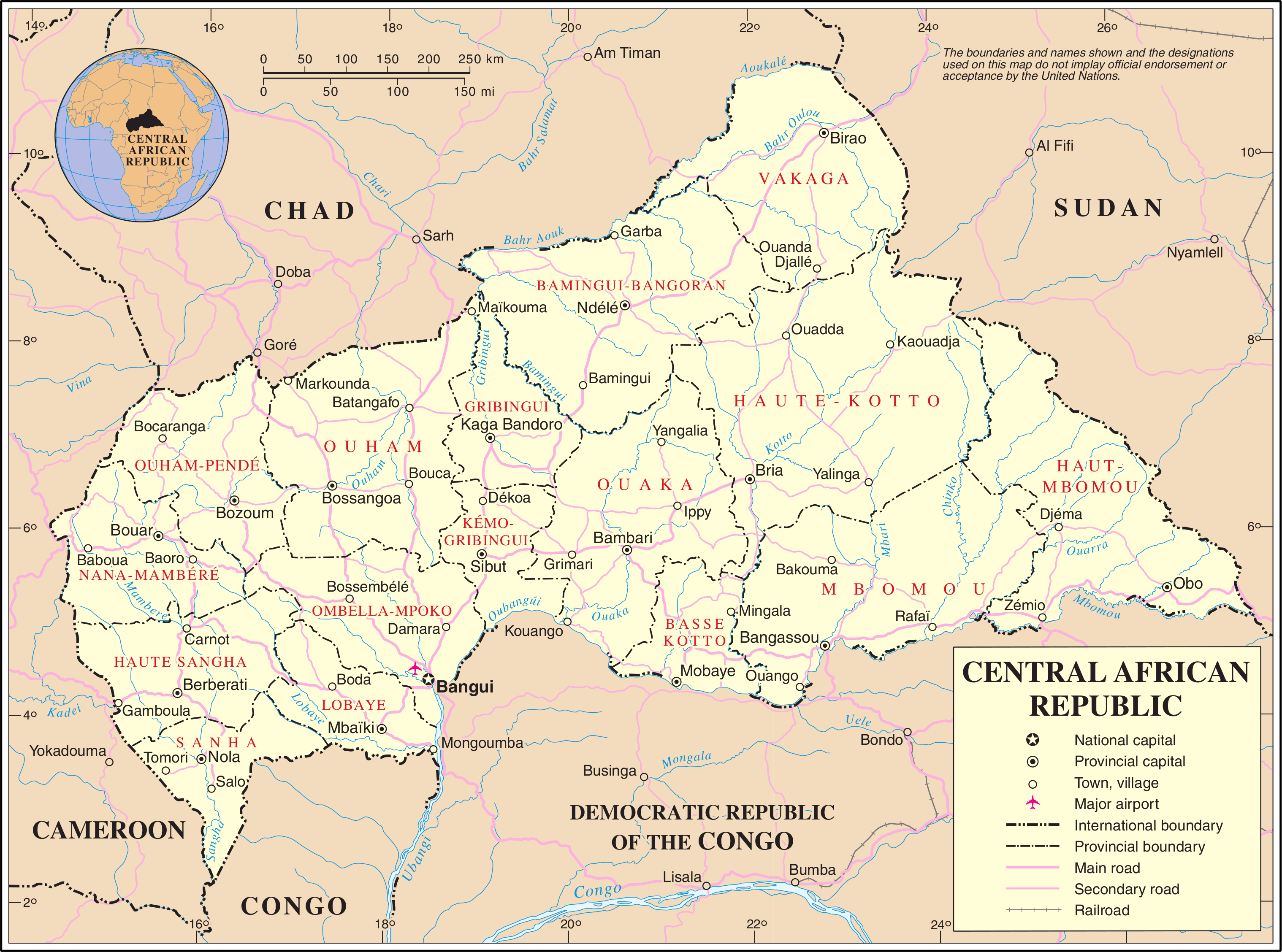
A United Nations map of the Central African Republic

Location of the Central African Republic

The Central African Republic is a landlocked nation within the interior of the African continent. It is bordered by Cameroon, Chad, Sudan, South Sudan, the Democratic Republic of the Congo and the Republic of the Congo. Much of the country consists of flat, or rolling plateau savanna, about 1,640 feet (500 m) above sea level. In the northeast are the Fertit Hills, and there are scattered hills in the southwestern part of the country. To the northwest is the Karre Mountains (also known as Yade Massif), a granite plateau with an altitude of 3,750 feet (1,143 m).

At 622,984 square kilometres (240,535 sq mi), the Central African Republic is the world's 45th-largest country (after Somalia). It is comparable in size to Ukraine.

Much of the southern border is formed by tributaries of the Congo River, with the Mbomou River in the east merging with the Uele River to form the Ubangi River. In the west, the Sangha River flows through part of the country. The eastern border lies along the edge of the Congo-Nile watershed.

In the Central African Republic forest cover is around 36% of the total land area, equivalent to 22,303,000 hectares (86,110 sq mi) of forest in 2020, down from 23,203,000 hectares (89,590 sq mi) in 1990. In 2020, naturally regenerating forest covered 22,301,000 hectares (86,100 sq mi) and planted forest covered 2,000 hectares (7.7 sq mi). Of the naturally regenerating forest 9% was reported to be primary forest (consisting of native tree species with no clearly visible indications of human activity). For the year 2015, 91% of the forest area was reported to be under public ownership and 9% private ownership. In 2021, the rate of deforestation in the Central African Republic increased by 71%. The forest is highly diverse and includes commercially important species of Ayous, Sapele and Sipo.

== Climate ==
Central African Republic map of Köppen climate classification.

The climate of the Central African Republic is generally a tropical savanna climate (Köppen Aw), although there are areas with a tropical monsoon climate (Köppen Am) and in the north there is also a hot semi-arid climate (Köppen BSh). There is a wet season and a dry season, and the temperature is hot throughout the year. The northern areas are subject to harmattan winds, which are hot, dry, and carry dust. The tip of the northern regions have been subject to desertification. The remainder of the country is prone to flooding from nearby rivers. About one third of the Central African Republic's population do not have access to clean water.

Climate data for Bangui (381 metres or 1,250 feet), Central African Republic (1931–1955)
Month	Jan	Feb	Mar	Apr	May	Jun	Jul	Aug	Sep	Oct	Nov	Dec	Year
Record high °C (°F)	37.2 (99.0)	38.8 (101.8)	39.5 (103.1)	38.0 (100.4)	38.6 (101.5)	35.8 (96.4)	34.3 (93.7)	34.4 (93.9)	35.9 (96.6)	35.7 (96.3)	36.7 (98.1)	36.2 (97.2)	39.5 (103.1)
Mean daily maximum °C (°F)	32.9 (91.2)	33.9 (93.0)	33.5 (92.3)	32.9 (91.2)	31.9 (89.4)	30.9 (87.6)	29.9 (85.8)	29.9 (85.8)	30.6 (87.1)	30.7 (87.3)	31.4 (88.5)	31.8 (89.2)	31.7 (89.1)
Daily mean °C (°F)	26.0 (78.8)	27.1 (80.8)	27.4 (81.3)	27.1 (80.8)	26.5 (79.7)	25.3 (77.5)	25.1 (77.2)	25.1 (77.2)	25.4 (77.7)	25.5 (77.9)	25.7 (78.3)	25.7 (78.3)	26.0 (78.8)
Mean daily minimum °C (°F)	19.5 (67.1)	20.2 (68.4)	21.3 (70.3)	21.4 (70.5)	21.1 (70.0)	19.7 (67.5)	20.3 (68.5)	20.3 (68.5)	20.2 (68.4)	20.2 (68.4)	20.0 (68.0)	19.3 (66.7)	20.3 (68.5)
Record low °C (°F)	13.0 (55.4)	13.1 (55.6)	16.2 (61.2)	14.4 (57.9)	16.0 (60.8)	16.5 (61.7)	15.0 (59.0)	17.0 (62.6)	17.2 (63.0)	17.3 (63.1)	16.9 (62.4)	13.8 (56.8)	13.0 (55.4)
Average rainfall mm (inches)	20 (0.8)	39 (1.5)	116 (4.6)	142 (5.6)	167 (6.6)	134 (5.3)	174 (6.9)	240 (9.4)	185 (7.3)	190 (7.5)	89 (3.5)	24 (0.9)	1,520 (59.9)
Average rainy days (≥ 0.1 mm)	2	5	10	12	14	13	14	17	16	17	11	4	135
Average relative humidity (%)	70	64	71	76	79	81	83	83	83	83	81	75	77
Mean monthly sunshine hours	203	201	191	184	193	158	138	138	143	158	171	220	2,098
Source 1: Deutscher Wetterdienst
Source 2: Danish Meteorological Institute (sun only)

Climate data for Bossangoa (2000–2016)
Month	Jan	Feb	Mar	Apr	May	Jun	Jul	Aug	Sep	Oct	Nov	Dec	Year
Mean daily maximum °C (°F)	35.7 (96.3)	37.5 (99.5)	38.3 (100.9)	36.3 (97.3)	34.4 (93.9)	32.4 (90.3)	31.2 (88.2)	30.9 (87.6)	31.5 (88.7)	32.7 (90.9)	34.3 (93.7)	34.9 (94.8)	34.2 (93.5)
Daily mean °C (°F)	25.1 (77.2)	27.9 (82.2)	29.8 (85.6)	29.4 (84.9)	28.5 (83.3)	26.9 (80.4)	26.1 (79.0)	25.9 (78.6)	26.2 (79.2)	26.6 (79.9)	26.7 (80.1)	25.0 (77.0)	27.0 (80.6)
Mean daily minimum °C (°F)	14.3 (57.7)	18.4 (65.1)	21.3 (70.3)	22.5 (72.5)	22.0 (71.6)	21.4 (70.5)	20.9 (69.6)	20.9 (69.6)	20.7 (69.3)	20.6 (69.1)	19.0 (66.2)	15.0 (59.0)	19.8 (67.5)
Average rainfall mm (inches)	1 (0.0)	6 (0.2)	47 (1.9)	92 (3.6)	141 (5.6)	166 (6.5)	234 (9.2)	279 (11.0)	240 (9.4)	159 (6.3)	22 (0.9)	1 (0.0)	1,388 (54.6)
Mean monthly sunshine hours	265	242	211	211	227	188	165	155	172	198	248	266	2,548
Source 1: Normales et records pour la période 2000–2016 à Bossangoa ,
Source 2: Climate Bossangoa – Central African Republic for rainfall totals , Étude méthodologique pour l'utilisation des données climatologiques de l'Afrique tropicale for sunshine hours

Climate data for N'Délé (2002–2013)
Month	Jan	Feb	Mar	Apr	May	Jun	Jul	Aug	Sep	Oct	Nov	Dec	Year
Mean daily maximum °C (°F)	36.5 (97.7)	37.8 (100.0)	38.5 (101.3)	37.0 (98.6)	34.6 (94.3)	31.8 (89.2)	30.4 (86.7)	29.4 (84.9)	30.5 (86.9)	31.7 (89.1)	33.3 (91.9)	34.7 (94.5)	33.9 (92.9)
Daily mean °C (°F)	27.2 (81.0)	29.4 (84.9)	30.1 (86.2)	30.0 (86.0)	28.6 (83.5)	26.7 (80.1)	25.4 (77.7)	25.4 (77.7)	25.4 (77.7)	25.9 (78.6)	25.8 (78.4)	25.1 (77.2)	27.1 (80.8)
Mean daily minimum °C (°F)	18.0 (64.4)	20.7 (69.3)	21.3 (70.3)	22.9 (73.2)	22.6 (72.7)	21.2 (70.2)	20.7 (69.3)	21.3 (70.3)	20.4 (68.7)	20.1 (68.2)	18.5 (65.3)	16.2 (61.2)	20.3 (68.6)
Average rainfall mm (inches)	0 (0)	6 (0.2)	24 (0.9)	65 (2.6)	122 (4.8)	151 (5.9)	205 (8.1)	235 (9.3)	231 (9.1)	131 (5.2)	9 (0.4)	0 (0)	1,179 (46.5)
Mean monthly sunshine hours	279	263	250	209	222	189	160	151	157	201	277	268	2,626
Source 1: Normales et records pour la période 2002–2013 à N'Dele,
Source 2: Climate : N'Délé for rainfall totals, Étude méthodologique pour l'utilisation des données climatologiques de l'Afrique tropicale for sunshine hours

Climate data for Birao
Month	Jan	Feb	Mar	Apr	May	Jun	Jul	Aug	Sep	Oct	Nov	Dec	Year
Mean daily maximum °C (°F)	34.7 (94.5)	37.3 (99.1)	39.4 (102.9)	39.7 (103.5)	37.9 (100.2)	35 (95)	31.4 (88.5)	30.8 (87.4)	32.1 (89.8)	34.5 (94.1)	35 (95)	33.6 (92.5)	35.1 (95.2)
Daily mean °C (°F)	23.7 (74.7)	26 (79)	28.8 (83.8)	30.4 (86.7)	30.2 (86.4)	28.3 (82.9)	25.7 (78.3)	25.3 (77.5)	25.9 (78.6)	26.5 (79.7)	23.9 (75.0)	22.5 (72.5)	26.4 (79.6)
Mean daily minimum °C (°F)	12.7 (54.9)	14.8 (58.6)	18.3 (64.9)	21.1 (70.0)	22.5 (72.5)	21.6 (70.9)	20.1 (68.2)	19.8 (67.6)	19.7 (67.5)	18.6 (65.5)	12.8 (55.0)	11.4 (52.5)	17.8 (64.0)
Average rainfall mm (inches)	0 (0)	0 (0)	1 (0.0)	20 (0.8)	67 (2.6)	107 (4.2)	189 (7.4)	193 (7.6)	146 (5.7)	38 (1.5)	1 (0.0)	0 (0)	762 (29.8)
Source: Climate-Data.org

== Forests ==
=== Tree cover extent and loss ===
Global Forest Watch publishes annual estimates of tree cover loss and 2000 tree cover extent derived from time-series analysis of Landsat satellite imagery in the Global Forest Change dataset. In this framework, tree cover refers to vegetation taller than 5 m (including natural forests and tree plantations), and tree cover loss is defined as the complete removal of tree cover canopy for a given year, regardless of cause.

For the Central African Republic, country statistics report cumulative tree cover loss of 1,076,630 ha (10,766.3 km^{2}) from 2001 to 2024 (about 2.3% of its 2000 tree cover area). For tree cover density greater than 30%, country statistics report a 2000 tree cover extent of 47,073,506 ha (470,735.06 km^{2}). The charts and table below display this data. In simple terms, the annual loss number is the area where tree cover disappeared in that year, and the extent number shows what remains of the 2000 tree cover baseline after subtracting cumulative loss. Forest regrowth is not included in the dataset.

Annual tree cover loss in the Central African Republic, 2001–2024. View chart definition.
Tree cover extent in 2000 minus cumulative tree cover loss in the Central African Republic, 2001–2024 (loss-only residual; does not account for gain). View chart definition.

Annual tree cover extent and loss
Year	Tree cover extent (km2) (Note: This residual measure does not include forest regrowth.)	Annual tree cover loss (km2)
2001	470,422.24	312.82
2002	470,078.06	344.18
2003	469,940.79	137.27
2004	469,794.91	145.88
2005	469,501.74	293.17
2006	468,922.91	578.83
2007	468,549.83	373.08
2008	468,231.23	318.60
2009	467,748.70	482.53
2010	467,263.16	485.54
2011	466,771.76	491.40
2012	466,198.61	573.15
2013	465,756.78	441.83
2014	465,178.26	578.52
2015	464,905.11	273.15
2016	464,393.58	511.53
2017	463,754.49	639.09
2018	463,345.36	409.13
2019	462,855.10	490.26
2020	462,303.73	551.37
2021	461,631.92	671.81
2022	461,121.63	510.29
2023	460,576.28	545.35
2024	459,968.76	607.52

== Facts ==
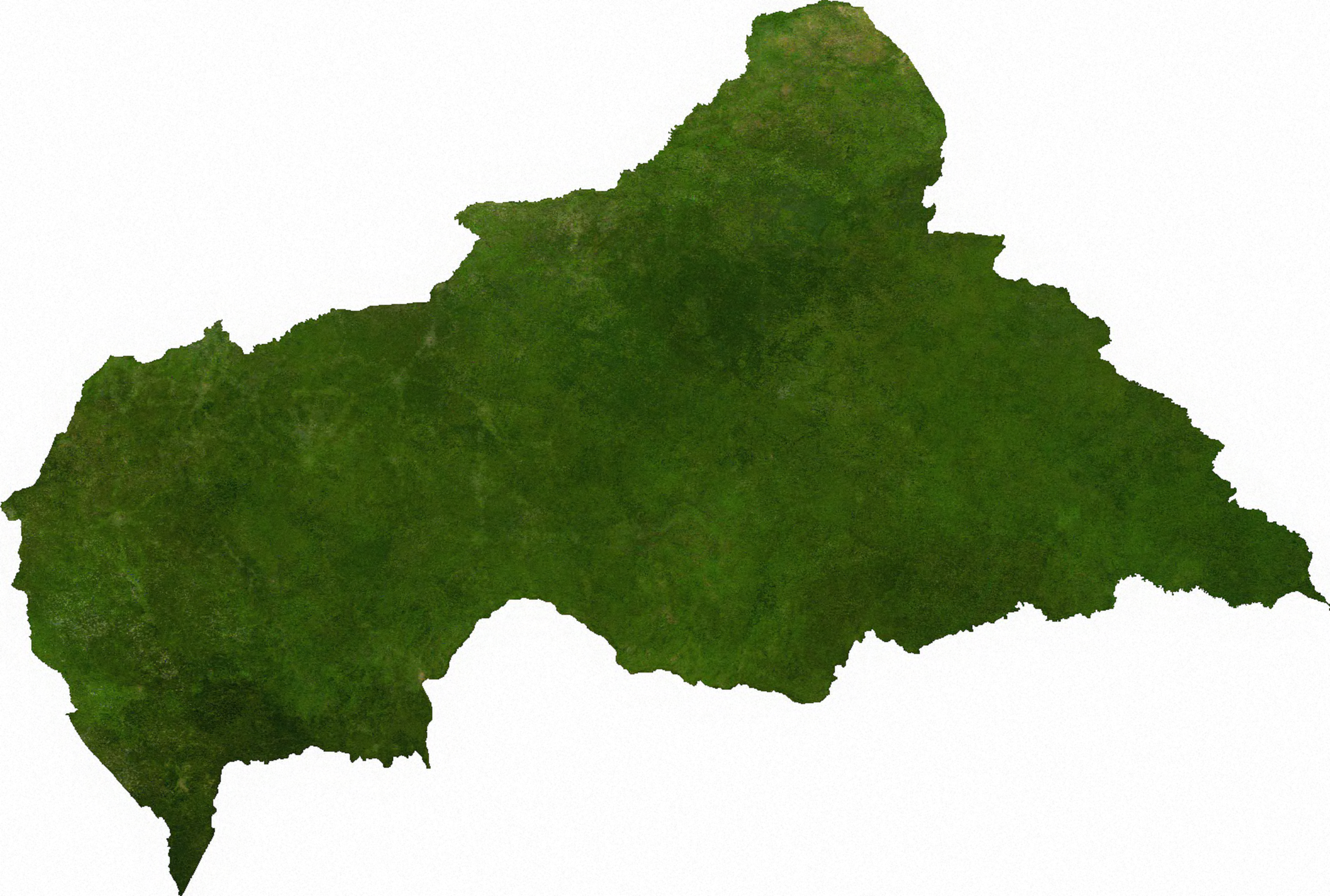
A satellite map of the Central African Republic.

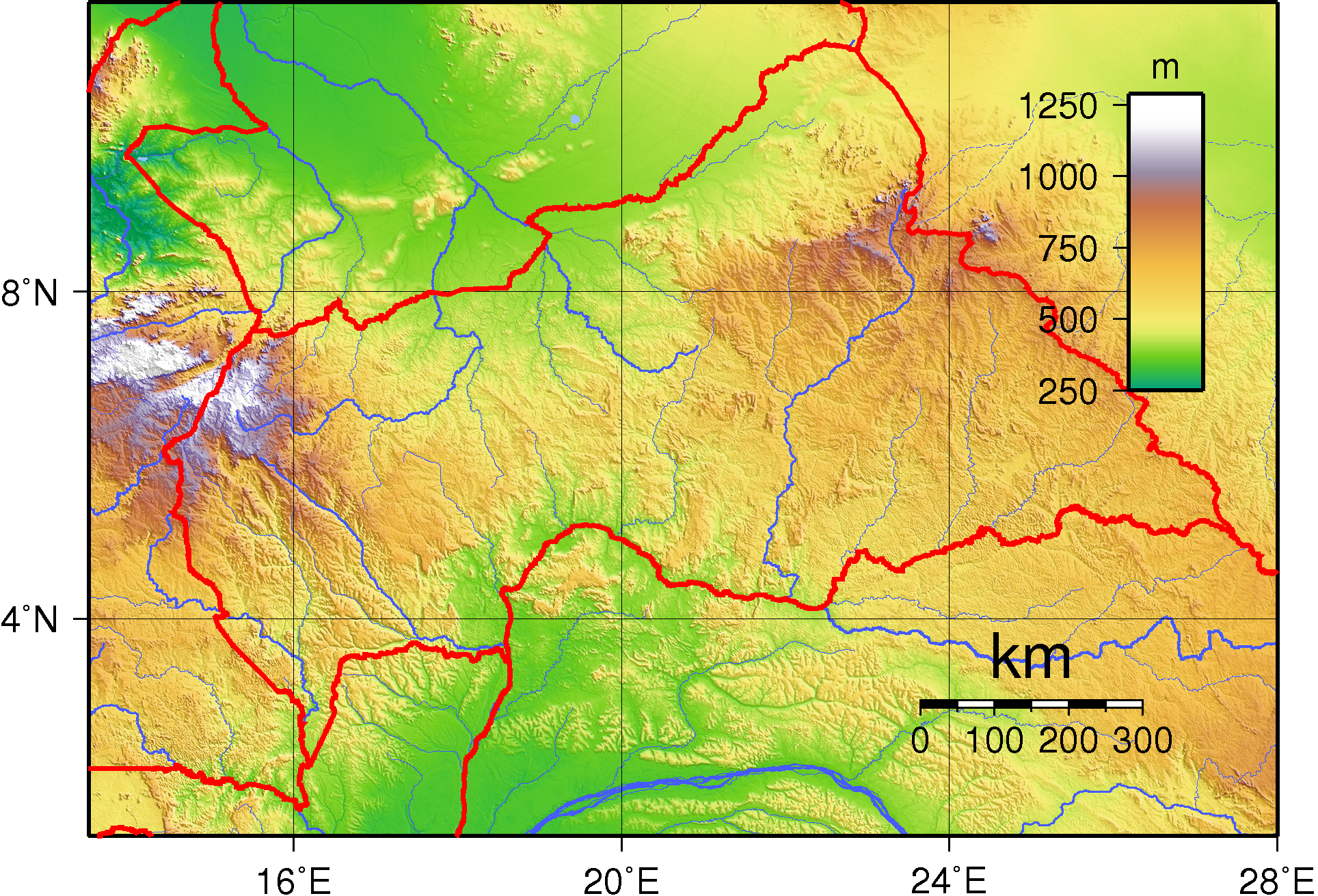
Topography of Central African Republic.

Location: Central Africa, north of Democratic Republic of the Congo

Area comparative
- Slightly smaller than Somalia
- Slightly larger than Ukraine
- Australia comparative: slightly more than 3/4 the size of New South Wales
- Canada comparative: slightly smaller than Manitoba
- United Kingdom comparative: slightly more than 2 1/2 times the size of the United Kingdom
- United States comparative: approximately 1/10 smaller than Texas
- EU comparative: approximately 1/5 larger than Spain

Land boundaries
- total:
  - 5,920 kilometres or 3,679 miles
border countries
- Cameroon 901 kilometres or 560 miles
- Chad 1,556 kilometres or 967 miles
- Democratic Republic of the Congo 1,747 kilometres or 1,086 miles
- Republic of the Congo 487 kilometres or 303 miles
- Sudan 174 kilometres or 108 miles
- South Sudan 1,055 kilometres or 656 miles

Coastline

km (landlocked)

Terrain

vast, flat to rolling, monotonous plateau; scattered hills in northeast and southwest

Elevation extremes
- lowest point: Oubangui River 335 metres or 1,099 feet
- highest point: Mont Ngaoui 1,410 metres or 4,626 feet

Natural resources
- diamonds, uranium, timber, gold, petroleum, hydropower

Land use (2012 est.)
- arable land: 2.89%
- permanent crops: 0.13%
- other: 96.98%

Irrigated land (2003)

1.35 square kilometres or 0.52 square miles

Total renewable water resources

144.4 cubic kilometres or 34.6 cubic miles (2011)

Freshwater withdrawal (domestic/industrial/agricultural)
- total:
  - 0.07 cubic kilometres (0.02 mi^{3})/yr (83%/17%/1%)
- per capita:
  - 17.42 cubic metres (615.18 cu ft)/yr (2005)

Natural hazards
- hot, dry, dusty harmattan winds affect northern areas
- floods are common

Environment — current issues
- tap water is not potable
- poaching has diminished its reputation as one of the last great wildlife refuges
- desertification

Environment — international agreements
- party to:
  - Biodiversity
  - Climate Change
  - Desertification
  - Endangered Species
  - Hazardous Wastes
  - Nuclear Test Ban
  - Ozone Layer Protection
  - Tropical Timber 94
  - Wetlands
- signed, but not ratified:
  - Law of the Sea

Geography — note
- landlocked; almost the precise center of Africa

== Extreme points ==
This is a list of the extreme points of the Central African Republic, the points that are farther north, south, east or west than any other location.

- Northernmost point – unnamed location in the Aoukal river on the border with Chad, Vakaga Prefecture
- Easternmost point – unnamed location immediately East of the tripoint with South Sudan and the Democratic Republic of the Congo and south of the town of Ezo in South Sudan, Haut-Mbomou Prefecture
- Southernmost point – the tripoint with Cameroon and the Republic of Congo, Sangha-Mbaéré Prefecture
- Westernmost point – unnamed location on the border with Cameroon west of the town of Koundé in Central African Republic near Cameroon's Lokoti to Garoua Boulai road, Nana-Mambéré Prefecture
