= 2026 in the Central African Republic =

- Decades: 2000s; 2010s; 2020s
- See also: Other events of 2026; History of the Central African Republic

The following is a list of events of the year 2026 in the Central African Republic.

== Incumbents ==
- President: Faustin-Archange Touadéra
- Prime Minister: Félix Moloua

== Events ==
- 19 January – The Constitutional Court validates President Faustin-Archange Touadéra's victory in the 2025 Central African general election.
- 12 March – Eight people are killed when an artisanal mine collapses in Nourroum, Ouham-Pendé.
- 16 June – The Special Criminal Court in Bangui begins the trial in absentia of former president François Bozizé, on charges of crimes against humanity, murder, enforced disappearances, rape committed by members of his Presidential Guard, and torture.
- 13 August – The French Foreign Ministry opens disciplinary proceedings against its ambassador to the Central African Republic, Bruno Foucher, following allegations that he brought around 30 young women to his official residence in Bangui between January 2024 and March 2026.
- 19 August – 2026 Zamboye mine collapse: At least 100 people are killed when an artisanal gold mine collapses due to a landslide in Zamboye, near Baboua.
- 23 September – The International Criminal Court convicts former Seleka commander Mahamat Said Abdel Kani of crimes against humanity during his administration of running a detention facility in Bangui during the Central African Republic Civil War in 2013.

== Holidays ==
- 1 January – New Year's Day
- 29 March – Barthelemy Boganda Day
- 30 March – Korité
- 6 April – Easter Monday
- 1 May – Labour Day
- 14 May – Ascension Day
- 25 May – Whit Monday
- 6 June – Tabaski
- 30 June – General Prayer Day
- 13 August – Independence Day
- 15 August – Assumption Day
- 1 November – All Saints' Day
- 1 December – National Day
- 25 December – Christmas Day

== Deaths ==
- 5 November – Marcel Ndalé, 65–66, militant and warlord.
- 16 November – Nicolas Tiangaye, 70, lawyer, prime minister (2013-2014).

== See also ==
- African Continental Free Trade Area
- Community of Sahel–Saharan States
