= Bondiba =

- Location in Central African Republic
- Coordinates: 5°31′33″N 14°47′12″E
- Country: Central African Republic
- Prefecture: Nana-Mambéré
- Sub-prefecture: Baboua
- Commune: Baboua

Population (2015)
  - Total: 1,350

Bondiba is a village located in Nana-Mambéré Prefecture, Central African Republic.

== History ==
An armed group attacked Bondiba on 5 December 2014. They killed one person and torched 283 houses. While searching for an ox stolen by FDPC, an armed group attacked Bondiba on 20 December 2016. One villager was killed and others were injured. Responding to this attack, the villagers fled to the bush.

3R rebel shot two moto-taxi drivers and managed to kill one in Bondiba on 18 March 2021 for collaborating with the government. On 4 August 2021, Wagner forces executed two civilians in Bondiba. Bondiba residents protested against MINSUCA in August 2021 due to the allegation of Bangladesh peacekeepers colluding with 3R. They demanded the total withdrawal of the Bangladesh contingent from the village. In September 2021, MINUSCA announced the total departure of its forces from Bondiba.

Three months later, on 8 November 2021, Wagner forces visited Bondiba. As soon as they arrived in the village, they tackled FACA soldiers stationed there to the ground and looted their belongings. Moreover, they also robbed shops. As a result, the FACA soldiers withdrew from Bondiba and most villagers fled the village.

CPC rebels attacked three FACA checkpoints in Bondiba on 25 January 2023. FACA soldiers withdrew and CPC captured the village.

== Education ==
There is one primary school in Bondiba.

== Healthcare ==
The village has one health post.

== Bibliography ==
- ACF (February 2015). Evaluation RRM: Village de Bondiba dans la sous- préfecture de Baboua dans la préfecture de la Nana Mambéré - février 2014 Rapport d’évaluation MSA (PDF) (Report).
