= 2026 Zamboye mine collapse =

Mining disaster in the Central African Republic

- Zamboye (Central African Republic)
- Date: August 18, 2026
- Time: 14:00 (WAT)
- Location: Zamboye, Baboua, Nana-Mambéré, Central African Republic; approx. 5°32′38″N 14°36′54″E
- Cause: Several mining tunnels collapsed, triggering a landslide and cave-in
- Deaths: 49–107+
- Injuries: 7

On the afternoon of 18 August 2026, an open-pit gold mine operating in Zamboye near the Cameroon–Central African Republic border collapsed, causing a landslide that killed at least 49 people, injured seven others, and left several people missing. Official estimates from the Central African government put the confirmed death toll at 49; meanwhile local sources, witnesses, independent news outlets, and other agencies say that more than a hundred people were killed.

== Background ==
Zamboye, also alternatively spelled as Zamboï, refers to two villages found on the Kadei River basin of the border between Cameroon and the Central African Republic. It is home to the Moscow-RCA artisanal gold mining site, operated by the company Douakouzou, where more than 15,000 people go each day, according to RFI. Workers used to access the area on foot or by canoe, until the site was closed a few days after the disaster. Per the Associated Press, a portion of the country's population depends on small-scale mining for livelihoods, while poor regulations and exposure to high-risk environments could often lead to fatal outcomes. United Nations experts reported in 2025 that illicit mining was taking place in the area, with armed groups reportedly involved and extraction techniques contributing to serious health and environmental risks.

Incidents such as the Zamboye tragedy are common at artisanal operations in Africa, especially during the rainy season. In March 2026, eight people were killed and five others injured in Ouham-Pendé after another artisanal mine collapsed. In May 2026, the Bé-Mbari gold mine, located 250 km (160 mi) from Bouar and on the Cameroonian border, collapsed, killing at least 23 people. At least 40 miners have been killed in several incidents and landslides in the nation since the beginning of the year.

== Incident ==
At about 14:00 WAT on 18 August 2026, a landslide occurred at the Moscow-RCA section of the Zamboye mines, burying dozens of people and caving in the shafts beneath. Five hundred laborers were present at the time of the cave-in. Baboua's public prosecutor stated in court that several underground tunnels of the mining site collapsed, causing a landslide.

== Victims ==
According to the government's Mines Ministry, 49 deaths were confirmed—34 Central Africans, 13 Cameroonians, and two Chadians. Cameroonian authorities also confirmed that four of their citizens were killed in the landslide. The four were buried in the nearby town of Garoua-Boulaï, eastern Cameroon. Seven injured people were brought to a hospital in Baboua town, about 50 km (31 mi) from the grounds.

== Aftermath ==
An investigation was opened to determine the cause, identify the victims and operators, and to establish any potential criminal liability. A prosecutor in the investigation said that the landslide was "predictable" as the miners dug deep pits to extract gold. Local Red Cross and relief volunteers helped search for those buried in debris; they claimed that more than 100 people died in the landslide, with the death toll expected to rise. Rescuers also stated that they lacked the proper equipment and rescue capacity needed for a tragedy at that scale. Heavy machinery and tractors were used in the operations, potentially endangering those who were still trapped. Local outlets say that 107 bodies were recovered from the debris. During the operations, the Central African Armed Forces asked other miners to leave the open pit area because it had been raining for 72 hours. After they did not comply, the ground gave way, burying more miners, according to the Mines Minister.

Days after the incident, the government temporarily closed the area, citing concerns with unauthorized mining and "non-compliance with mining standards". Thousands of miners were prevented from entering the site during its closure. Security reinforcements, including Wagner Group personnel, were brought to the site. Later investigations stated that the site had closed two weeks before the incident, adding that youths allegedly encouraged other residents to resume mining operations.

=== Reactions ===
- Bishop Mirosław Gucwa of Bouar expressed sympathies and offered condolences to the victims' relatives.
- Roger Justin Noah, secretary-general of the Cameroon Renaissance Movement, condemned the mismanagement of gold mining across the country, further saying that the problem needed to be prioritized.
- Maurice Kamto, a runner-up of the 2018 Cameroonian presidential election, said the accident revealed the "inhumanity of the illegal exploitation of minerals".
- Chairman of the African Minerals Strategy Group (AMSG) and Nigeria Minister of Solid Materials Development Henry Dele Alake called for stricter mining measures across Africa following the disaster, expressing condolences in a statement.

== See also ==
- 2026 Kifula gold mine landslide
- List of mines in Cameroon
- Ndassima
