= Zoukombo =

- Location in Central African Republic
- Coordinates: 5°50′5″N 14°40′59″E
- Country: Central African Republic
- Prefecture: Nana-Mambéré
- Sub-prefecture: Baboua
- Commune: Baboua

Zoukombo is a village located along the National Road 1 that connected Bangui to Cameroon-CAR border in Nana-Mambéré Prefecture. During Central African Republic Civil War, Zoukombo was the headquarter of the FDPC rebel group up until 5 April 2019.

== History ==
On 20 May 2016, 35 FDPC fighters occupied the village school because they wanted to find a better place to stay in. The school was abandoned by the FDPC fighters on 2 October 2016 after the MINUSCA intervention.

FDPC erected roadblocks of Highway 1 in Zoukombo in early March 2019. On 5 April 2019, MINUSCA carried out a military operation in Zoukombo to regain 11 government-owned vehicles that were stolen by FDPC back on 3 March. The UN peacekeeping forces captured the village and killed FDPC fighters.

On 2 September 2021, 3R rebels occupied the village and disturbed the traffic.

== Education ==
Zoukombo has one primary school.
