= Nguia-Bouar =

- Location in Central African Republic
- Coordinates: 5°13′18″N 14°41′37″E
- Country: Central African Republic
- Prefecture: Nana-Mambéré
- Sub-prefecture: Baboua
- Commune: Baboua

Nguia-Bouar is a village situated in Nana-Mambéré Prefecture, Central African Republic.

== History ==
At the end of 2017, the gendarmes withdrew from Nguia-Bouar following the incursion of 3R rebels. Bangladesh contingent of MINUSCA captured the village from Siriri on 28 April 2018 after the failed negotiations that asked the rebels to leave. 3R militias attacked IDP camp in the village on 9 June 2021. Wagner's helicopter bombarded a mining site near the village on 30 August 2021, causing the residents to flee to the bush.

Wagner withdrew its forces from Nguia-Bouar on 19 January 2023. Following the Wagner's defeat in a battle against CPC near Nguia-Bouar on 10 September 2023, FACA, Wagner, and Rwanda forces conducted military operation against the rebels in the village on 13 September, causing the villagers to flee to the bush.

== Education ==
Nguia-Bouar has one school.

== Healthcare ==
There is a health center in the village.
