= Marcel Ndalé =

Central African militant (1960–2026)

- Born: Gbokaho Minang Sylvain; 1960; Niem, Nana-Mambéré, Central African Republic
- Died: 5 November 2026 (aged 65–66) near Pendéré, Nana-Mambéré, Central African Republic
- Other name: Marcel Ndalé
- Spouse: Nafissatou Ndalé
- Children: 2
- Military career
- Allegiance: Anti-balaka (2013–2026); Coalition of Patriots for Change (2020–2026)
- Service years: 2013–2026
- Conflicts: Central African Bush War; Central African Republic Civil War †

Gbokaho Minang Sylvain (1960 – 5 November 2026), also known by his nom de guerre Marcel Ndalé and nickname "King of the Bush", was a Central African militant and a field commander of the Anti-balaka movement in the Nana-Mambéré prefecture during the Central African Republic Civil War.

== Biography ==
=== Early life and militant career ===
Ndalé was born in 1960 in Niem village in Nana-Mambéré province as Gbokaho Minang Sylvain. In 2006 he created a self-defense group to fight with zaraguina bandits together with his two brothers. They also were creating gri-gris amulets. They settled with their extended family in Bouar. In June 2013 following Séléka takeover of the Central African Republic he fled to the bush where he led group of Anti-balaka fighters. On 22 January 2014 he arrived in Bouar seizing former Séléka base. He was arrested by MINUSCA in April 2015 and placed in Nagaragba prison in Bangui where he escaped in 2015. He became Anti-balaka's zone commander in Nana-Mambéré together with two brothers forming Ndalé's clique (officially under command of Patrice-Edouard Ngaïssona, de facto acting independently), which mainly benefitted from imposing taxes on cattle trade. From 2015 to 2017 his group had stolen 4,000 head of cattle in the area, leading to clashes with 3R armed group. On 19 September 2017 his group clashed with armed forces who were deployed in Bouar two days earlier.

On 15 December 2017, his group signed a peace agreement with 3R armed group. On 3 October 2018 his group signed another ceasefire with 3R aimed at facilitating return of displaced people to Koui. He reportedly collected illegal taxes at Yongo, north of Bouar from people going to cattle market. On 16 September 2020 his 12 year old daughter and 18 year old son were kidnapped near Baboua, with son being released shortly after. He threatened to raise up his arms again if she's not released. In December 2020 he and his brother joined Coalition of Patriots for Change seizing Bouar. In January 2021 his group killed two herders and stole their cattle and detained and tortured individuals at their base in the Tropicana district for more than two weeks. On 5 May 2021 his fighters attacked Abba. As of August 2022 he remains active in Coalition of Patriots for Change. On 12 October 2022 he was reportedly seen in the vicinity of Ndiba billage near Abba, day before the attack. On 28 November 2022 he ordered an attack on vehicle with Chinese workers on Niem-Yelewa axis, during which one soldier was killed.

=== Personal life ===
As of February 2014 he reportedly had a wife, Nafissatou Ndalé, and brothers Ibrahim and Adouma Ndalé who also fought with him in Anti-balaka.

=== Death ===
The CAR Defense Ministry announced the killing of Marcel and Adouma Ndalé on 6 November 2026 in a joint operation conducted by the country's armed forces and Russian allies south of Pendéré the previous day. The MoD claimed that Ndalé had prepared attacks on government forces, as well as an incursion into Cameroon. Nine militants were reportedly killed overall.
