= Cantonnier =

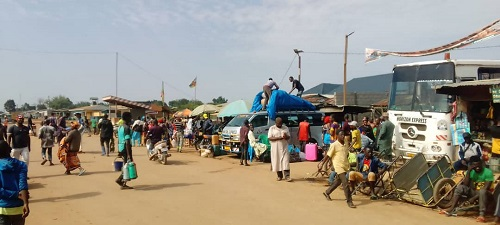
- Cantonnier town

- Location in Central African Republic
- Coordinates: 5°54′32″N 14°33′32″E
- Country: Central African Republic
- Prefecture: Nana-Mambéré
- Sub-prefecture: Baboua
- Commune: Koundé

Cantonnier is a border town situated near Cameroon–Central African Republic border in Nana-Mambéré Prefecture.

== History ==
French troops entered Cantonnier in December 2013. In January 2014, Anti-balaka captured Cantonnier from Seleka group. MISCA forces clashed with Anti-balaka on 11 February 2014, killing two militias and six civilians. A clash between self-defense group and Anti-balaka occurred in the town on 23 August 2014 due to the Anti-balaka's harassment towards town residents. One Anti-balaka member and a woman were killed.

MINUSCA forces attacked Anti-balaka in Cantonnier on 19 November 2014 after the failed disarmament attempt of the militia. Seven people were killed and dozens injured. The town residents fled to Béloko. Afterward, MINUSCA took control of the town. Nevertheless, Anti-balaka entered the town again and erected four checkpoint in it, which were dismantled on 14 January 2016 by MINUSCA and gendarmerie.

CPC captured Cantonnier along with Béloko on 23 December 2020, causing the residents fleeing to Cameroon. CPC then retreated from Cantonnier on 30 December. On 11 February 2021 morning, joint FACA, Wagner and RDF forces seized the town from rebels.

== Territorial issues ==
Cantonnier is facing territorial issues and a buffer zone dispute with Cameroon. Two neighborhoods, Sango and Pétévo neighborhoods, were under Cameroon control, and Cameroon citizens dwelled in Cantonnier. In January 2023, the town residents held a demonstration against the construction of the Cameroon administrative office in the disputed buffer zone and later it was stopped. Previously, Cameroon attempted to build an administrative office in the disputed buffer zone, which then halted due to an order from Jean-Serge Bokassa.

== Economy ==
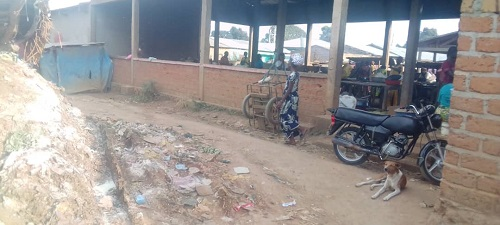
Cantonnier market

The town has a market. Trade is the main economic activity in the town.

== Education ==
There is a primary school in Cantonnier. However, no high schools are available in the town; hence elementary school graduates who want to enroll in high school have to go to either Bouar or Baboua.

== Healthcare ==
Cantonnier has one health center.

== Media ==
There is a radio station in Cantonnier which is Radio Lagbata.

== Security ==
The town has a police and gendarmerie office.
