= Béloko =

- Location in Central African Republic
- Coordinates: 5°56′7″N 14°36′20″E
- Country: Central African Republic
- Prefecture: Nana-Mambéré
- Sub-prefecture: Baboua
- Commune: Baboua

Béloko is a village located near Central African Republic-Cameroon border in Nana-Mambéré Prefecture.

== History ==
=== Central African Republic Civil War (2012-present) ===
Haut Conseil de Résistance et du Redressement National (HCRRN) captured Béloko from ex-Seleka on 10 January 2014. Nine days later, ex-Seleka militias attacked the HCRRN outpost in Béloko and the attack was foiled.

CPC rebels seized Béloko from government forces on 23 December 2020, causing the residents to take refuge in Cameroon. Six days later, CPC withdrew from Béloko. On 11 February 2021, FACA, with assistance from Wagner Group and Rwanda Forces, recaptured Béloko.

CPC attacked FACA and Wagner positions in Béloko on 21 January 2023 at 5 am. Although FACA and Wagner group managed to repel the attack, 20 vehicles and a customs office were burned. Two civilians and two Wagner Group members were killed during the attack. Due to the attack, the border was closed until 25 January 2023.

Although CPC's attack on 21 January 2023 was foiled, the threats of another rebel incursion to Béloko emerged. On 23 January 2023, the residents left Béloko and the security forces took position after hearing the presence of CPC militia behind the hill who wanted to invade Béloko. Nevertheless, the attack did not happen. On 12 March 2023, Wagner informed the local governments that CPC was preparing to invade Béloko. As a result, vehicles and trucks that were in the custom posts went back to Cantonnier.

3R rebels stormed FACA and Wagner positions in Beloko on 18 September 2023 and the attack was repelled. One civilian got injured due to the attack.

== Economy ==
There is a customs office in Béloko. The custom office holds economic importance as 80% of CAR imports pass through it.

== Healthcare ==
Béloko has one health post.
