= Abdoulaye Miskine =

African warlord

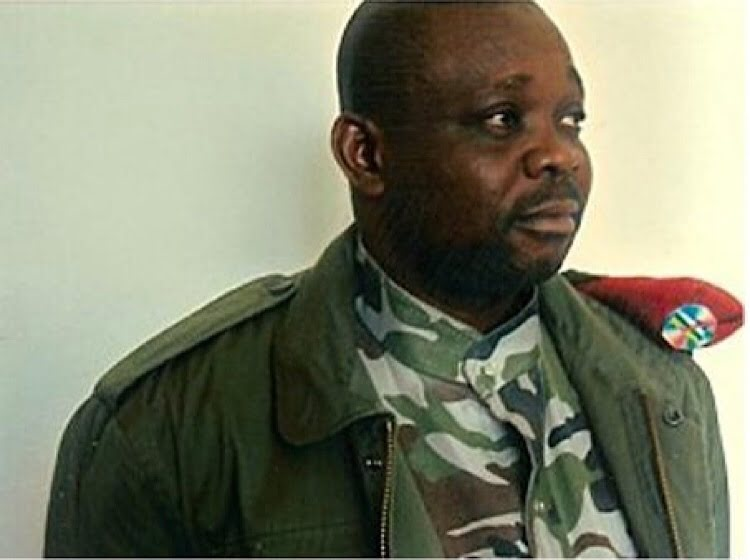
- Born: October 5, 1965 (age 61); Ndinaba, Moyen-Chari, Chad
- Military career
- Allegiance: Central African Armed Forces
- Service years: ?–2003
- Military career
- Allegiance: Democratic Front of the Central African People
- Service years: 2004–2019

Abdoulaye Miskine (born Martin Koutamadji; 5 October 1965) is a Chadian-Central African warlord and a former Central African Armed Forces officer who served under Patasse Government. He was the leader of Democratic Front of the Central African People.

== Early life ==
Martin Koutamadji was born on 5 October 1965 in Ndinaba, Chad. His father was Chadian and his mother was Central African. Koutamadji was raised in Central African Republic by his mother since his father died when he was a child. At the age of 18 years old, he moved to Nigeria and converted to Islam; changed his named to Abdoulaye Miskine.

== Military career ==
He joined Central African Armed Forces in an unknown year. After a failed coup attempt in 2001, Patassé put Miskine in charge of leading a special militia unit consisting of 300 Chadian mercenaries due distrust with Bozizé and the refusal of Idriss Déby to send reinforcements. Patasse tasked Miskine to fight zaraguina as well as armed oppositions around the CAR-Chadian Border and protect the president. Miskine established his base in Kabo and fought against the Pro-Bozizé militia. By late November 2002, his forces troops increased from 300 to 600.

Miskine's special forces were accused of human rights abuses. His forces were responsible for killing 180 Chadians and robbing cattle breeders. Moreover, Miskine's militia was blamed for PK 13 Cattle Market massacre in Bangui on 31 October 2002.

On 2 October 2002, Chad and the Central African Republic signed the final communiqué of the Libreville Accords to restore the diplomatic relations between the two countries. One of the agreements was called Miskine's and Bozizé's expulsion from the Central African Republic and Chad, respectively. Miskine left the Central African Republic for Togo on 5 November 2002. Before he left CAR, Patasse decorated Miskine with commander insignia of the Central African Order of Merit.

In January 2012, Miskine allied with the Central African Armed Forces and Chad National Army in fighting against Baba Laddé.

== Rebellion ==
As François Bozizé rose to power, Miskine founded the Democratic Front of the Central African People on 14 June 2004 to topple Bozizé from power.

In 2007, he signed a peace agreement between rebels and the government in Sirte, Libya, under the mediation of Colonel Muammar Gaddafi. Miskine soon returned to Central African Republic. Nevertheless, he fled to Libya after realizing that the government did not provide the facilities he wanted. On 15 July 2007, the government announced that Miskine was given a position as a presidential advisor. However, he declined that position because he claimed that the government did not execute the promises under the peace agreement.

In February 2009, Miskine resumed the insurrection by attacking the gendarmerie garrison in Batangafo. On 3 July 2009, he signed the act of adherence to the Global Peace Agreement in Tripoli because of Gaddafi's pressure. However, he broke the act because the government arrested two members of the Democratic Front of the Central African People in Bangui. Nevertheless, Bozizé appointed Miskine as a presidential advisor in charge of disarmament, demobilization, and reintegration on 13 January 2011.

In the fall of 2012, he joined Séléka to overthrow Bozizé. Just before Battle of Bangui began, the Democratic Front of the Central African People left Seleka. Soon after, on 2–4 April 2013, the Democratic Front of the Central African People clashed with Seleka and Miskine wounded. In September 2013, Miskine joined the pro-Bozizé group, Front pour la restauration de l’ordre constitutionnel en Centrafrique.

Miskine was arrested in Bertoua, Cameroon on 16 September 2013 on the allegation that he might use Cameroon as a base for cross border raid. Subsequently, he was transferred to Yaoundé and put into the custody of special police service. Cameroon released Miskine on 27 November 2014 in exchange of 26 hostages, including a Polish Catholic priest, who were abducted by Democratic Front of the Central African People. Subsequently, he flew to Brazzaville with Denis Sassou Nguesso's private plane and was welcomed by Congolese Minister of Interior, Raymond Mboulou, when he arrived. In Brazzaville, he signed an accord to participate in the disarmament, demobilization and reintegration program on 1 June 2017.

In February 2019, he signed the peace agreement in Khartoum and the government offered Miskine as Minister of the Modernization of the Administration and Innovation of the Public Services. However, he refused to accept the position and only wanted a job position as a senior military officer instead. In June 2019, he returned to Central African Republic after five years of staying in Brazzaville and went to Am Dafok. In Am Dafok, he threatened to overthrow Faustin-Archange Touadéra. Miskine tried recruiting fighters to fight against the government. Responding to Miskine's threat, Bangui issued an arrest warrant to Miskine on 3 August.

=== Arrest and trial ===
On 14 October 2019, an inter-rebel clash between Popular Front for the Rebirth of Central African Republic and Movement of Central African Liberators for Justice broke up in Am Dafok and it led Miskine to flee to Tissi and Chad. As he arrived in Harare Mangueigne, Chad, the Chadian authorities arrested Abdoulaye Miskine in November 2019. He was brought to N'Djamena and placed under the custody of the National Security Agency. Responding to the arrest, the Central African government issued the extradition request of Abdoulaye Miskine and N'djamena refused Bangui's demand.

Miskine's legal process begin in 2020. He was accused of rape and fomenting rebellion. As of 2022, he was jailed in Klessoum Prison and Miskine began his trial on 29 July 2022. On 9 July 2024 he was reportedly released from jail.

=== Sanctions ===
In 2014, the US imposed sanctions on five Central African Republic prominent figures, including Miskine. The UN imposed sanctions on Abdoulaye Miskine in 2020.

== Award ==
- , Commander Order of Central African Merit - 2002

== Bibliography ==
- International Federation for Human Rights (June 2014). Central African Republic: "They must all leave or die." (PDF) (Report). International Federation for Human Rights.
- International Federation for Human Rights (February 2003). War crimes in the Central African Republic: "When the elephants fight, the grass suffers" (Report). International Federation for Human Rights.
- United Nations Security Council (30 July 2019). Letter dated 30 July 2019 from the Panel of Experts on the Central African Republic extended pursuant to resolution 2454 (2019) addressed to the President of the Security Council (PDF) (Report). Mercy Corps.
