= Lamy-Pont =

Lamy-Pont Lamy-Pong
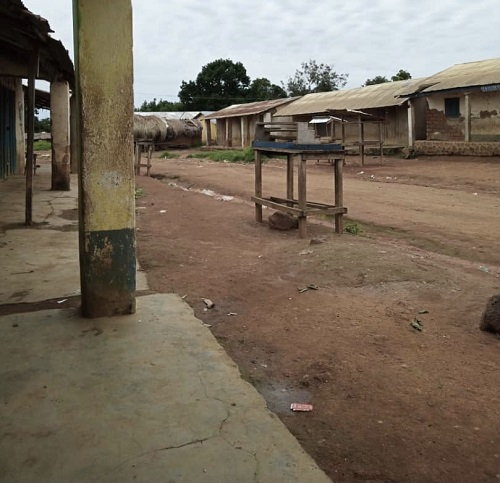
- Lamy-Pont in 2021

- Location in Central African Republic
- Coordinates: 5°11′15″N 15°1′59″E
- Country: Central African Republic
- Prefecture: Nana-Mambéré
- Sub-prefecture: Abba
- Commune: Abba

Population (2020)
  - Total: 4,035

Lamy-Pont, also known as Lamy-Pong and Lamy, is a village situated in Nana-Mambéré Prefecture, Central African Republic.

== History ==
Wagner launched airstrikes in Lamy-Pont on 31 August 2021, forcing the villagers to seek refuge in the bush. Later, they returned to the village. Joint FACA-Wagner Forces conducted military operations in the village on 31 October, forcing the residents to flee to Cameroon. As the soldiers arrived, Lamy-Pont was deserted and they looted shops. In January 2023, Wagner abandoned their posts in the village.

== Economy ==
Near the village, there is a gold mine site in a site named Zongo. The locals used to work and relied on the mine for livelihood before a Chinese company took over the site.

== Education ==
There is a school in Lamy-Pont.

== Healthcare ==
The village has one health post.
