= Zamboye =

Village in the Central African Republic

- Village
- Interactive map of Zamboye
- Country: Central African Republic
- Prefecture: Nana-Mambéré
- Sub-prefecture: Baboua

Zamboye (Note: French: Zamboï) is a cross-border locality located in Baboua sub-prefecture, Central African Republic, at the border with Cameroon. It is located on the riverbed of the Kadei River, which forms part of the border with Cameroon.

== 2026 gold mine accident ==
The gold mine pit was the scene of a collapse in August 2026 that killed more than 100 people, according to local sources and reports. The official death toll was initially given as 49, including 34 Central Africans, 13 Cameroonians and two Chadians. Seven injured people were taken to a hospital in Baboua, about 50 kilometres from the mining site.

The mine collapse occurred in the afternoon after part of the gold mine collapsed for an unknown reason. Hundreds of people were reportedly working at the mine when a shaft collapsed, burying miners beneath rocks and earth. Rescue efforts were hampered by further collapses, heavy rain and flooding in lower parts of the mine.

The Central African government subsequently closed the Zamboye mining site, citing non-compliance with mining standards and administrative directives. The site had reportedly already been closed before the accident, although illegal miners continued to work there. The government continued an investigation into the collapse.
