= Besson, Central African Republic =

Besson
- Location in Central African Republic
- Coordinates: 6°15′45″N 14°48′57″E
- Country: Central African Republic
- Prefecture: Nana-Mambéré
- Sub-prefecture: Baboua
- Commune: Gaudrot

Besson is a village located in Nana-Mambéré Prefecture, Central African Republic. It is the capital of Gaudrot Commune. Peuhl herders from Chad and Cameroon often visit Besson.

== History ==
From March until September 2015, Besson was often attacked by armed groups. This resulted in the residents seeking refuge in Cameroon, Niem, and Baboua. However, as the situation improved in October and December 2015 due to the presence of MINUSCA and FACA, Besson refugees returned to their village.

3R Rebel group took control of Besson on 13 May 2020 by disarming the local gendarmerie. MINUSCA and FACA liberated Besson from 3R on 26 July 2020.

CPC rebels attacked Besson on 24 January 2023. The battle lasted for two hours and the government forces withdrew several kilometers away from the village. The rebels killed one FACA soldier and injured others. They also burned several houses in Besson. Later on, CPC retreated from the village. Due to the attack, the villagers fled Besson.

3R Rebels attacked Besson on 24 September 2023 in response to the arrest of two herders by Wagner and causing FACA soldiers to retreat to Baboua.

== Demography ==
Mbororo makes up the majority of the Besson population.

== Economy ==
Livestock farming and artisanal gold panning are the main sources of income for Besson residents.

== Education ==
Besson has one primary school that was built in 1962. In 2014, armed groups occupied and destroyed the school equipment.

== Healthcare ==
Besson has one health center.

== Bibliography ==
- Jaillon, Alexandre; de Brier, Guillaume (November 2019). Mapping artisanal mining sites in the Western Central African Republic (PDF) (Report). International Peace Information Service.
