= Koundé, Central African Republic =

Koundé
- Location in Central African Republic
- Coordinates: 6°6′38″N 14°38′11″E
- Country: Central African Republic
- Prefecture: Nana-Mambéré
- Sub-prefecture: Baboua
- Commune: Koundé

Koundé is a village located near Cameroon-Central African Republic border in Nana-Mambéré Prefecture.

== History ==
Ngaoundere kingdom erected an outpost for slave raids in Koundé before the colonization era. In 1896, the French established a post in Koundé. Koundé was the capital of Baboua Sub-prefecture from 1896 to 1907, when the capital was moved to Baboua.

On 19 March 2019, suspected 3R rebels assassinated the mayor of Koundé and his son. The next day, a clash between 3R and village self-defense group ensued during the mayor's funeral. One 3R rebel member died during the clash. This situation caused the residents to flee to the bush and Cameroon.

3R rebel captured Koundé on 13 May 2020, two hours after the fall of Besson.

== Healthcare ==
Koundé has one health post. In 2020, the maternity unit was built at the health post as part of the Reintegration Project for Ex-Combatants.
