= Baboua =

Baboua may refer to:

- Baboua, Central African Republic
- Baboua, Cameroon
