= Karre Mountains =

- Yade Massif

Highest point
- Peak: Mount Ngaoui
- Elevation: 1,410 m (4,630 ft)

Geography
- Country: Central African Republic

Geology
- Rock type: Granite hills

The Karre Mountains is a range of granite hills in the Central African Republic. Their southern elevations form part of the watershed of the Congo River. The highest point in this range is Mont Ngaoui at 4,625 feet.

== History ==
The Karre Mountains were used as a natural defense by Africans resisting the French Colonists. In the 20th century, during the colonization of Africa, the French had difficulty trying to take Central African Republic due to these mountains.
