= Bi Sidi Souleymane =

Central African militant (1962–2021)

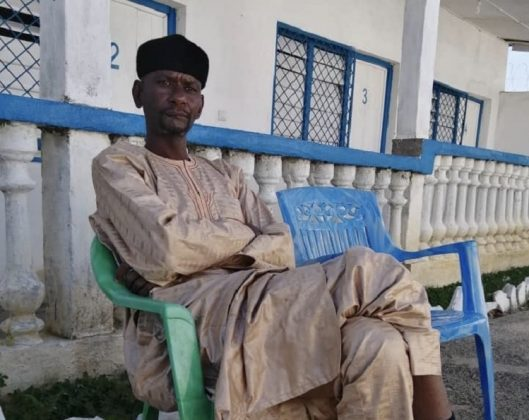
- Born: July 20, 1962; Bocaranga, Central African Republic
- Died: December 18, 2020 (aged 58); Central African Republic
- Other name: Sidiki Abbas
- Military career
- Allegiance: Return, Reclamation, Rehabilitation
- Service years: 2015–2021

Bi Sidi Souleymane (July 20, 1962 – 18 December 2020), also known as Sidiki Abass, was a leader of the Central African Republic (CAR)-based militia group Return, Reclamation, Rehabilitation (3R). The group has killed, tortured, raped, or forcibly displaced thousands of people since 2015, and Souleymane himself has also directly participated in torture. On May 21, 2019, in northwest CAR’s Ouham-Pendé province, 3R killed at least 46 unarmed civilians.

On August 7, 2020, Souleymane was sanctioned by the United States government under Executive Order 13667 and listed in the Specially Designated Nationals and Blocked Persons List.

According to United Nations' sources, Souleymane was killed in action on 18 December 2020, which contradicts 3R April 2021 statement about his death. According to that statement, Souleymane died on 25 March 2021 due to the wounds he sustained during November 2020 attack on the town of Bossembélé.

== See also ==
- Central African Republic Civil War
