= Abu Jaradil =

Abu Jaradil ابو جراديل
- Village
- Location of Abu Jaradil in Sudan
- Coordinates: 10°55′9″N 22°55′1″E
- Country: Sudan
- State: Central Darfur or South Darfur
- Control: Rapid Support Forces
- Time zone: UTC+2 (CAT)

Abu Jaradil (Arabic: ابو جراديل), also spelled Abu Garadil, Abu Jaradel, Abugradil, and Abu Gradil, is a village situated near Central African Republic–Sudan border. The village is known to be a Salamat stronghold.

== Geography ==
Administratively, Abu Jaradil was disputed between Central Darfur and South Darfur. The dispute arose because the village was claimed by Salamat and Taʽisha tribes, thus causing unclear border demarcation between Central Darfur and South Darfur.

== History ==
In 2004, Janjaweed established a camp in Abu Jaradil.

A Misseriya militia led by Ali Kushayb entered Abu Jaradil and clashed with the Salamat armed group on 8 April 2013. During the clash, 16 Salamat militias were killed. The Misseriya militia burned an administrative office. Looting and house burning were also reported during the clash. Due to the clash, some residents fled to Tissi.

Abu Jaradil was reportedly occupied by pastoral nomads and people from Chad, Central African Republic, and Mali in January 2014.

As of October 2023, the village was under RSF control. In April 2024, the villagers faced water scarcity.

== Economy ==
Abu Jaradil has a market.

== Education ==
There is a primary school in the village.
