= Yenga, Central Africa Republic =

Yenga
- Location in Central African Republic
- Coordinates: 5°54′12″N 15°27′5″E
- Country: Central African Republic
- Prefecture: Nana-Mambéré
- Sub-prefecture: Bouar
- Commune: Yenga

Yenga (Yanoyé-Yenga or Yanoye) is a village in Nana-Mambéré, Central African Republic. It is 18 kilometres (11.2 mi) from Bouar and on the main road (RN3) between Bouar and Garoua-Boulaï in the Cameroon.

== History ==
On 7th of January 2023, CPC rebels launched a surprise attack on FACA outpost in Yenga for four hours, killing two FACA soldiers and taking two other soldiers as hostages. In response to this attack on the next day, FACA and Wagner Group visited the village and carried out searches to find out the perpetrators of the attack.

== Healthcare ==
Yenga has one health center.
