= Central African Republic–Sudan border =

International border

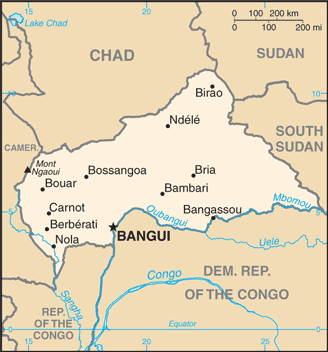
Map of CAR, with Sudan to the northeast

The Central African Republic–Sudan border is 174 km (108 mi) in length and runs from the Central African Republic and Sudan's tripoint with Chad in the north, to their tripoint with South Sudan in the south.

== Description ==
The boundary starts in the north at the tripoint with Chad and proceeds overland in a south-easterly direction, turning south in the vicinity of the Kafia Kingi region, a region disputed with South Sudan but which is currently under Sudanese administration. The border then consists of a series of irregular lines over hilly terrain, turning sharply to the east and then proceeding to the current de facto South Sudanese tripoint. The boundary roughly follows the division between the Nile and Congo drainage divided.

== History ==
The border first emerged during the Scramble for Africa, a period of intense competition between European powers in the later 19th century for territory and influence in Africa. The process culminated in the Berlin Conference of 1884, in which the European nations concerned agreed upon their respective territorial claims and the rules of engagements going forward. As a result of this France gained control the upper valley of the Niger River (roughly equivalent to the areas of modern Mali and Niger), and also the lands explored by Pierre Savorgnan de Brazza for France in Central Africa (roughly equivalent to modern Gabon and Congo-Brazzaville). From these bases the French explored further into the interior, eventually linking the two areas following expeditions in April 1900 which met at Kousséri in the far north of modern Cameroon. These newly conquered regions were initially ruled as military territories, with the two areas later organised into the federal colonies of French West Africa (Afrique occidentale française, abbreviated AOF) and French Equatorial Africa (Afrique équatoriale française, AEF).

In 1898-99 Britain and France agreed upon their mutual spheres of influence in the northern third of Africa, and the two nations delimited a frontier between AEF and Anglo-Egyptian Sudan (i.e. the modern Chad–Sudan, CAR-Sudan and CAR-South Sudan borders). This was followed by demarcation on the ground by an Anglo-French commission in 1921–23, with the final border being ratified on 21 January 1924.

On 1 January 1956 Anglo-Egyptian Sudan declared independence as the Republic of Sudan; the Central African Republic followed later on 13 August 1960 and the border then became an international frontier between two independent states. Following a referendum, on 9 July 2011 South Sudan declared independence from Sudan, thus significantly shortening the CAR-Sudan border to its current length.

== Settlements near the border ==
=== CAR ===
- Am Dafok

=== Sudan ===
- Abu Jaradil
- Um Dafuq
- Umm Rawq

== Border Crossings ==
- Umm Dafuq

== See also ==
- Central African Republic-Sudan relations
