= Central African Republic–Democratic Republic of the Congo border =

International border

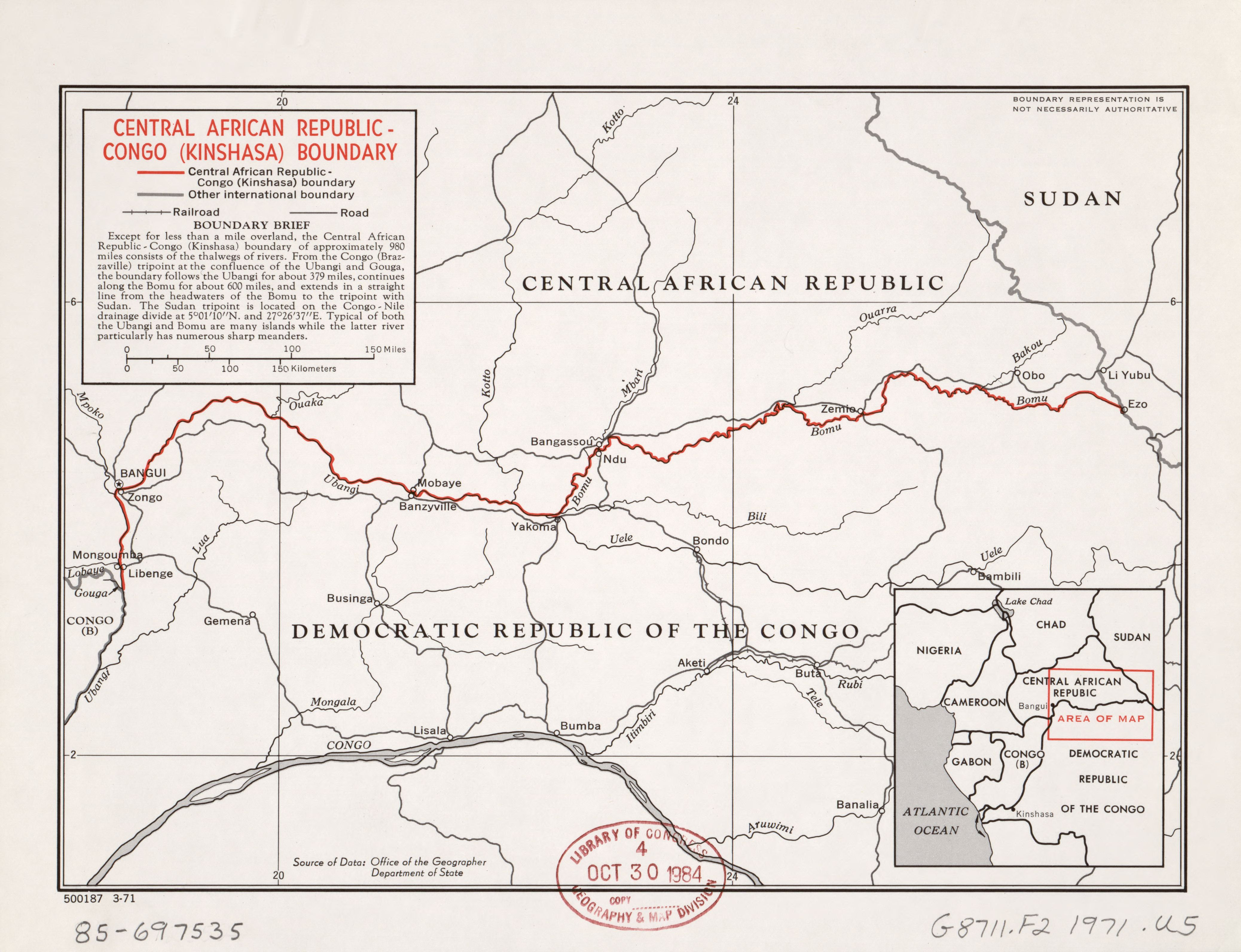
Map of the CAR-DRC border

The Central African Republic–Democratic Republic of the Congo border is 1,747 km (1,086 mi) in length and runs from the tripoint with the Republic of the Congo in the west to the tripoint with South Sudan in the east.

== Description ==
The border starts in the west at the tripoint with the Republic of the Congo at the confluence of the Gouga river and Ubangi river, and then follows the latter for much of its length, before reaching the confluence with the Mbomou River. The border then follows the Mbomou eastwards, with a very short overland section in the far east connecting up with the South Sudanese tripoint.

== History ==
The border first emerged during the Scramble for Africa, a period of intense competition between European powers in the later 19th century for territory and influence in Africa. The process culminated in the Berlin Conference of 1884, in which the European nations concerned agreed upon their respective territorial claims and the rules of engagements going forward. As a result of this France gained control the upper valley of the Niger River (roughly equivalent to the areas of modern Mali and Niger), and also the lands explored by Pierre Savorgnan de Brazza for France in Central Africa (roughly equivalent to modern Gabon and Congo-Brazzaville). The area of the modern DRC was controlled by the Congo Free State, a state held under the personal rule of Belgian King Leopold II, who had sponsored various explorations in the region under the guise of humanitarianism. The boundary between French and Belgian territory was somewhat vaguely delimited at the time of the Conference, utilising the Congo River and then various lines of latitude and longitude. A protocol signed on 29 April 1887 further delimited the boundary as following the Congo river, then the Ubangi river up the 4th parallel north, and then following this parallel eastwards.

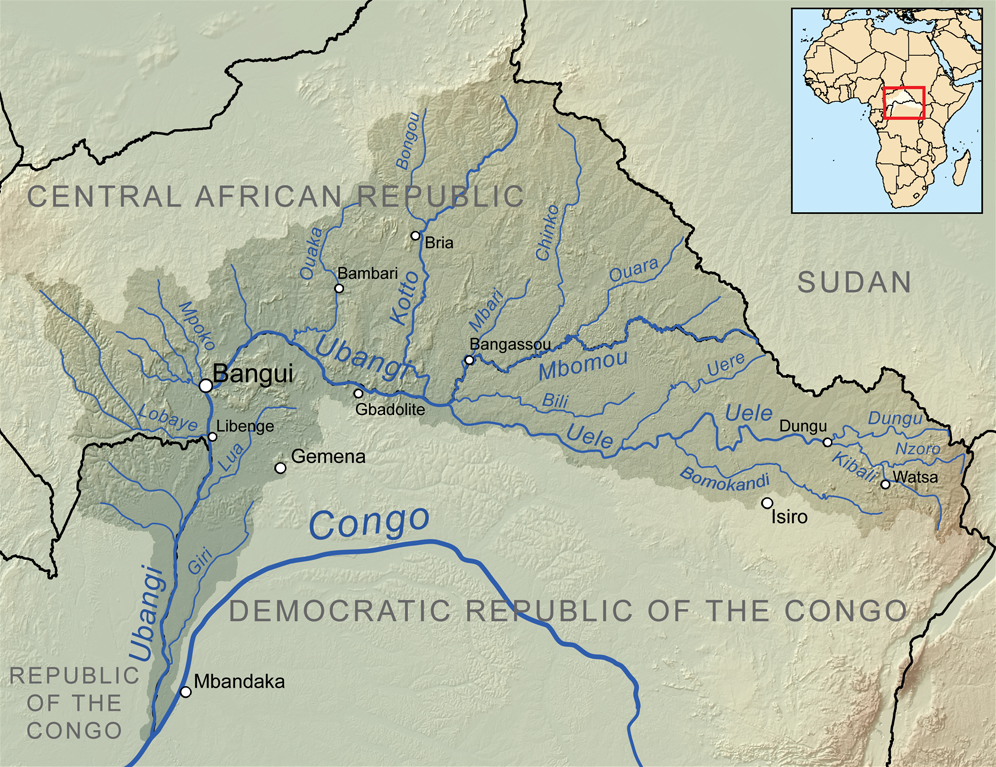
Rivers of the border region

In the following years France explored further into the interior, founding Bangui in 1889, and eventually linking their Central and West African holdings following expeditions in April 1900 which met at Kousséri in the far north of modern Cameroon. These newly conquered regions were initially ruled as military territories, with the two areas later organised into the federal colonies of French West Africa (Afrique occidentale française, abbreviated AOF) and French Equatorial Africa (Afrique équatoriale française, AEF). As a result, the French-Congo Free State boundary was modified to its current position by agreement on 14 August 1894. Administration of the Congo Free State was taken over by the Belgian government in 1908 following controversies engendered by the atrocities committed by Leopold's forces there.

The Belgian Congo gained independence (as the Republic of the Congo, later renamed Democratic Republic of the Congo) on 30 June 1960, followed by the French territory of Ubangi-Shari (as the Central African Republic) on 13 August 1960, and their mutual frontier became an international one between two sovereign states.

Since 2003 the border has been crossed by thousands of Central African refugees fleeing the Central African Republic Bush War and later the Central African Republic Civil War.

== Settlements near the border ==
=== CAR ===
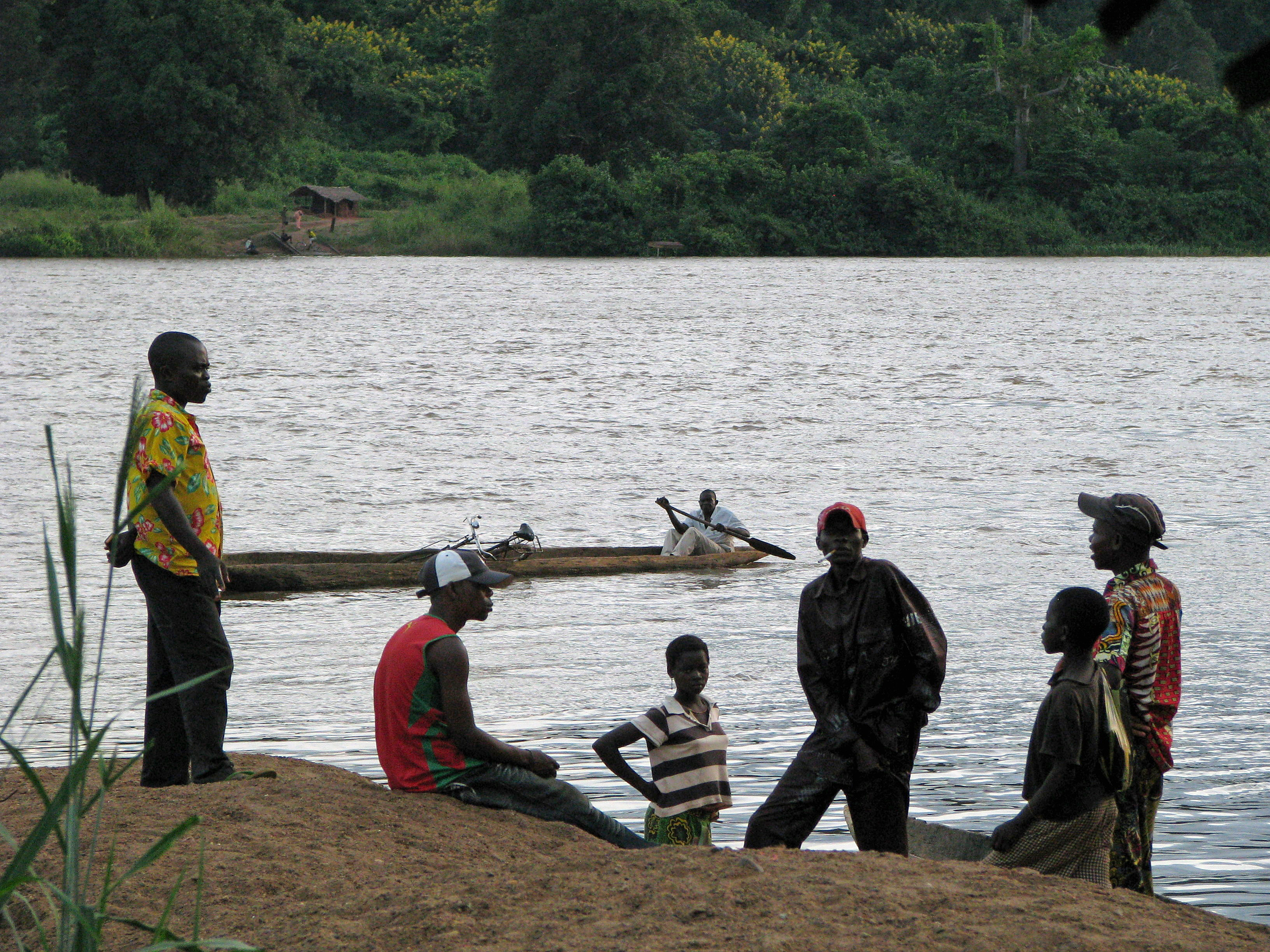
The Mboumou river border

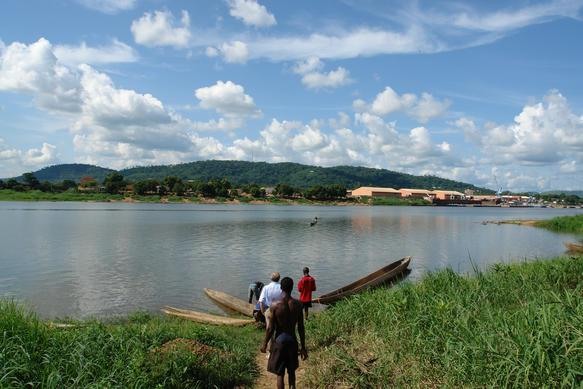
The Ubangi border near Bangui

- Bangui
- Oumba
- Bakéma Dengou
- Mobaye
- Limassa
- Banda
- Ouango
- Malakambo
- Bangassou
- Kouango
- Mongoumba
- Koupia
- Dembia
- Zemio
- Kitessa
- Aminagou
- Panbolinbo

=== DRC ===
- Libenge
- Zongo
- Duma
- Gele
- Bangi
- Dula
- Mobayi-Mbongo
- Yakomo
- Dangobe

== Border crossings ==
The main crossings are at Bangui-Zongo, Mobaye-Mobayi-Mbongo and Bangassou-Ndu.

== See also ==
- Central African Republic-Democratic Republic of the Congo relations
