= Democratic Front of the Central African People =

Anti-government militia in the Central African Republic

- Front démocratique du peuple centrafricain
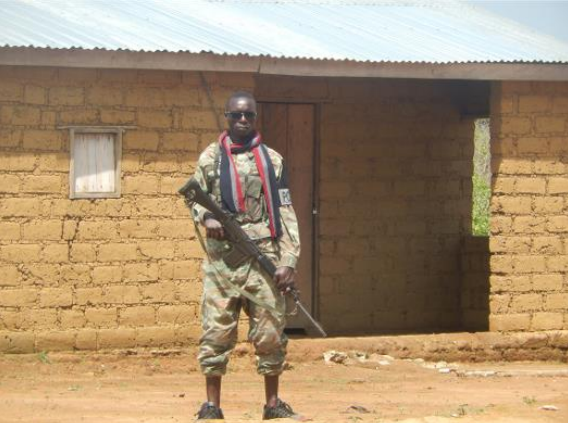
- FDPC fighter in Zoukombo, 2016
- Other name: FDPC
- Leaders: Abdoulaye Miskine (until 2019); André Ringui le Gaillard
- Dates active: 2004–2019
- Headquarters: Nabanza, Ouham (2008); Zoukombo (2016–2019); Am Dafok (2019)
- Active regions: North-central Central African Republic
- Size: 20 (2008); 100 (2016)

The Democratic Front of the Central African People (French: Front démocratique du peuple centrafricain; FDPC) was an anti-government militia in the Central African Republic (CAR). It was one of the major combatants in the CAR Bush War and a member of the Séléka CPSK-CPJP-UFDR alliance of militant groups that overthrew the national government in March 2013.

The FDPC signed a ceasefire with the government on February 2, 2007. This agreement was known as the Sirte Agreement, after the Libyan city where it was signed. It was the earliest of the ceasefires that the government signed individually with each of the three major militias, bringing temporary peace to the country. It controlled a small pocket between Kabo and Moyenne-Sido.

After falling out with Séléka, FDPC leader Abdoulaye Miskine fled across the border into Cameroon and was arrested there in 2013. The FDPC responded by abducting 26 people from both countries, including a Polish priest, in an effort to pressure Cameroon's government to release Miskine. In November 2014, the FDPC released its hostages and Cameroon released Miskine.

On 20 May 2016, FDPC occupied Zoukombo village near the Cameroonian border. FDPC was also present in Abba and near Kabo. At this time it had less than 100 fighters.

On 5 April 2019, MINUSCA captured Zoukombo killing three FDPC fighters where it had previously established a checkpoint. In September 2019 it was reported that FDPC was present in Vakaga prefecture participating in FPRC offensives. After Am Dafok was captured by MLCJ on 14 October Miskine was forced to flee to Sudan. In October Abdoulaye Miskine was arrested in Chad.
