= Central African Republic–Sudan relations =

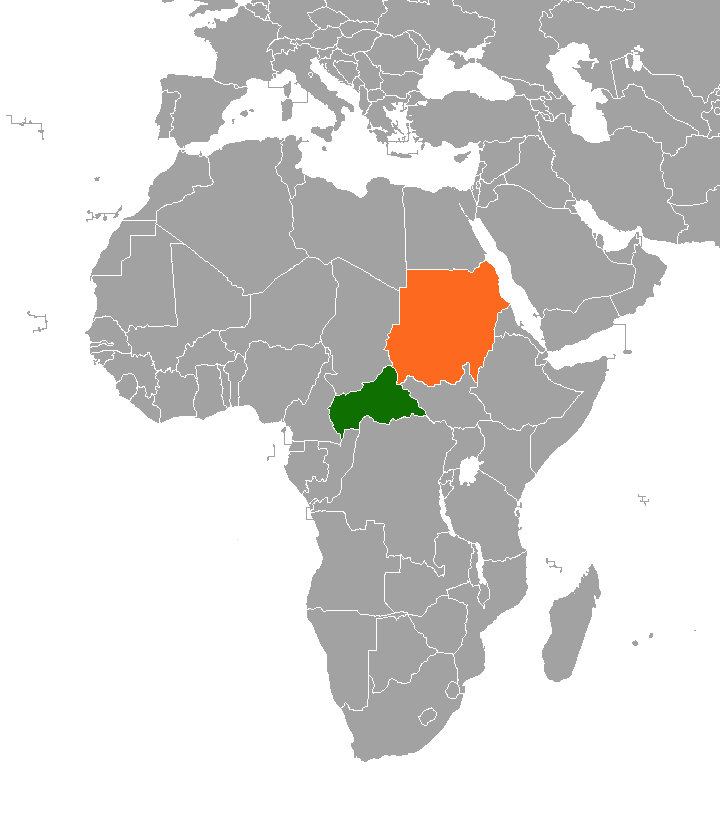

- Central African Republic: Sudan

From the perspective of the government of the Central African Republic (CAR), the major long-term problem in relations with Sudan was penetration of its wide open eastern frontier by cattle raiders and poachers. This border had a certain “Wild West” quality to it as of the early 2000s; neither government had firm control over territory in its their jurisdiction. Some of Sudan's border with the Central African Republic is contiguous to territory that was under the control of South Sudan in 2010. Even when the South Sudan People's Defence Forces (SPLM/A) was at war with the Sudanese government, the conflict did not discourage al-Bashir’s government from engaging actively with the CAR.

Sudan had cordial relations with former CAR president Ange-Félix Patassé, who was overthrown in a military coup by General François Bozizé in March 2003. Sudan initially established good relations with the new leader. The two presidents met on a number of occasions. The CAR, Chad, and Sudan signed joint security agreements in December 2004 to monitor the situation along their borders, prevent infiltration, and combat illegal hunting. The conflict in Darfur contributed to internal problems in the CAR, which accused Sudan in 2006 of trying to destabilize the country. A summit meeting in France early in 2007 involving the presidents of Sudan, the CAR, and Chad resulted in an agreement not to back insurgencies in their respective countries. The UN Security Council established in September 2007 the Mission in the Central African Republic and Chad (MINURCAT) to protect civilians, promote human rights and the rule of law, and promote regional peace. The UN Security Council shut down the mission, as agreed, by the end of 2010.

In the early 1990s, there were as many as 36,000 South Sudanese refugees in the CAR. Nearly all of them returned to South Sudan.

Due to the current Sudanese civil war (2023–present), the government of the CAR has kept its borders open to Sudanese refugees. As of January 2025, a total of 37,089 people have fled from Sudan to the CAR.

== See also ==
- Central African Republic–Sudan border
