= Kitessa =

- Location in Central African Republic
- Coordinates: 5°21′28″N 25°21′38″E
- Country: Central African Republic
- Prefecture: Haut-Mbomou
- Sub-prefecture: Zemio
- Commune: Zemio

Kitessa is a village located in Haut-Mbomou Prefecture, Central African Republic. In 1995, the village had a population of about 300 people.

== History ==
On 29 April 2010, LRA bands attacked Kitessa and killed eight people.

On 18 August 2017, a suspected Peuhl militia raided Kitessa.

In 2020, Kitessa was under the control of UPC and the rebels erected a checkpoint in it.

A clash between UPC and Azande Ani Kpi Gbe ensued in Kitessa on 22 and 23 February 2024, prompting the villagers fled to Zemio. FACA and Wagner clashed with UPC in Kitessa in May 2024, killing four rebels and wounding three.

== Education ==
There is one primary school in the village. The students who want to continue high school have to go to Zemio.

== Healthcare ==
Kitessa has one health post.
