= Lokoti =

- Coordinates: 6.3667°N 14.3333°E
- Country: Cameroon
- Region: Adamawa
- Department: Mbéré
- arrondissement: Meiganga
- Elevation: 3,349 m (10,988 ft)

Population (2005)
  - Total: 1,956

Lokoti is a village in the Mbéré department of the Adamawa Region in Cameroon. The village is crossed by a tar-sealed road.

== Climate ==
The climate is temperate with savannah vegetation.

== Infrastructure ==
There is a high school for general education, a primary school, and a maternal school. The village also possesses a health centre.

== Demographics ==
The population consists of Catholics and Muslims. Lokoti is administrated by a Lamidat. The ethnic groups incled the Mambila and the Dourou people.

== Economy ==
The economy is based on agriculture and motorcycle transport.
