= Central African Republic–Republic of the Congo border =

International border

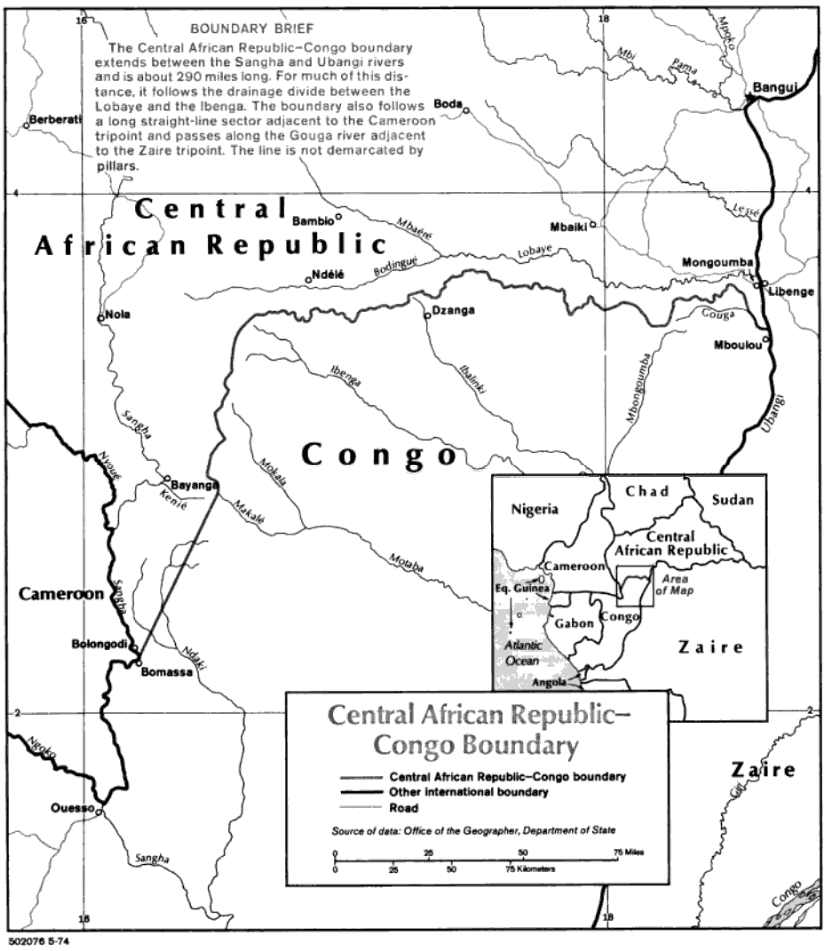
Map of the CAR-Republic of Congo border

The Central African Republic–Republic of the Congo border is 487 km (303 mi) in length and runs from the tripoint with Cameroon in the west to the tripoint with the Democratic Republic of the Congo in the east.

== Description ==
The border starts in the west at the tripoint with Cameroon in the Sangha River, and then proceeds via a straight line overland towards the northwest. It then proceeds via a series of irregular lines to the north, generally following the Sangha-Ubangi drainage divide, before turning a broad arc to the east, and then continuing in that direction broadly following the Ibenga-Bodingué drainage divide. It then follows the Lobaye-Gouga drainage divide up to the Democratic Republic of the Congo tripoint at the confluence of the Gouga and Ubangi.

== History ==
The CAR-Congo boundary underwent several changes in the period 1926-1960; these two maps are from 1937

The border first emerged during the Scramble for Africa, a period of intense competition between European powers in the later 19th century for territory and influence in Africa. The process culminated in the Berlin Conference of 1884, in which the European nations concerned agreed upon their respective territorial claims and the rules of engagements going forward. As a result of this France gained control the upper valley of the Niger River (roughly equivalent to the areas of modern Mali and Niger), and also the lands explored by Pierre Savorgnan de Brazza for France in Central Africa (roughly equivalent to modern Gabon and Congo-Brazzaville). From these bases the French explored further into the interior, eventually linking the two areas following expeditions in April 1900 which met at Kousséri in the far north of modern Cameroon. These newly conquered regions were initially ruled as military territories. By 1903 the areas that now make up Gabon and Congo-Brazzaville (then called Moyen-Congo, or Middle Congo) were united as French Congo (later split), with areas further north organised into Ubangi-Shari (modern Central African Republic) and Chad military territory; the latter two areas were merged from 1906 to 1914 as Ubangi-Shari-Chad. In 1910 the whole region was united as French Equatorial Africa (Afrique équatoriale française, AEF). The internal boundaries of this colony underwent several changes: in 1926 the French transferred the town of Mbaïki and the surrounding area from Congo to Ubangi-Shari, creating a boundary which roughly followed the drainage divide between Ibenga and Lobaye rivers. Further changes occurred in 1929, when Lobaye region was transferred from Moyen-Congo to Ubangi-Shari. In 1937 Haute-Sangha was added to Moyen-Congo. It appears that the border reached its final alignment at some point after the Second World War.

After the Second World War France gradually granted more political rights and representation for its African territories, culminating in the granting of broad internal autonomy to each colony in 1958 within the framework of the French Community. Eventually, in August 1960, both Moyen-Congo (as the Republic of the Congo) and Ubangi-Shari (as the Central African Republic) declared full independence and their mutual frontier thus became an international one between two independent states.

== See also ==
- Central African Republic-Republic of the Congo relations
