= Central African Republic–South Sudan border =

International border

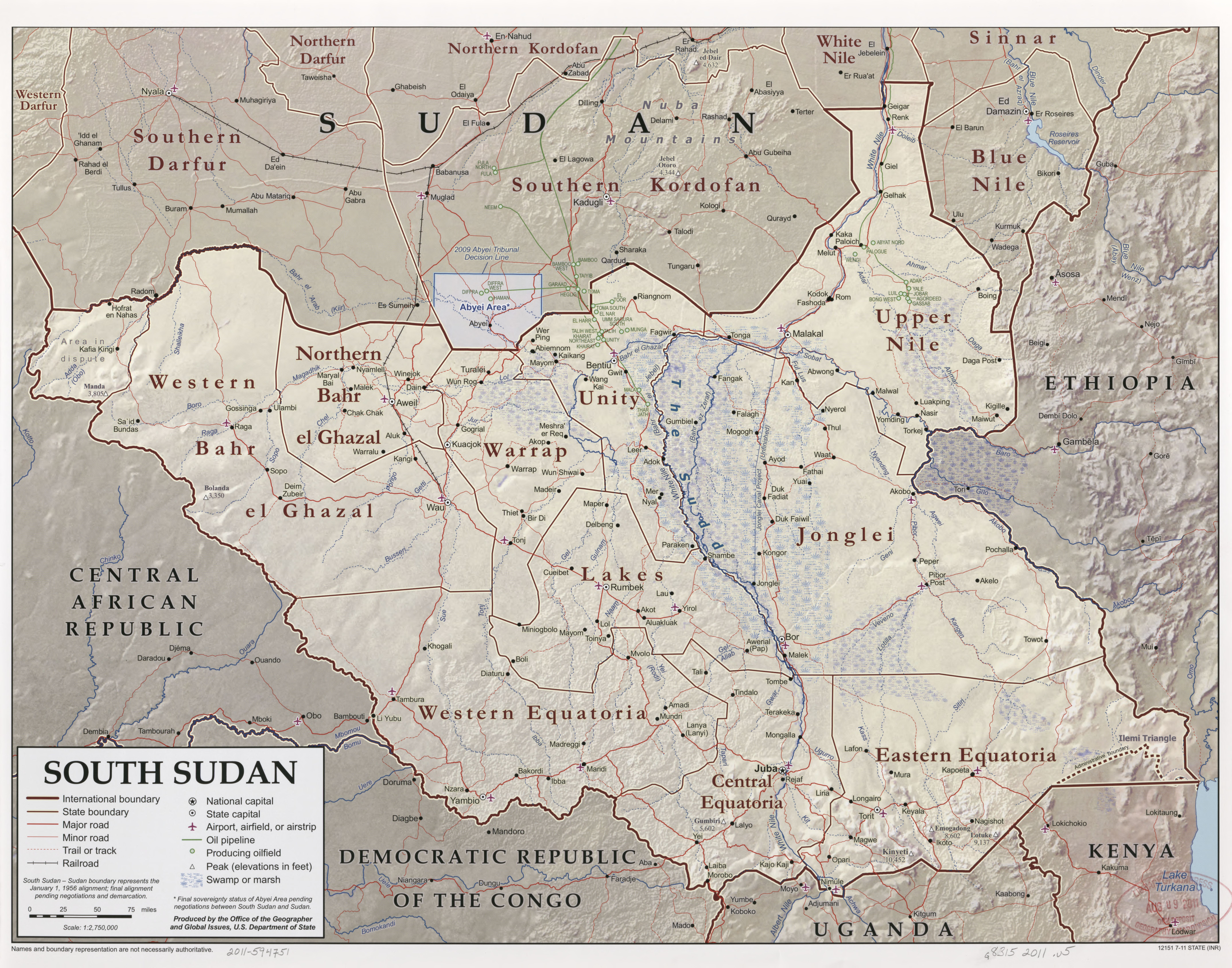
Map of South Sudan, with the Central African Republic to the west

The Central African Republic–South Sudan border is 1,055 kilometres (656 miles) in length and runs from the tripoint with Sudan in the north, to the tripoint with the Democratic Republic of the Congo in the south.

== Description ==
The precise starting point of the border in the north is in dispute, as both Sudan and South Sudan claim the Kafia Kingi region, which is currently under Sudanese administration. Starting at the de facto tripoint, the border proceeds southwards for a short distance, before turning to the south-east. The border then follows a series a very irregular lines overland in southeastwards direction, down to the tripoint with the DRC. The boundary roughly follows the division between the Nile and Congo drainage divide.

== History ==
The border first emerged during the Scramble for Africa, a period of intense competition between European powers in the later 19th century for territory and influence in Africa. The process culminated in the Berlin Conference of 1884, in which the European nations concerned agreed upon their respective territorial claims and the rules of engagements going forward. As a result of this France gained control the upper valley of the Niger River (roughly equivalent to the areas of modern Mali and Niger), and also the lands explored by Pierre Savorgnan de Brazza for France in Central Africa (roughly equivalent to modern Gabon and Congo-Brazzaville). From these bases the French explored further into the interior, eventually linking the two areas following expeditions in April 1900 which met at Kousséri in the far north of modern Cameroon. These newly conquered regions were initially ruled as military territories, with the two areas later organised into the federal colonies of French West Africa (Afrique occidentale française, abbreviated AOF) and French Equatorial Africa (Afrique équatoriale française, AEF).

In 1898-99 Britain and France agreed upon their mutual spheres of influence in northern third of Africa, and the two nations delimited a frontier between AEF and Anglo-Egyptian Sudan (i.e. the modern Chad-Sudan, CAR-Sudan and CAR-South Sudan borders). This was followed by demarcation on the ground by an Anglo-French commission in 1921–23, with the final border being ratified on 21 January 1924.

On 1 January 1956 Anglo-Egyptian Sudan declared independence as the Republic of Sudan; the Central African Republic followed later on 13 August 1960. Following a referendum, on 9 July 2011 South Sudan declared independence from Sudan, and thus inherited the bulk of the former CAR-Sudan border. The border region is remote and poorly policed, providing a safe haven for various rebel groups; it is thought the Joseph Kony of the Lord's Resistance Army may currently be hiding in the border region.

== Settlements near the border ==
=== CAR ===
- Bambouti

=== South Sudan ===
- Source Yubu
- Bariguna
- Ezo

== See also ==
- Central African Republic-South Sudan relations
