= Cameroon–Central African Republic border =

International border

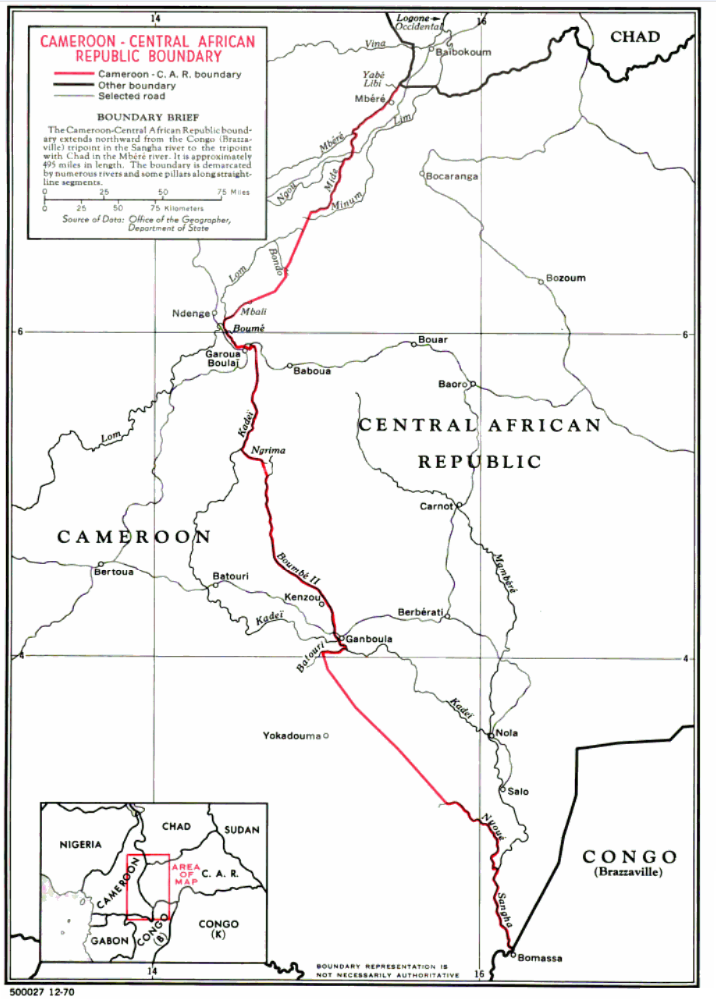
Map of the Cameroon-CAR border

The Cameroon–Central African Republic border is 901 km (560 mi) in length and runs from the tripoint with Chad in the north to the tripoint with the Republic of the Congo in the south.

== Description ==
The border starts in the north at the tripoint with Chad in the Mbéré River, following this river as it flows to the southwest. It continues in this direction, then gradually arcs to the southeast, utilising various rivers (such as the Ngou, Guirma, Kadéï, Boumba, Batouri and Nyoue), with some shorter overland stretches, before reaching the Sangha River. It then follows this river down the tripoint with the Republic of Congo.

== History ==
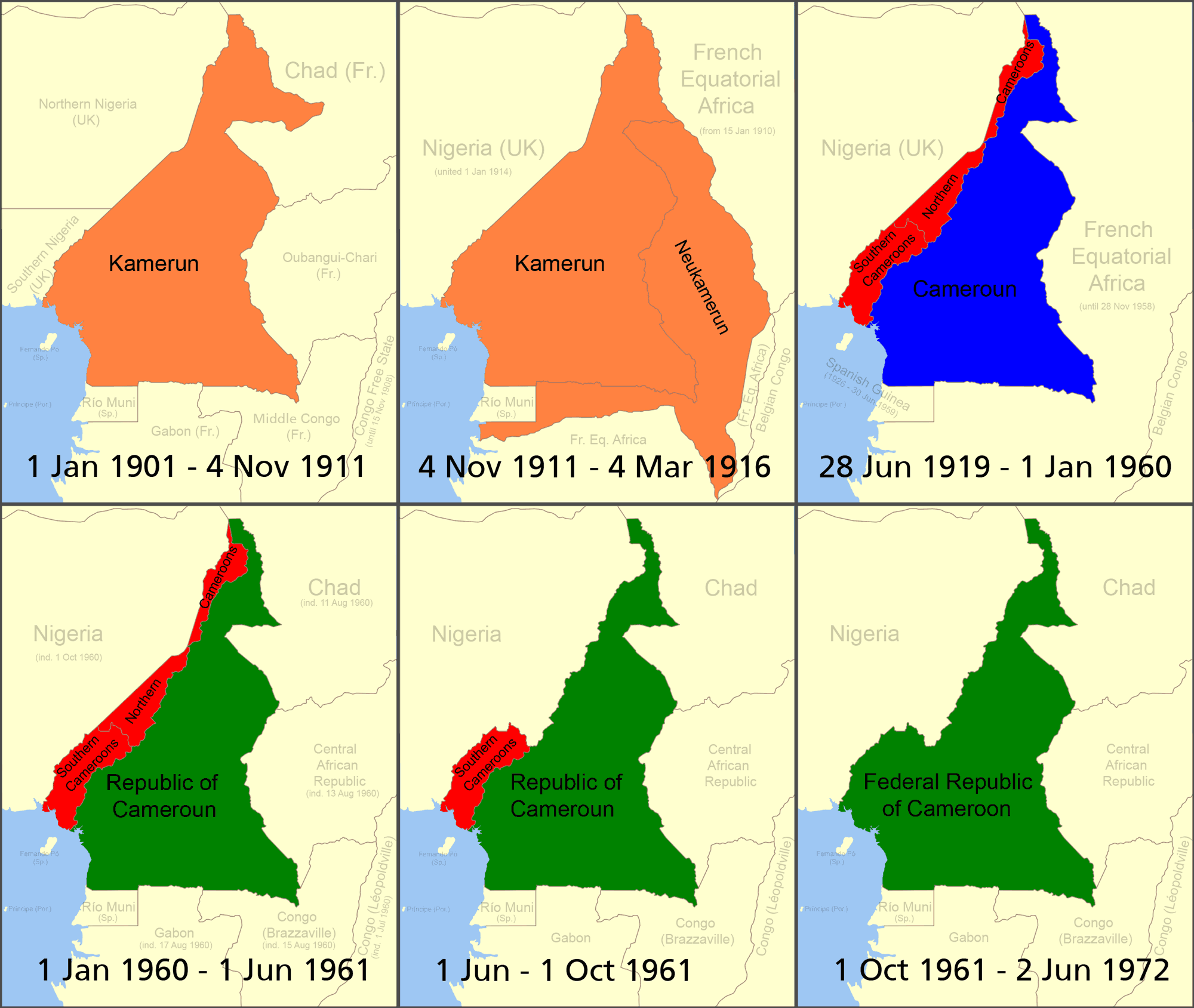
Maps of Cameroon 1901-1972 showing the changes to the border with CAR German Cameroon (Kamerun) British Cameroons French Cameroon (Cameroun) independent Cameroon (Cameroun)

The border first emerged during the Scramble for Africa, a period of intense competition between European powers in the later 19th century for territory and influence in Africa. The process culminated in the Berlin Conference of 1884, in which the European nations concerned agreed upon their respective territorial claims and the rules of engagements going forward. As a result of this France gained control of the upper valley of the Niger River (roughly equivalent to the areas of modern Mali and Niger), and also the lands explored by Pierre Savorgnan de Brazza for France in Central Africa (roughly equivalent to modern Gabon and Congo-Brazzaville). From these bases the French explored further into the interior, eventually linking the two areas following expeditions in April 1900 which met at Kousséri in the far north of modern Cameroon. These newly conquered regions were initially ruled as military territories. By 1903 within the AEF, the areas that now make up Gabon and Congo-Brazzaville (then called Moyen-Congo, or Middle Congo) were united as French Congo (later split), with areas further north organised into Ubangi-Shari (modern CAR) and Chad military territory; the latter two areas were merged in 1906 as Ubangi-Shari-Chad, and then de-merged in 1914. The two regions were later organised into the federal colonies of French West Africa (Afrique occidentale française, abbreviated AOF) and French Equatorial Africa (Afrique équatoriale française, AEF).

Germany had claimed Cameroon (Kamerun) in July 1884. France and Germany established the rough delimitation of their respective spheres of influence in the region in December 1885, with a more precise boundary agreed upon in 1894. A further delimitation occurred on 18 April 1908, which produced the modern Cameroon-CAR border. Following the Agadir Crisis of 1911, France and Germany signed the Treaty of Fez, in which Germany recognised French supremacy in Morocco in return for large territories in Central Africa. The latter were attached to their Cameroon colony as New Cameroon and included much of what is western CAR. When the First World War broke out in 1914, Britain and France invaded Cameroon and eventually defeated the Germans in 1916. Following the defeat of Germany in Europe in 1918-19 all of the areas ceded to Germany in 1911 were restored to France, thus finalising what are now the Cameroon's modern borders with Gabon, Congo-Brazzaville, CAR and Chad. On 22 June 1922 Cameroon became a League of Nations mandate, with the vast majority of the colony going to France, and smaller areas along the Nigerian border in the west to Britain. This mandate/trusteeship arrangement was affirmed by the UN in 1946.

France gradually granted more political rights and representation for its African colonies, culminating in the granting of broad internal autonomy to each colony in 1958 within the framework of the French Community. Eventually, in January 1960 France granted Cameroon full independence, followed by Ubangi-Shari (as the Central African Republic) in August that year, and their mutual frontier became an international one between two independent states.

Since 2003 the border has been crossed by thousands of Central African refugees fleeing the Central African Republic Bush War and later the Central African Republic Civil War.

== Settlements near the border ==
=== Cameroon ===
- Dompta
- Yérombondé
- Kombo-Laka
- Gbatoua
- Koumboul
- Garoua-Boulaï
- Nambona
- Kentzou
- Ndélélé
- Ngoundi
- Gbiti

=== CAR ===
- Béloko
- Mbéré
- Koundé
- Ardo Djaloré
- Bimbélou
- Noufou
- Gamboula
- Bandjiforo
- Banga-Boumbé
- Cantonnier

== Border crossings ==
The two main border crossings are at Kenzou-Gamboula and Garoua-Boulaï.
