= Time in the Central African Republic =

- Time zone: West Africa Time
- Initials: WAT
- UTC offset: UTC+01:00

Daylight saving time
- DST not observed

tz database
- Africa/Bangui

The Central African Republic (CAR) observes a single time zone year-round, denoted as West Africa Time (WAT; UTC+01:00).

== IANA time zone database ==
In the IANA time zone database, the Central African Republic is given one zone in the file zone.tab—Africa/Bangui. "CF" refers to the country's ISO 3166-1 alpha-2 country code. Data for the Central African Republic directly from zone.tab of the IANA time zone database; columns marked with * are the columns from zone.tab itself:

| c.c.* | coordinates* | TZ* | Comments | UTC offset | DST |
|---|---|---|---|---|---|
| CF | +0422+01835 | Africa/Bangui | | +01:00 | +01:00 |

== See also ==
- Time in Africa
- List of time zones by country
