= Um Dafuq =

Um Dafuq أم دافوق
- Town
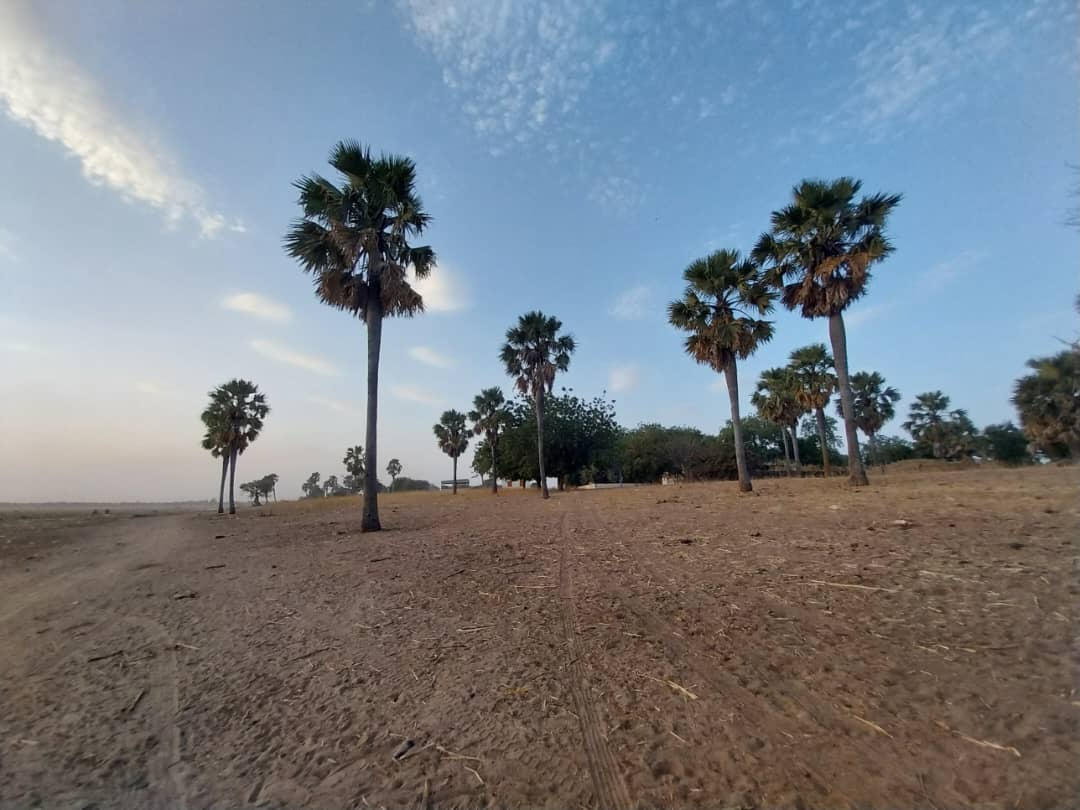
- Palmyra Palm Trees in Um Dafuq

- Location of Um Dafuq in Sudan
- Coordinates: 10°28′50″N 23°18′33″E
- Country: Sudan
- State: South Darfur
- Control: Rapid Support Forces

Population (2020 estimation)
  - Total: 6,700
- Time zone: UTC+2 (CAT)

Um Dafuq (Arabic: أم دافوق), also spelled Um Dafouk, Um Dafok, and Um Dafog, is a town located across the Central African Republic–Sudan border in South Darfur. The town holds economic and commercial importance. It is the birthplace of Abdallahi ibn Muhammad.

== History ==
On 17 April 2012, SLM/A captured Um Dafuq. They seized weapons and ammunition from the military bases in the town. Due to the attack, some civilians fled to the Central African Republic while others sought refuge in Amarok, Sinatah, and Al Masid. Sudanese Armed Forces recaptured the town from rebels on 19 April 2012.

In May 2015, the town faced a water shortage due to the closure of a water reservoir.

Tribal fighting between Arab Taisha and Fallata broke out in Um Dafuq on 5 and 6 June 2021, resulting 36 people being killed and 32 being wounded. Responding to this situation, the government deployed its military forces to the town to resolve the conflict. Peace and order were restored in Um Dafuq on 7 June.

A protest broke out in Um Dafuq on 13 March 2022 in response to the bomb explosion in a social event two days before that killed five people and left 27 wounded. The protesters demanded that the government provide security to the town.

Floods swept the town on 13 August 2022 due to the collapse of Um Dafuq Dam, affecting 500 families.

On 24 December 2022, the Rapid Support Forces (RSF) killed three people and wounded a woman in a market in Um Dafuq. The following day, residents of the town held a demonstration to protest the incident and demanded that the authorities arrest the perpetrators and expel the RSF from Um Dafuq.

The 2023 Sudan conflict saw thousands of refugees fleeing across the border into neighboring Am Dafok in the Central African Republic As of 17 May 2023, Um Dafuq was under the control of Rapid Support Forces with the help of Wagner PMC. The RSF reportedly captured the Sudanese Armed Forces town garrison on 13 June 2023.

== Economy ==
The town is a place where poachers sold ivory. There is a custom post in the town.

== Infrastructure ==
The town has a stadium. In January 2023, Hemedti promised that Um Dafuq Stadium would be rehabilitated.

== Gallery ==
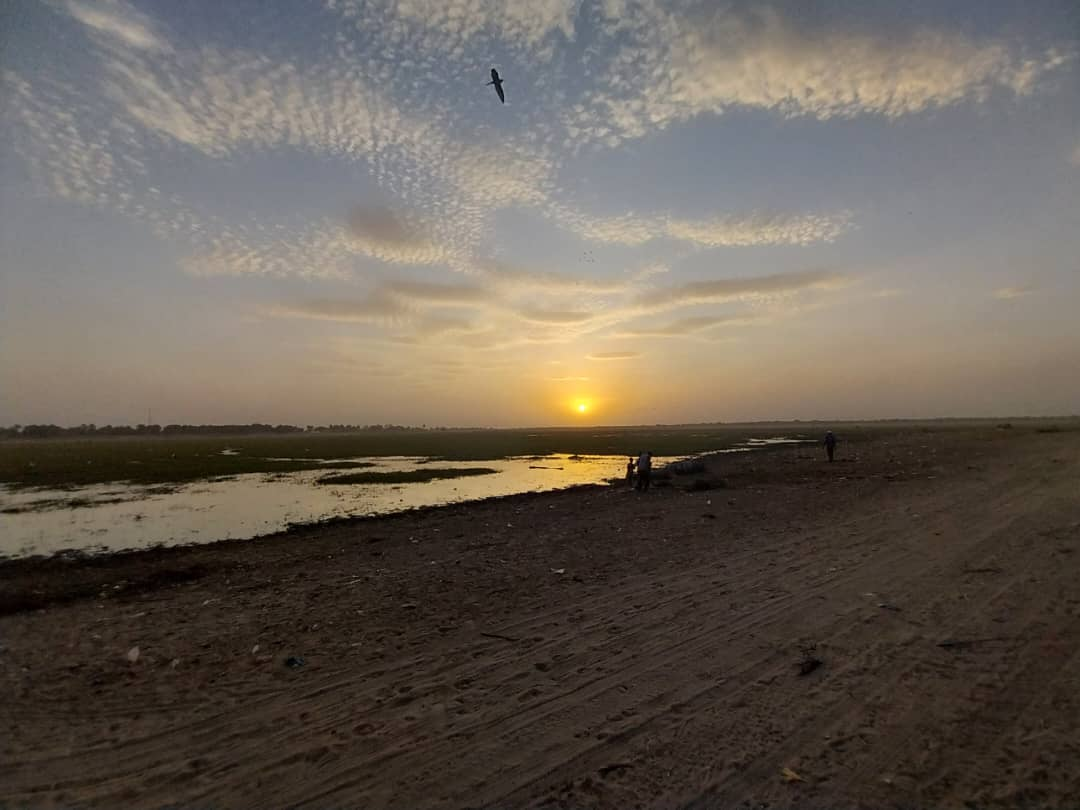
Sunset in Um Dafuq Canal

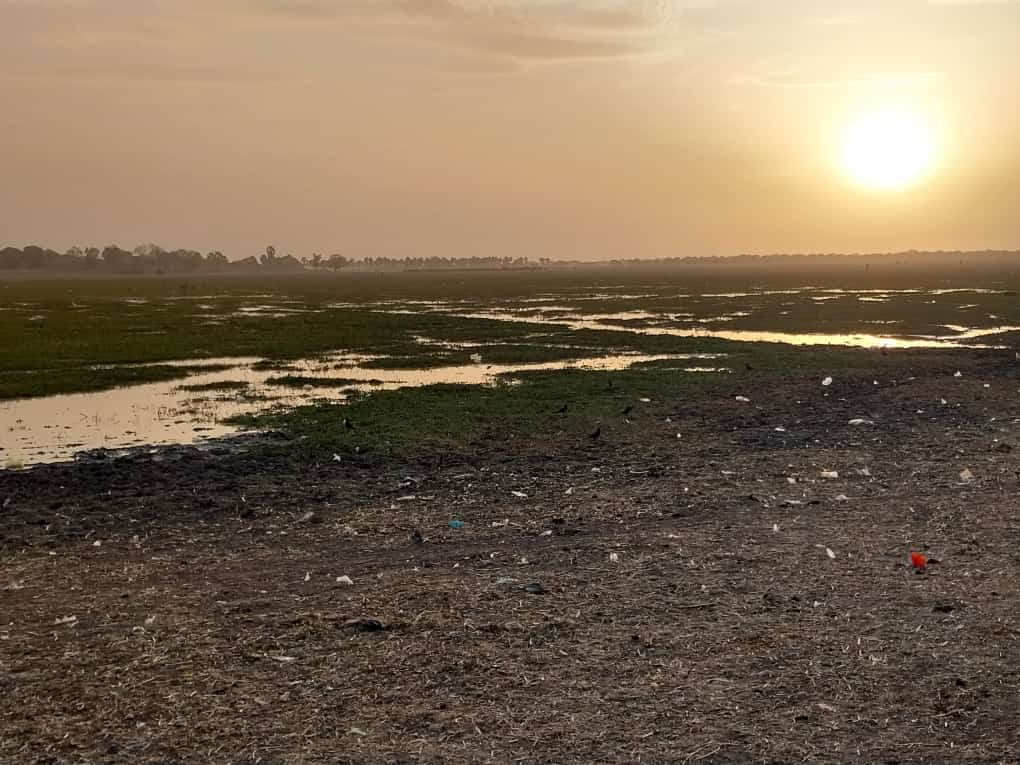
Sunrise in Um Dafuq
