= Baboua, Cameroon =

Baboua
- Location within Cameroon
- Coordinates: 6°59′N 14°15′E
- Country: Cameroon
- Region: Adamawa
- Department: Vina

Population (2005)
  - Total: 846

Baboua is a village in the commune of Belel in the Adamawa Region of Cameroon.

== Population ==
In 1967, Baboua contained 523 people, principally Fula people.

In the 2005 census, 846 people were counted there.

== Infrastructure ==
Baboua has a public school.

== Bibliography ==
- Jean Boutrais, 1993, Peuples et cultures de l'Adamaoua (Cameroun) : actes du colloque de Ngaoundéré du 14 au 16 janvier 1992, Paris : Éd. de l'ORSTOM u.a.
- Dictionnaire des villages de l'Adamaoua, ONAREST, Yaoundé, October 1974, 133 p.
