= Am Dafok =

- Town
- Suis Dafok
- Location in the Central African Republic
- Coordinates: 10°27′56″N 23°18′3″E
- Country: Central African Republic
- Prefecture: Vakaga
- Sub-prefecture: Am Dafok

Government
  - Sub-Prefect: Abdel Kader Ramadane

Population (2020)
  - Total: 4,286
- Time zone: UTC+1

Am Dafok, also spelt Am Dafock, is a Sub-Prefecture and town in the Vakaga prefecture of Central African Republic (CAR). The town sits on the CAR side of the border with Sudan; on the Sudanese side of the border lies Um Dafuq in the state of South Darfur.

According to the 2003 census, Am Dafok has a population of 2,915, however, as of 2023, the village is home to thousands of refugees fleeing from the Central African Republic Civil War and the Sudan conflict.

== History ==
In 1962, Am Dafok had a population of 338 people. Following the independence of South Sudan in 2011, the road that passes through Am Dafok became the only remaining CAR–Sudan border crossing.

=== Conflict ===
Vakaga Prefecture, where Am Dafok is located, has seen significant fighting as part of the Central African Republic Civil War.

Forces for the Unification of the Central African Republic (FURCA) rebels attacked Am Dafok on 29 September 2008, looting the town. During the attack, the residents fled to the bush. After ransacking the town, FURCA retreated.

On 14 October 2019 Am Dafok was captured by the Movement of Central African Liberators for Justice (MLCJ). On 16 December it was recaptured by the Popular Front for the Rebirth of Central African Republic (FPRC).

Armed Misseriya elements have a strong presence in Am Dafok. According to a 2021 report from the United Nations Security Council (UNSC), Misseriya forces engage in illegal taxation in Am Dafok. On 3 February 2021, Misseriya forces attacked a humanitarian convoy in Am Dafok. Around that time, a MINUSCA field mission found Misseriya forces had grown their control along the border with Sudan. Near to Am Dafok, and close to the Sudanese border, armed Misseriya elements attacked a patrol by the national defence forces on 16 April. The attack, in nearby Am-Sissia, killed three people and injured four others. On 12 May, soldiers from the national defense forces stationed in Am Dafok left for Birao, following persistent threats from local militias. That evening, their convoy was ambushed in an attack that injured two people. A UNSC presumed the attack was conducted by armed Misseriya elements near Dongore.

In the weeks following the outbreak of the 2023 Sudan conflict, nearly 10,000 people fled from Sudan into Am Dafok. On 30 June 2026, Alliance for a Patriotic Start (ASP) rebels captured Am Dafok. FACA and Wagner recaptured the town on 5 June.

== Geography ==
The small settlement is located within the border of the African Grassland and the Sahara Desert and is in a Sub-Tropic zone of the continent. Am Dafok lies in a flood-prone area, and experiences rainy season during summer months.

Vakaga Prefecture, where Am Dafok is located.

== Education ==
There are two schools in the village. One of the schools was burned during the civil war.

== Healthcare ==
Am Dafok has one health center.
