= Mont Ngaoui =

Highest point in the Central African Republic

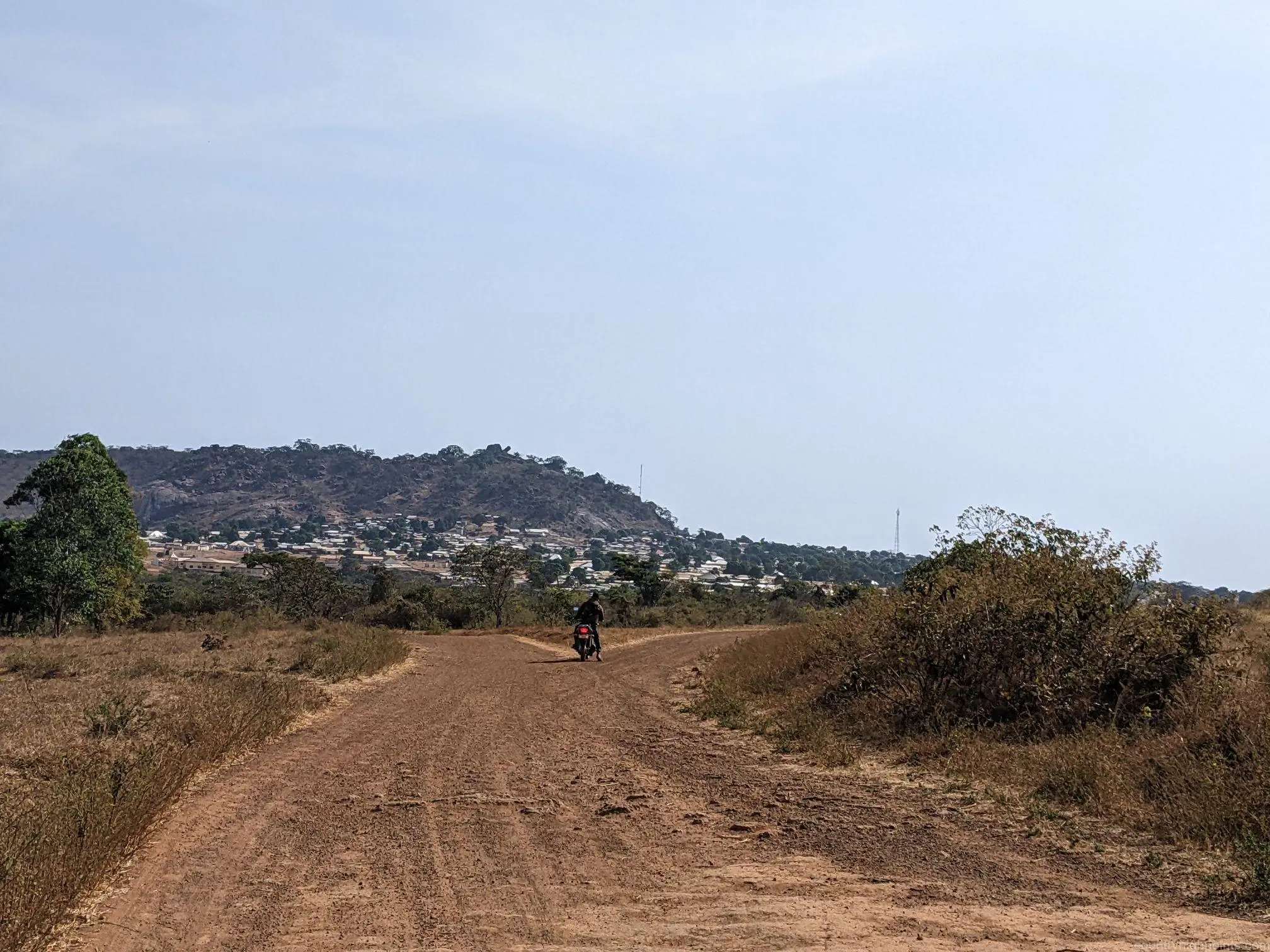
- Mont Ngaoui in 2022

Highest point
- Elevation: 1,410 m (4,630 ft)
- Listing: Country high point
- Coordinates: 6°45′05″N 14°57′35″E

Geography
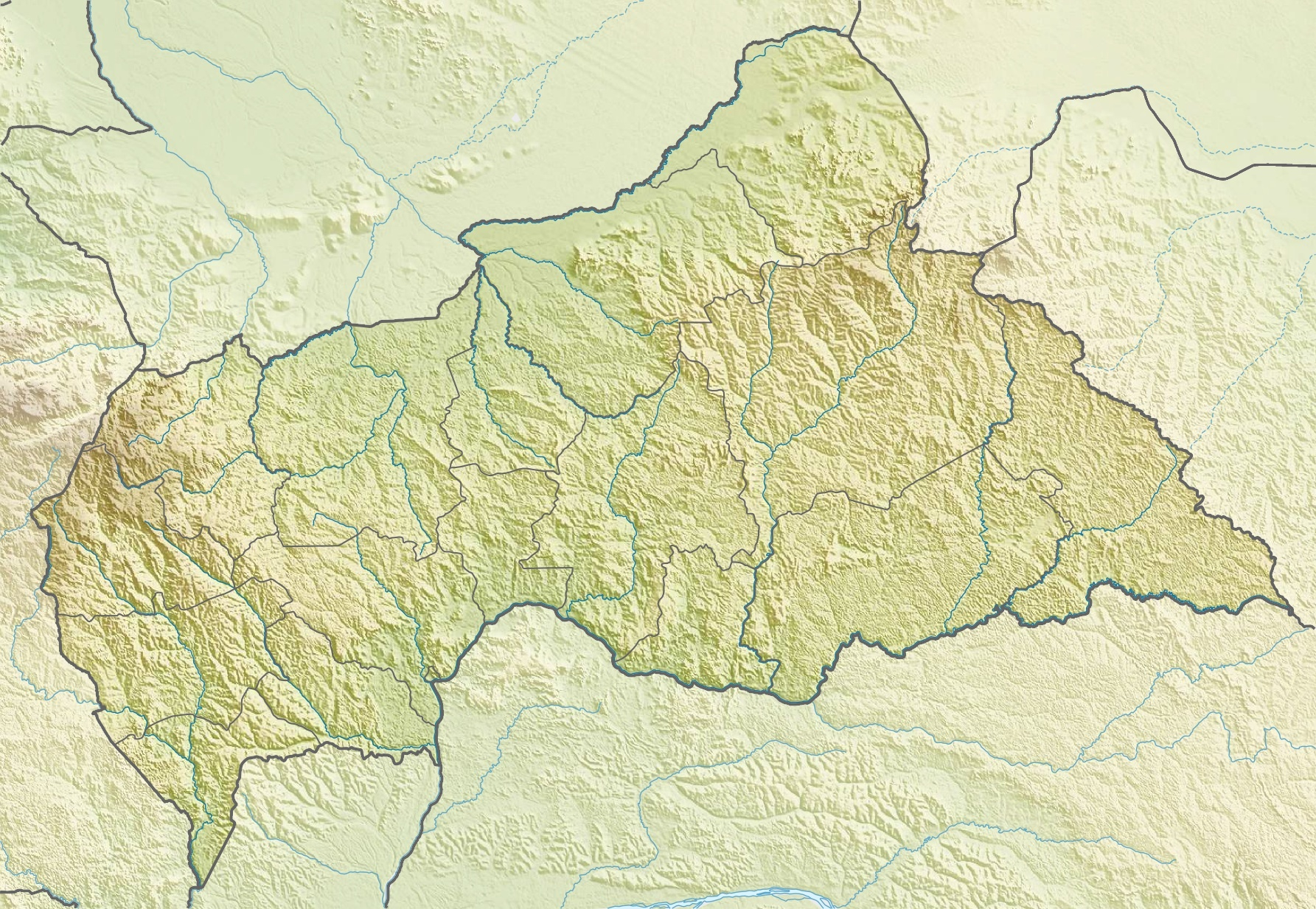
- Location within Central African Republic
- Location: Central African Republic / Cameroon

Mont Ngaoui is the highest mountain in the Central African Republic. It is located on the border with Cameroon and has a summit elevation of 1,410 metres (4,626 ft).
