= Zaraguina =

Subset of African gang

Zaraguinas (French: Coupeurs de route, lit. 'Road cutters') are armed gangs that attack motorists on roads, primarily found in sub-Saharan Africa. They often engage in theft, murder, and rape, and often kidnap to generate funds. They are sometimes made up of fighters that were demobilized following coups & rebellions, and engage in the activity as a vocation.

== Etymology ==
The word Zaraguina might come from the Shuwa Arabic word zarâg, a dark indigo fabric, which was presumably worn by members of the gangs.

== Central African Republic ==
In the Central African Republic, the origin of the zaraguinas, many were former rebels who helped President François Bozizé come to power during his 2003 coup. Many are of Chadian origin. They grew to control large portions of the country starting in the early 2000s, and resulted in the displacement of over 100,000 people due to unsafe living conditions and lack of government access to zaraguina-controlled land. They spread rapidly due to governmental inefficacy in its ability to respond to military threats.

They operate mostly in the border areas, including those of Cameroon, Sudan, and Chad. taking advantage of poorly organized border authority, and lack of prosecution of illegal border crossings. Many members of these gangs in the area allegedly originated in Chad and Darfur and came across the border in search of resources. The Chadian and Sudanese governments have accused each other of supporting said gangs.

Foreign traders are often victims of violence by Zaraguinas for the purpose of generating funds for the gangs. Fulani herders are common targets of zaraguinas for the same reason, due to their valuable cattle herds which can be sold for money or used as sources of food. The Fulani, in response, organized themselves and created armies of archers to combat the gangs.

== Cameroon & Chad ==
Zaraguinas began spilling over in large numbers to Cameroon in the 1990s, during attempts by Ange-Félix Patassé, the then-president of The CAR, to eradicate the gangs. The gangs grew despite the opposition, and took over large chunks of the border that Cameroon shared with the CAR. After conquering the border, they expanded until they reached the Far North Region, on the border with Chad and Nigeria

Many IDPs from the conflict in CAR in the 2000s became refugees in Maya, a border town in Chad's Mandoul Region. They were later transferred to Dembo in Cameroon.

== West Africa ==
Some gangs that originated in Central Africa have migrated as far as Niger and Nigeria, and perpetrate similar acts of crime.
