= Abba, Central African Republic =

Abba
- sub-prefectures
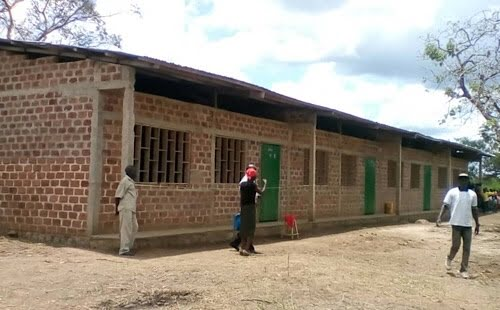

- Location in Central African Republic
- Country: Central African Republic

Government
  - Sub-prefect: Ousmane Biri-Mazou

Abba is a sub-prefecture of Nana-Mambéré in the Central African Republic.

== History ==
In May 2002, Abba became the capital of the fourth sub-prefecture of Nana-Mambéré following the dismemberment of the sub-prefecture of Baboua . On 19 August 2020 the rebel groups Return, Reclamation, Rehabilitation reportedly moved its headquarters there. On 5 March 2021 Abba was recaptured by government forces.

== Education ==
The municipality has two public schools in Abo-Boguirma and Abba and four private schools in Sagani, Lamy-Bony, Camp Café and Ndoké.
