= Return, Reclamation, Rehabilitation =

Former rebel group in the Central African Republic

- Retour, Réclamation et Réhabilitation
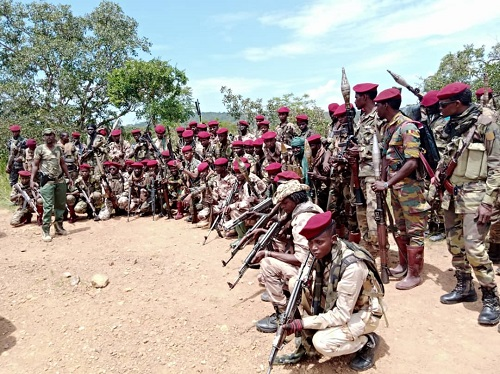
- 3R fighters, 2021
- President: Bi Sidi Souleymane (2015–2020) †; Ramadhane Abdlekader (2021–2025) (surrendered)
- Dates active: December 2015 – 10 July 2025
- Headquarters: Koui (2015–21); Abba (2020); Besson (2021–2025)
- Active regions: Northwestern part of Central African Republic
- Size: 1,700+ (Ouham)
- Part of: Coalition of Patriots for Change (2020–2025)
- Website: Retour Réclamation Réhabilitation

Territories under control of 3R

Return, Reclamation, Rehabilitation (abbreviated 3R, French: Retour, Réclamation et Réhabilitation) was a rebel group in the northwestern part of Central African Republic. The group was formed in December 2015 to protect Fulani herders from Anti-balaka militia attacks. The group has launched attacks on numerous towns, killed unarmed civilians and UN peacekeepers, and carried out several kidnappings. Their former leader, Sidiki Abass, was sanctioned in 2020 by the United States government, and members of the group have been sentenced by the Central African Republic's Special Criminal Court.

== History ==
The group were initially restricted to the Ouham-Pendé prefecture. In 2016, they captured the towns of De Gaulle and Niem, killing at least 17 civilians in the process. Their original enemy was the rebel group Anti-balaka, from whom they captured the village of Bocaranga in 2017 before transferring it to the Central African Armed Forces in January 2019. 3R began to escalate their operations later in 2019. They killed 46 unarmed civilians in one attack and ambushed a UN peacekeeper and two others in another. They took control of Baboua on 1 May 2020, but withdrew four days later. Less than two weeks later, they defeated local gendarmerie forces and seized Besson and Koundé, and then took control of Koundjili before the end of the month, forcing the inhabitants into the bush. On 6 June, 3R withdrew from the Central African peace agreement.

Following the 3R withdrawal, United Nations MINUSCA forces began to counterattack. Bangladeshi paratroopers recaptured Niem (22 July), then Besson (28 July), and then Koui (17 August). Following this, 3R were forced to move their headquarters to Abba. They were able to attack a village near Bocaranga on 19 July, kidnapping 40 people and stealing 50 million Central African francs. Over the course of September and October, they captured several villages near Paou as well as the towns of Boguila and Nana-Bakassa, and also kidnapped three policemen. Additionally, 3R captured a bridge near Bocaranga and laid landmines, establishing a checkpoint and demanding payment for use of the bridge. By 2 October, Rwandan peacekeepers had removed the landmines and checkpoint. On 5 December, 3R freed three of their hostages after negotiations with MINUSCA.

3R banned voter registration for the 2020 Central African general election from taking place in Koui and Ngaoundaye. On 17 December 2020, 3R joined the Coalition of Patriots for Change, an alliance of various rebel groups.

A peace agreement was concluded on 19 April 2025, between the Central African government and the armed groups 3R and UPC. They were officially dissolved on 10 July 2025, during a ceremony held in Bangui.

=== Responses ===
Sidiki Abass, the leader of 3R, was sanctioned by the United States government under Executive Order 13667 and listed in the Specially Designated Nationals and Blocked Persons List. According to the United Nations' sources, Abass was killed in action on 18 December 2020, although 3R later claimed that he died in March 2021 as a result of the wounds he sustained in November 2020.

The Special Criminal Court (SPC) for the Central African Republic delivered its first verdict on 3R in October 2022. This court, operational since 2018 and empowered to try crimes committed since 2003, sentenced three members of 3R who were accused of killing 46 civilians in villages in the northwest region of the Central African Republic.

== Organization ==
According to the June 2025 United Nations report, the 3R's organizational structure as it follows:

- "General" Ramadhane Abdlekader (Sembé Bobbo) – President of 3R
  - Political wing
    - Ismaël Yassine – Political Advisor
    - Hamadou Ramandou – Political Coordinator
    - Dougou – Economical Advisor
    - Ahmadou Ali – Financial Advisor
  - Operational wing
    - "General" Dobordje Goska – Chief of Staff
      - "General" Abakar – Advisor
      - "Colonel" Ardo Abba – Chief of Operations
      - Nana-Mambéré prefecture forces
        - "Colonel" Kamis – Niem/Yelewa area
        - "Major" Umair – Bouar area
      - Mambéré-Kadéï prefecture forces
        - "Colonel" Adamou – Dilapoko area
        - "Colonel" Djibrila – Noufou area
      - Ouham-Pendé prefecture forces
        - Idriss – Koui area
        - "General" Ali – Bocaranga area
