= Baboua, Central African Republic =

Baboua
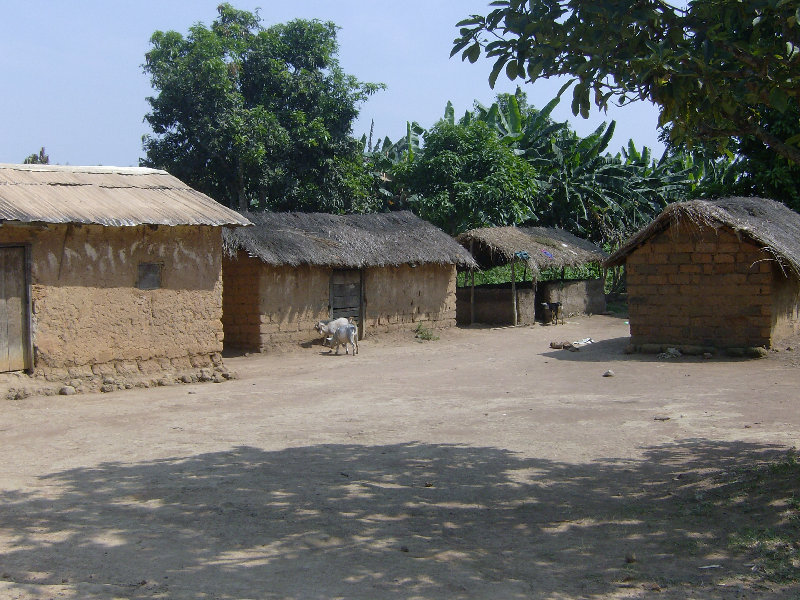

- Location within Central African Republic
- Coordinates: 5°47′N 14°49′E
- Country: Central African Republic
- Prefecture: Nana-Mambéré

Government
  - Sub-Prefect: Norbert Niende
- Elevation: 713 m (2,339 ft)

Population
  - Total: 16,000

Baboua is a town and an administrative area (sub-prefecture) located within the prefecture of Nana-Mambéré in the Central African Republic (CAR), approximately 550 kilometres (340 mi) north-west of Bangui, the nation's capital. The town is located on the CAR's border with Cameroon, and is across the border from the Cameroonian town of Garoua-Boulaï. Baboua is home to the Evangelical Lutheran Seminary and Lutheran Bible School. Tongo Lutheran Church is also located in Baboua.

== History ==
Since around 2013 Baboua area had been under control of FDPC armed group. On 16 July 2015 multiple people including major, sub-prefect and priest were kidnapped by FDPC in Baboua. They were released in July 2016. In May 2017 it was reported that Baboua was under control of security forces.

On 1 May 2020 3R rebel group took control of Baboua. They withdrew on 5 May. On 21 December 2020 Baboua was captured by rebels from Coalition of Patriots for Change. It was recaptured by government forces on 10 February 2021.

== Schools ==
In Baboua there are at least 4 levels of schooling: preschool, elementary, bible school, and seminary. Over half of the children in the town are not enrolled in school.

All schools in Baboua are affiliated with the Evangelical Lutheran Church. Both Christian and Muslim students attend the schools.

At the Lutheran Bible School, students can study the Bible, human rights, agriculture, and health.

== Festivals ==
There is an annual parade in Baboua to celebrate CAR's independence from France.
