= Nana-Mambéré =

Prefecture of the Central African Republic

Coordinates: 5°30′N 15°30′E

- Prefecture
- Nana-Mambéré in the Central African Republic

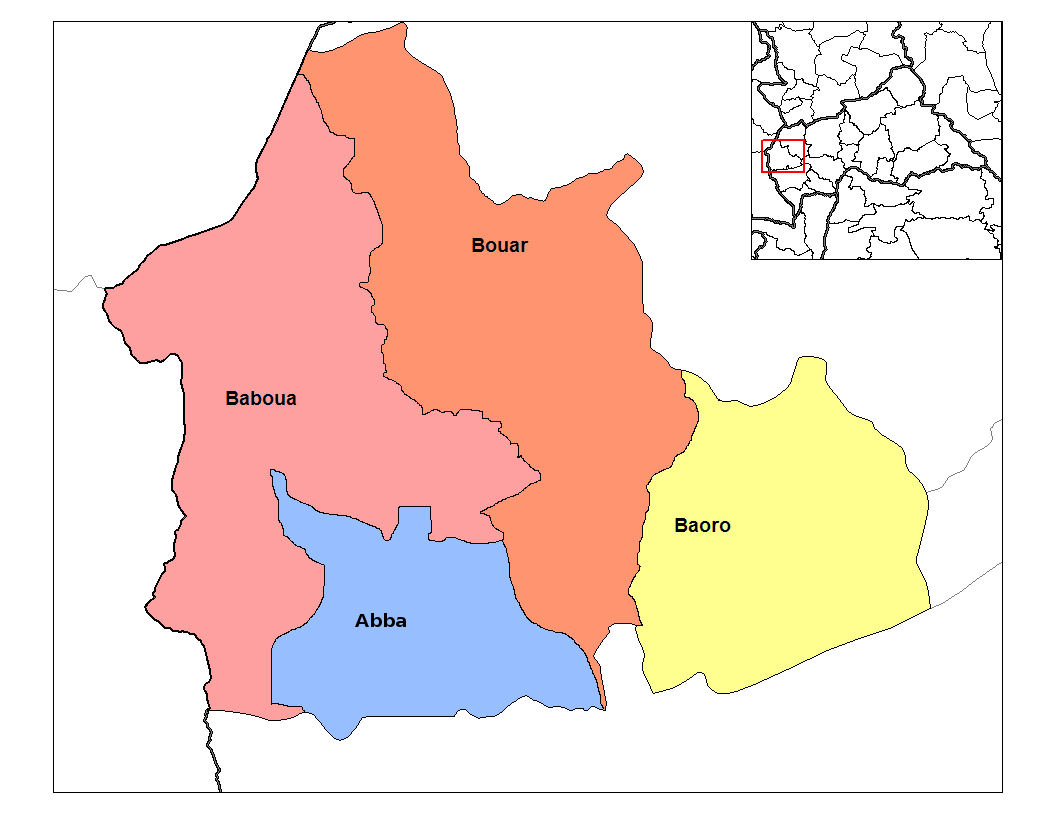
- Sub-prefectures of Nana-Mambéré
- Country: Central African Republic
- Capital: Bouar

Government
  - Prefect: Rita Mirabelle Saravenda
  - Deputy Prefect: Aimé Yakété

Area
  - Total: 26,600 km^{2} (10,300 sq mi)

Population (2003 census)
  - Total: 233,666
  - Estimate (2024 estimation): 371,863

Nana-Mambéré is one of the 20 prefectures of the Central African Republic. It covers an area of 26,600 km^{2} and has a population of 233,666 (2003 census). In 2024, official estimates suggest the population reached 371,863 inhabitants.

The capital is Bouar. It was part of Kamerun when it was a German colony between 1884 and 1916. Other locations in Nana-Mambéré are Abba, Baboua, Gallo and Yanoye. Bouar, the main city of Nana-Mambéré, serves as the headquarters of the Evangelical Lutheran Church for the Central African Republic. The church's seminary and biblical school are situated in Baboua.

== Sub-prefectures ==
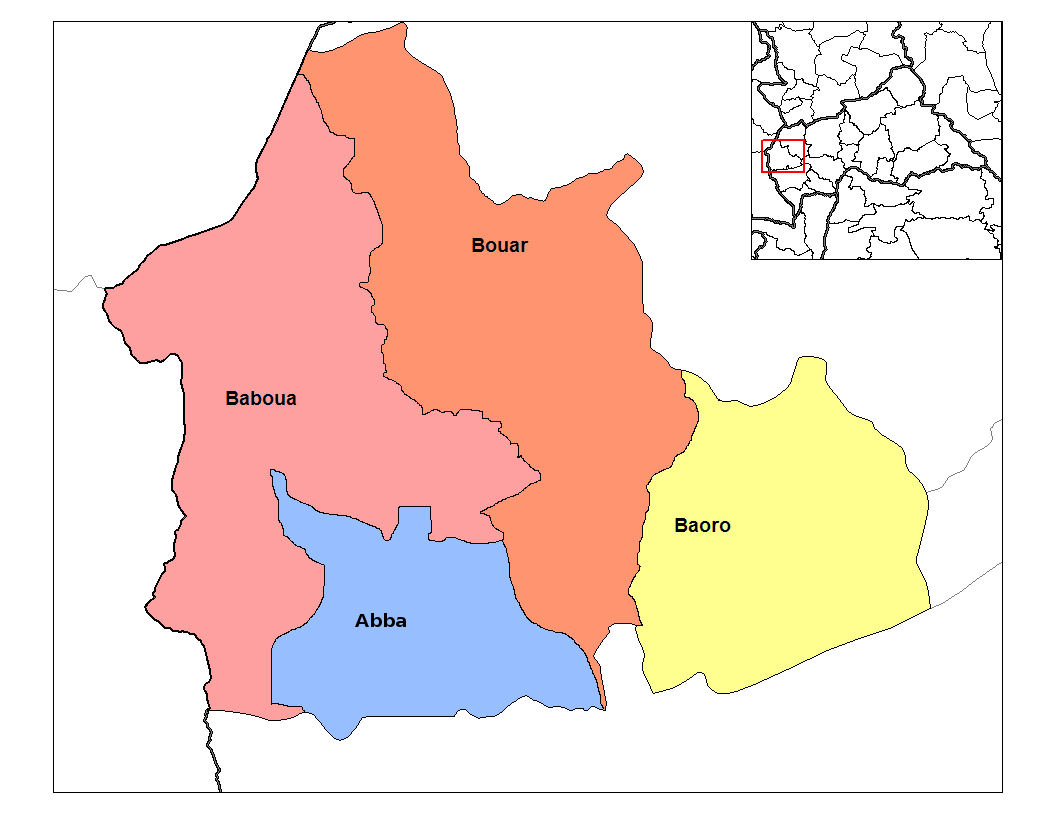
Sub-prefectures of Nana-Mambere

- Baboua
- Baoro
- Bouar
- Abba
