= Border town =

Settlement near a boundary between two regions

A border town is a town or city close to the boundary between two countries, states, or regions. Usually the term implies that the nearness to the border is one of the things the place is most famous for. With close proximities to a different country, diverse cultural traditions can have certain influence to the place. Border towns can have highly cosmopolitan communities, a feature they share with port cities, as traveling and trading often go through the town. They can also be flashpoints for international conflicts, especially when the two countries have territorial disputes.

== Transcontinental ==
Border towns	Country	Bordering continents
El-Qantarah el-Sharqiyya	Egypt	Africa/Asia
Istanbul	Turkey	Europe/Asia
Atyrau	Kazakhstan	Europe/Asia
Oral	Kazakhstan	Europe/Asia
Magnitogorsk	Russia	Europe/Asia

== List of international border towns and cities ==
=== Africa ===
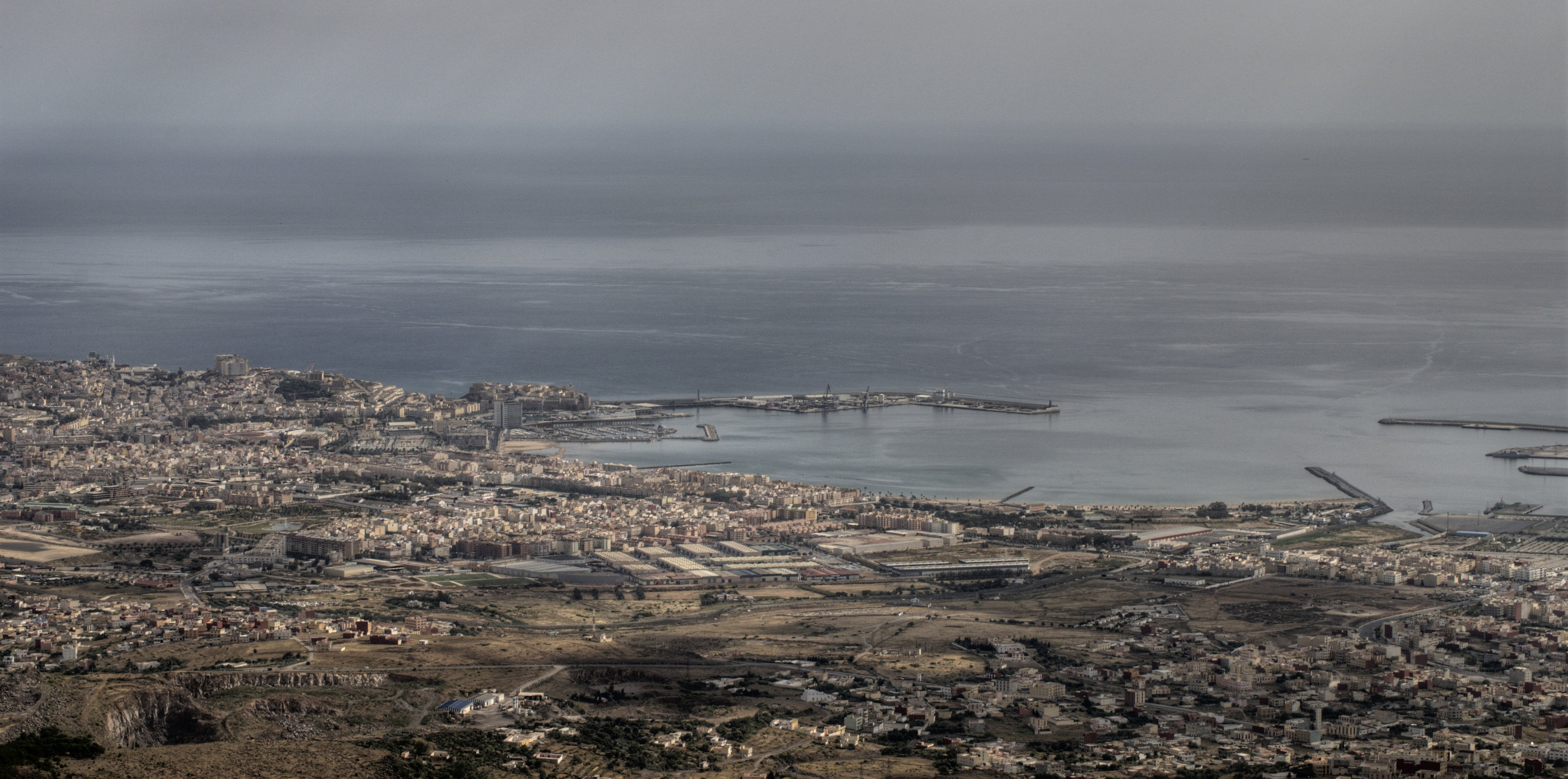
Melilla, Spain (left) and Beni Ansar, Morocco (right)

Border towns	Bordering countries
Abu Jaradil	Sudan / Central African Republic
Acoacán	Equatorial Guinea / Gabon
Adré	Chad / Sudan
Aflao	Ghana / Togo
Afoji	Uganda / South Sudan
Ahfir	Morocco / Algeria
Alexander Bay	South Africa / Namibia
Andéramboukane	Mali / Niger
Ariamsvlei	Namibia / South Africa
Assamakka	Niger / Algeria
Assamo	Djibouti / Ethiopia
Badme	Eritrea / Ethiopia
Bahaï	Chad / Sudan
Bakel	Senegal / Mauritania
Bambouti/Source Yubu	Central African Republic / South Sudan
Bang	Central African Republic / Cameroon
Bangassou	Central African Republic / Democratic Republic of the Congo
Bangui/Zongo	Central African Republic / Democratic Republic of the Congo
Bariguna	South Sudan / Central African Republic
Beitbridge	Zimbabwe / South Africa
Bémbéré	Central African Republic / Chad
Benena	Mali / Burkina Faso
Beni Ensar	Morocco / Spain
Béni Ounif/Figuig	Algeria / Morocco
Bétou	Republic of the Congo / Central African Republic
Blangoua	Cameroon / Chad
Bokspits	Botswana / South Africa
Bolobo	Democratic Republic of the Congo / Republic of the Congo
Boma	Democratic Republic of the Congo / Angola
Bomandjokou	Central African Republic / Cameroon
Bomassa	Republic of the Congo / Cameroon
Bongor	Chad / Cameroon
Bosso	Niger / Nigeria
Bray/Bray	South Africa / Botswana
Bugarama	Rwanda / Democratic Republic of the Congo
Bukavu/Cyangugu	Democratic Republic of the Congo / Rwanda
Bulembu	Eswatini / South Africa
Bulok	Gambia / Senegal
Bunangana/Bunagana	Democratic Republic of the Congo / Uganda
Buruntuma	Guinea Bissau / Guinea Bissau
Busia /Busia	Kenya / Uganda
Ceuta/ Belyounech	Spain / Morocco
Chembe	Zambia / Democratic Republic of the Congo
Chicualacuala	Mozambique / Zimbabwe
Cinkassé	Togo / Burkina Faso
Cocobeach	Gabon / Equatorial Guinea
Dadda'to	Djibouti / Eritrea
Damasak	Nigeria / Niger
Débété	Ivory Coast / Mali
Dedza	Malawi / Mozambique
Dehiba/Wazzin	Libya / Tunisia
Dhobley	Kenya / Somalia
Diboli/ Kidira	Mali / Senegal
Dilolo/ Luau	Angola / Democratic Republic of the Congo
Dolo and Dolow	Ethiopia / Somalia
Dongo	Democratic Republic of the Congo / Republic of the Congo
Dongou	Republic of the Congo / Democratic Republic of the Congo
Douar El Ma	Algeria / Tunisia
Ebibeyin	Equatorial Guinea / Gabon / Cameroon
El Wak	Kenya / Somalia
Espungabera	Mozambique / Zimbabwe
Ezo	South Sudan / Democratic Republic of Congo / Central African Republic
Farafenni	Gambia / Senegal
Faramana	Burkina Faso / Mali
Ferfer	Ethiopia / Somalia
Ficksburg/ Maputsoe	South Africa / Lesotho
Fnideq	Morocco / Spain
Gakhibane	Botswana / South Africa
Galafi	Djibouti / Ethiopia
Galdogob	Somalia / Ethiopia
Gallabat/Metemma	Sudan / Ethiopia
Gamboru / Fotokol	Nigeria / Cameroon
Gbéléban	Ivory Coast / Guinea
Ganta	Liberia / Guinea
Garoua-Boulaï/ Cantonnier	Cameroon / Central African Republic
Gaya/Malanville	Niger / Benin
Gbiti/Banga-Boumbé	Cameroon / Central African Republic
Geriley	Somalia / Kenya
Ghat	Libya / Algeria
Ghadames/ Debdeb	Libya / Algeria
Gnato	Ivory Coast / Liberia
Gogui	Mali / Mauritania
Goli	Uganda / Democratic Republic of the Congo
Goma/Gisenyi	Democratic Republic of the Congo / Rwanda
Hamile	Ghana / Burkina Faso
Heddada/Sakiet Sidi Youssef	Algeria / Tunisia
Helao Nafidi	Namibia / Angola
Holili/ Taveta	Tanzania / Kenya
Humera	Ethiopia / Eritrea / Sudan
Idiroko	Nigeria / Benin
Ilara-Ogudo Yewa	Nigeria / Benin
Impfondo	Republic of the Congo / Democratic Republic of the Congo
In Amenas	Algeria / Libya
In Guezzam	Algeria / Niger
In Khalil	Mali / Algeria
Isebania / Isebania	Tanzania / Kenya
Kaya	South Sudan / Uganda
Kaédi	Mauritania / Senegal
Kasane	Botswana / Uganda / Namibia
Kasindi/ Mpondwe	Democratic Republic of the Congo / Uganda
Kasumbalesa/Kasumbalesa	Democratic Republic of the Congo / Zambia
Katima Mulilo/ Sesheke	Namibia / Zambia
Katwitwi	Namibia / Angola
Katuna/Gatuna	Uganda / Rwanda
Kazungula	Zambia / Botswana / Zimbabwe / Namibia
Kemerida/ Ouaké	Togo / Benin
Kinshasa/Brazzaville	Democratic Republic of the Congo / Republic of the Congo
Kipushi	Democratic Republic of the Congo / Zambia
Koboko	Uganda / Democratic Republic of the Congo
Kolonkwane	Botswana / South Africa
Kontcha	Cameroon / Nigeria
Kouango	Central African Republic / Democratic Republic of the Congo
Kulungugu	Ghana / Burkina Faso
Kurmuk	Sudan / Ethiopia
Kwamouth	Democratic Republic of the Congo / Republic of the Congo
Labbézanga	Mali / Niger
Lavumisa	Eswatini / South Africa
Libenge	Democratic Republic of the Congo / Central African Republic
Lobatse	Botswana / South Africa
Lomé	Togo / Ghana
Loyada/ Lawyacado	Djibouti /Somalia
Luangwa	Zambia / Zimbabwe / Mozambique
Lukolela	Democratic Republic of the Congo / Republic of the Congo
Lwakhakha and Lwakhakha	Uganda / Kenya
Machipanda/Mutare	Mozambique / Zimbabwe
Madina Woula	Guinea / Sierra Leone
Mahamba	Eswatini / South Africa
Mahou	Mali / Burkina Faso
Maigatari	Nigeria / Niger
Makopong	Botswana / South Africa
Malaba/Malaba	Kenya / Uganda
Manankoro	Mali / Ivory Coast
Mandera/Beled Hawo	Kenya / Somalia
Mani	Chad / Cameroon
Marka	Malawi / Mozambique
Markounda	Central African Republic / Chad
Maseru	Lesotho / South Africa
Matadi	Democratic Republic of the Congo / Angola
Matam	Senegal / Mauritania
Mbinda	Republic of Congo / Gabon
Melilla/Beni Ansar	Spain / Morocco
Middlepits	Botswana / South Africa
Mobaye/Mobayi-Mbongo	Central African Republic / Democratic Republic of the Congo
Mokambo	Democratic Republic of the Congo / Zambia
Moloundou	Cameroon / Republic of the Congo
Mongomo	Equatorial Guinea / Gabon
Mongoumba	Central African Republic / Democratic Republic of the Congo
Mossaka	Republic of the Congo / Democratic Republic of the Congo
Moyale	Ethiopia / Kenya
Moyenne-Sido	Central African Republic / Democratic Republic of the Congo
Mukumbura	Mozambique / Zimbabwe
Mwandi	Zambia / Namibia
Namaacha	Eswatini / Mozambique
Nabiapai	Democratic Republic of the Congo / South Sudan
Namanga	Tanzania / Kenya
Nayé	Senegal / Mali
Nayuchi	Malawi / Mozambique
N'Djamena/ Kousseri	Chad / Cameroon
Ngaoui	Cameroon / Central African Republic
Nimule /Elegu	South Sudan / Uganda
Nongoa	Guinea / Sierra Leone
Nouadhibou	Mauritania / Morocco
Nsanje	Malawi / Mozambique
Nyamapanda	Zimbabwe / Mozambique
Onseepkans	South Africa / Namibia
Oraba	Uganda / South Sudan
Ouango	Central African Republic / Namibia
Ouésso	Republic of the Congo / Democratic Republic of the Congo
Oujda	Morocco / Algeria
Qacha's Nek	Lesotho / South Africa
Paga	Ghana / Burkina Faso
Phepheng	Botswana / South Africa
Ponta do Ouro	Mozambique / South Africa
Pweto	Democratic Republic of the Congo / Zambia
Ras Ajdir	Libya / Tunisia
Rietfontein	South Africa / Namibia
Río Campo	Equatorial Guinea / Cameroon
Rosso	Mauritania / Senegal
Rundu	Namibia / Angola
Rusumo	Rwanda / Tanzania
Saïdia/ Marsa Ben M'Hidi	Morocco / Algeria
Sallum	Egypt / Libya
São Domingos	Guinea Bissau / Senegal
Shangombo	Zambia / Angola
Sokoro	Ivory Coast / Mali
Struizendam	Botswana / South Africa
Suam	Uganda / Kenya
Taleb Larbi	Algeria / Tunisia
Tansila/Boura	Burkina Faso / Mali
Tin Zaouatine	Algeria / Tanzania
Tina	Chad / Sudan
Tissi	Central African Republic / Chad
Togo Wuchale	Ethiopia / Somalia
Tunduma/Nakonde	Tanzania / Zambia
Um Dafuq/ Am Dafok	Sudan / Central African Republic
Um Dukhun	Chad / Sudan
Victoria Falls/ Livingstone	Zimbabwe and Zambia
Vioolsdrif/ Noordoewer	South Africa / Namibia
Werda	Botswana / South Africa
Yakoma	Democratic Republic of the Congo / Central African Republic
Yekepa	Liberia / Guinea
Yumbi	Democratic Republic of the Congo / Republic of the Congo
Zégoua	Mali / Ivory Coast
Zemio	Central African Republic / Democratic Republic of the Congo

=== Asia ===
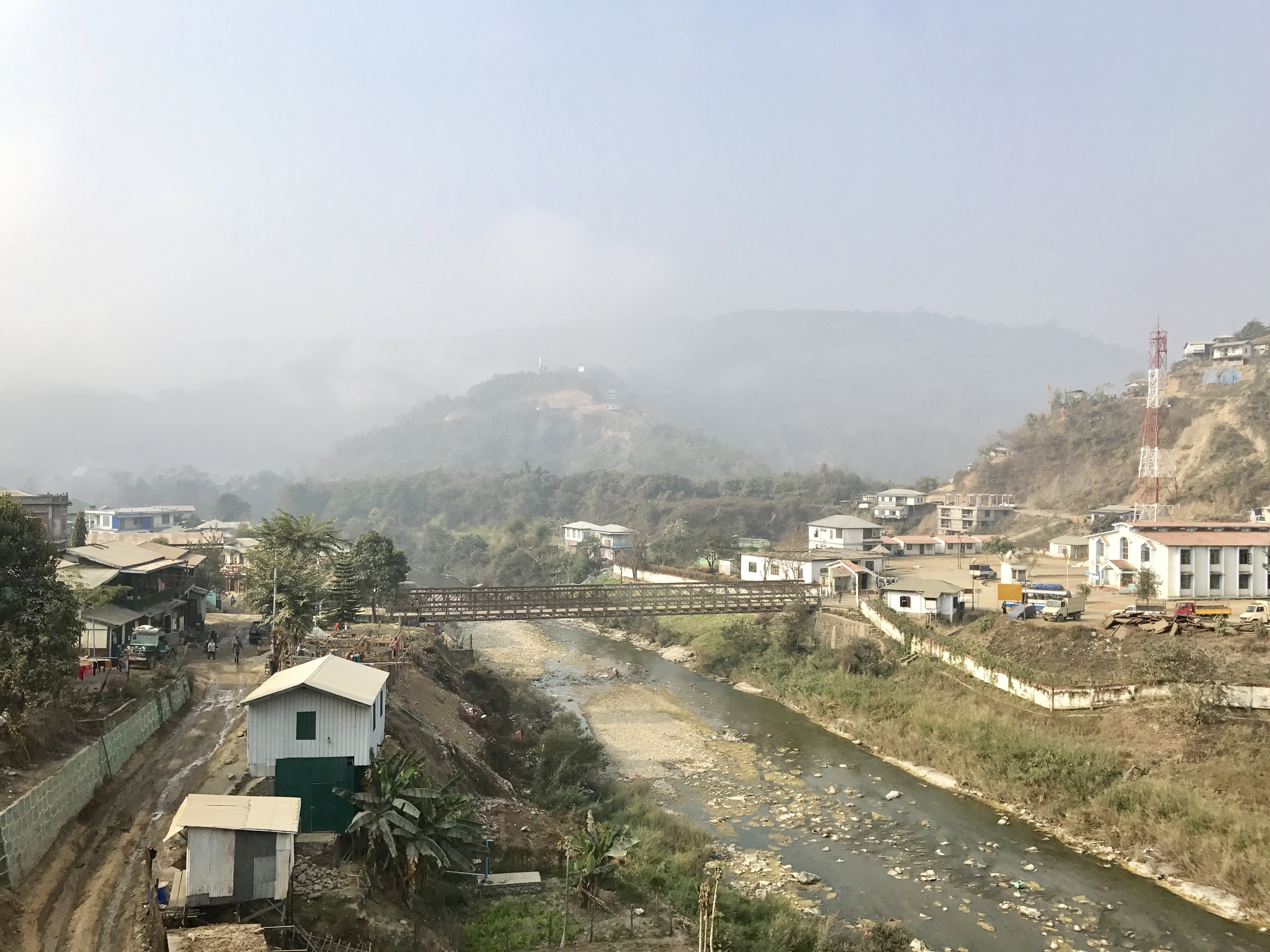
Rikhawdar, Myanmar (left) and Zokhawthar, India (right)

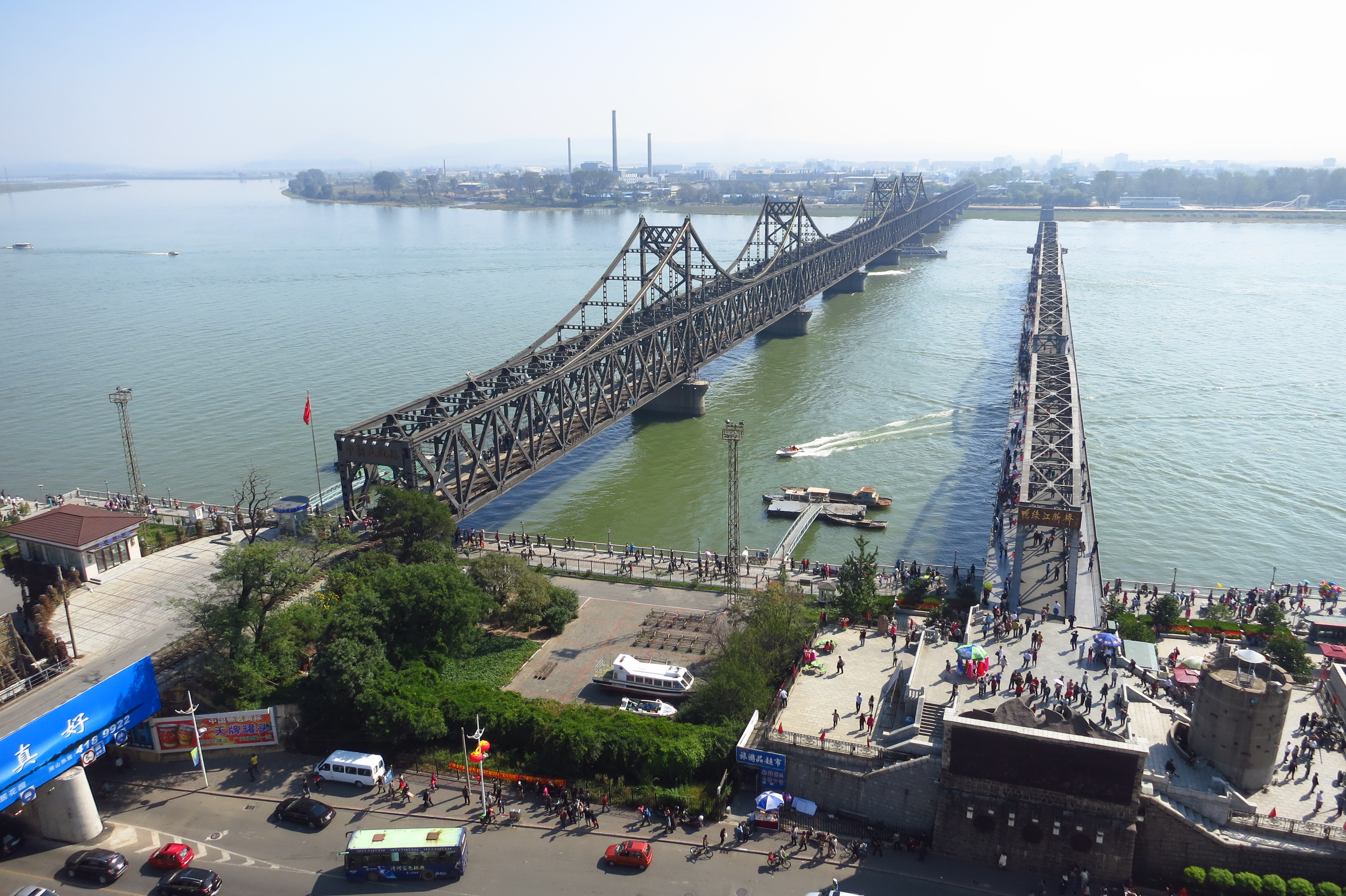
Sinuiju, North Korea (top) and Dandong, China (bottom)

Border towns	Bordering countries
Islam Qala/Taybad	Afghanistan / Iran
Zaranj/Zehak	Afghanistan / Iran
Spin Boldak/Chaman	Afghanistan / Pakistan
Torkham/Torkham	Afghanistan / Pakistan
Torghundi/Serhetabat	Afghanistan / Turkmenistan
Hairatan/Termez	Afghanistan / Uzbekistan
Astara/Astara	Azerbaijan / Iran
Julfa/Jolfa	Azerbaijan / Iran
Teknaf/Maungdaw	Bangladesh / Myanmar
Phuntsholing/Jaigaon	Bhutan / India
Tutong/Limbang	Brunei / Malaysia
Temburong District/Lawas	Brunei / Malaysia
Temburong District/Limbang	Brunei / Malaysia
Kuala Belait/Miri	Brunei / Malaysia
Shenzhen/Lo Wu/Heung Yuen Wai	China / Hong Kong
Alashankou/Dostyk	China / Kazakhstan
Khorgas/Korgas	China / Kazakhstan
Mohan/Muang Namo	China / Laos
Gongbei/Portas do Cerco	China / Macau
Hengqin/Cotai	China / Macau
Erenhot/Zamyn-Üüd	China / Mongolia
Ruili/Muse	China / Myanmar
Zhangmu/Tatopani, Sindhupalchok	China / Nepal
Gyirong Town/Timure	China / Nepal
Changbai/Hyesan	China / North Korea
Dandong/Sinuiju	China / North Korea
Ji'an, Jilin/Manpo	China / North Korea
Heihe/Blagoveshchensk	China / Russia
Manzhouli/Zabaykalsk	China / Russia
Suifenhe/Pogranichny	China / Russia
Yanji/Khasan	China / Russia
Raohe/Bikin	China / Russia
Xiamen/Kinmen	China / Taiwan
Lianjiang/Lienchiang	China / Taiwan
Dongxing/Mong Cai	China / Vietnam
Hekou/Lao Cai	China / Vietnam
Youyiguan/Lang Son	China / Vietnam
Rafah /Rafah	Egypt / Gaza Strip
Basirhat/Satkhira	India / Bangladesh
Petrapole/Benapole	India / Bangladesh
Agartala/Akhaura	India / Bangladesh
Karimganj/Beanibazar Upazila	India / Bangladesh
Malda/Rajshahi	India / Bangladesh
West Garo Hills/Bakshiganj	India / Bangladesh
Tura/Nalitabari Upazila	India / Bangladesh
Santirbazar/Feni	India / Bangladesh
Moreh /Tamu	India / Myanmar
Zorinpui/Paletwa	India / Myanmar
Panitanki/Kakarbhitta	India / Nepal
Jogbani/Biratnagar	India / Nepal
Raxaul/Birgunj	India / Nepal
Nautanwa/Siddharthanagar	India / Nepal
Rupaidiha/Nepalgunj	India / Nepal
Banbasa/Bhimdatta	India / Nepal
Fazilka/Lahore	India / Pakistan
Sajingan Besar/Lundu	Indonesia / Malaysia
Entikong/Tebedu	Indonesia / Malaysia
Badau/Lubok Antu	Indonesia / Malaysia
Putussibau/Kapit	Indonesia / Malaysia
Long Apari/Bukit Mabong	Indonesia / Malaysia
Kayan Hulu/Belaga	Indonesia / Malaysia
Sebatik	Indonesia / Malaysia
Mota'ain/Batugade	Indonesia / East Timor
Altanbulag/Kyakhta	Mongolia / Russia
Eilat/Aqaba	Israel / Jordan
Eilat/Taba	Israel / Egypt
Sarakhs/Serakhs	Iran / Turkmenistan
Zakho /Dohuk	Iraq / Turkey
Mandali	Iraq / Iran
Halabja	Iraq / Iran
Al-Faw	Iraq / Iran
Abu Al-Khaseeb	Iraq / Iran
Abadan	Iraq / Iran
Penjwin	Iraq / Iran
Khanaqin	Iraq / Iran
Rabia/Al-Yaarubiyah	Iraq / Syria
Al-Khalidiyah/Faysh Khabur	Iraq / Syria
Ban Dongphosy/Nong Khai	Laos / Thailand
Vientiane/Udon Thani	Laos / Thailand
Arida	Lebanon / Syria
Tanjung Kupang/Tuas	Malaysia / Singapore
Johor Bahru/Woodlands	Malaysia / Singapore
Bukit Kayu Hitam/Sadao	Malaysia / Thailand
Pengkalan Hulu/Songkhla	Malaysia / Thailand
Pengkalan Kubur/Betong	Malaysia / Thailand
Wang Kelian/Sungai Golok	Malaysia / Thailand
Rantau Panjang/Tak Bai	Malaysia / Thailand
Kangar/Satun	Malaysia / Thailand
Padang Besar/Padang Besar	Malaysia / Thailand
Rikhawdar/Zokhawthar	Myanmar / India
Tachilek/Mae Sai	Myanmar / Thailand
Myawaddy/Mae Sot	Myanmar / Thailand
Troitsk	Russia / Kazakhstan
Nusaybin/Qamishli	Turkey / Syria
Şenyurt/Al-Darbasiyah	Turkey / Syria
Ceylanpınar/Ras al-Ayn	Turkey / Syria
Akçakale/Tell Abyad	Turkey / Syria
Mürşitpınar/Kobani	Turkey / Syria
Karkamış/Jarabulus	Turkey / Syria

=== Europe ===
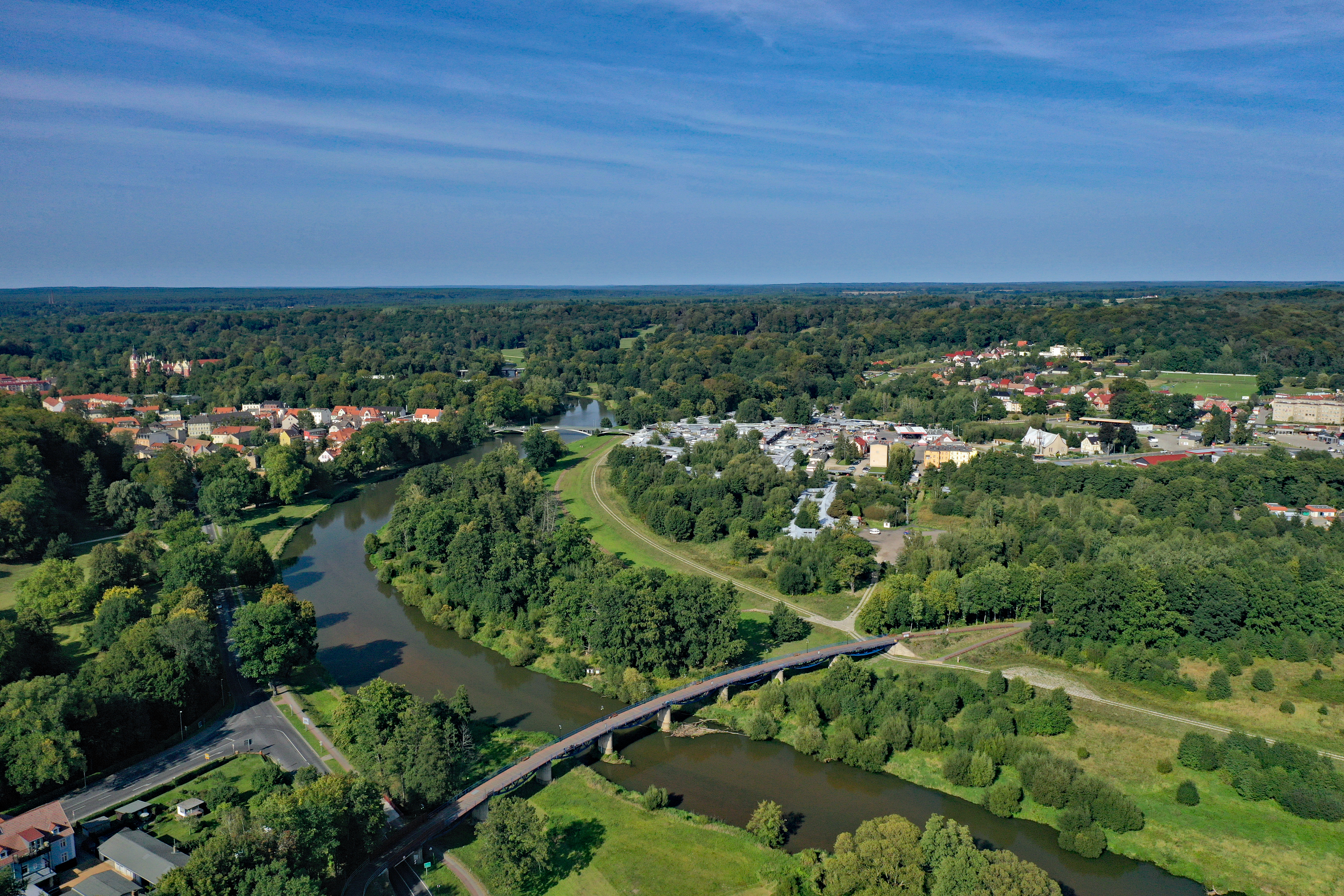
Bad Muskau, Germany (left) and Łęknica, Poland (right)

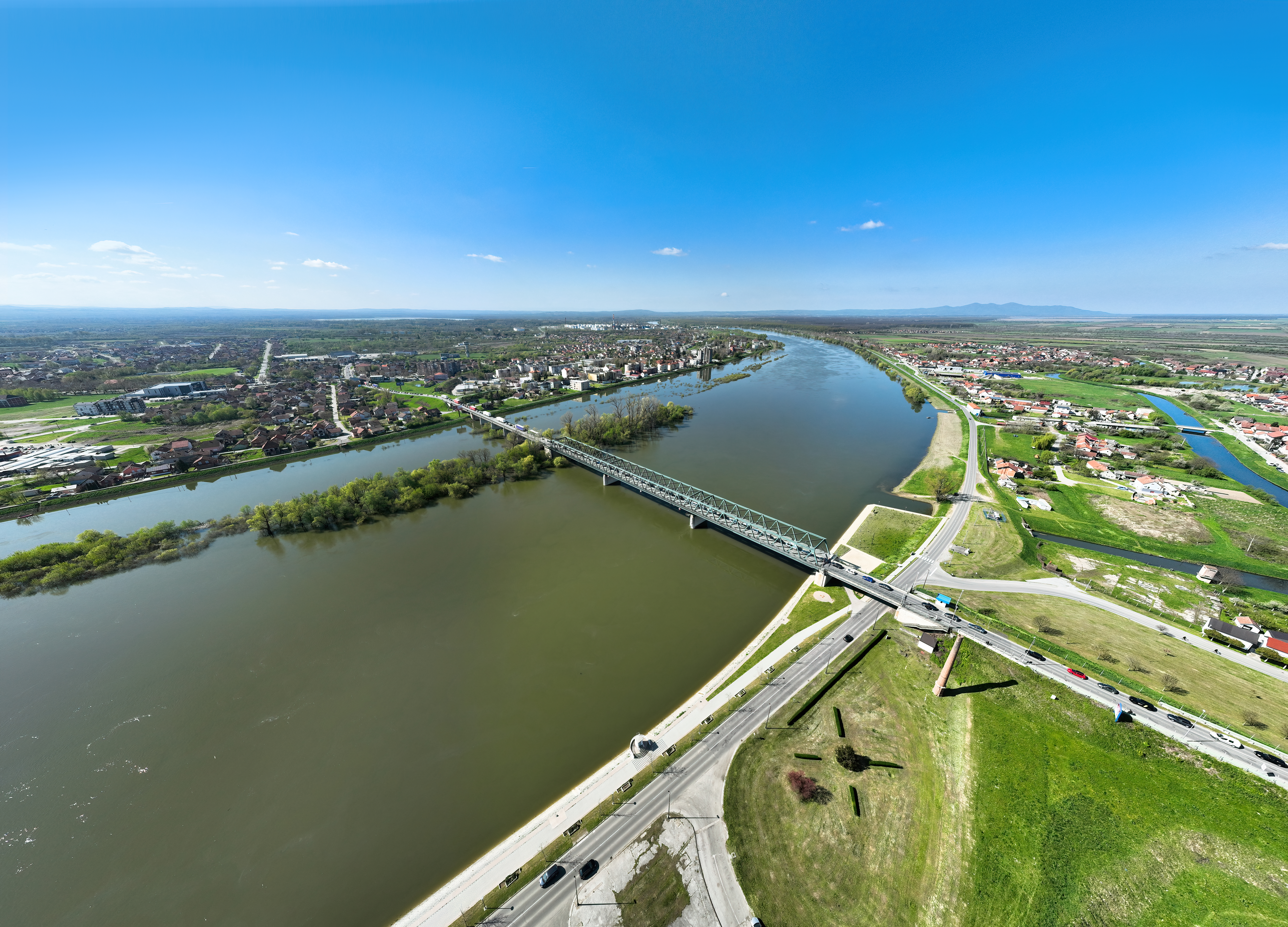
Brod, Bosnia and Herzegovina (left) and Slavonski Brod, Croatia (right)

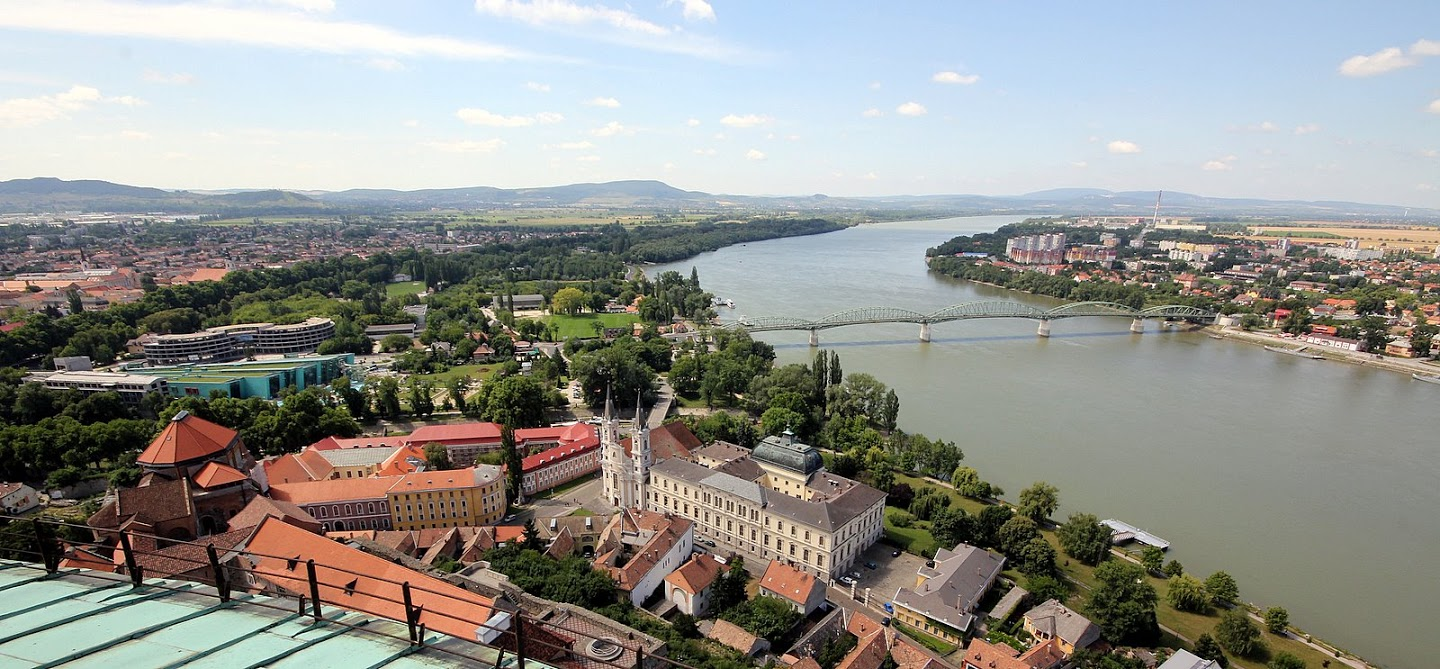
Esztergom, Hungary (left) and Štúrovo, Slovakia (right)

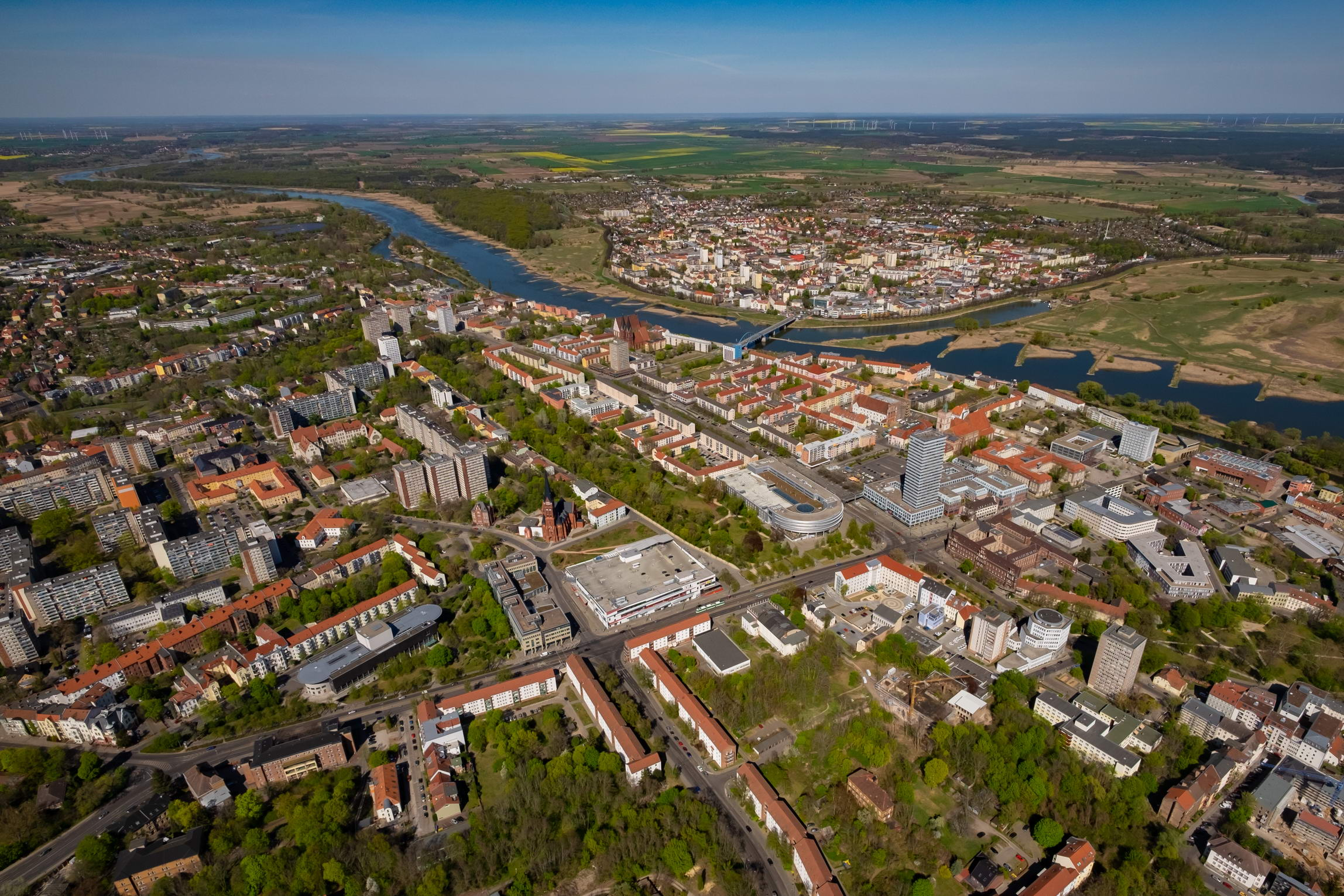
Frankfurt (Oder), Germany (bottom) and Słubice, Poland (top)

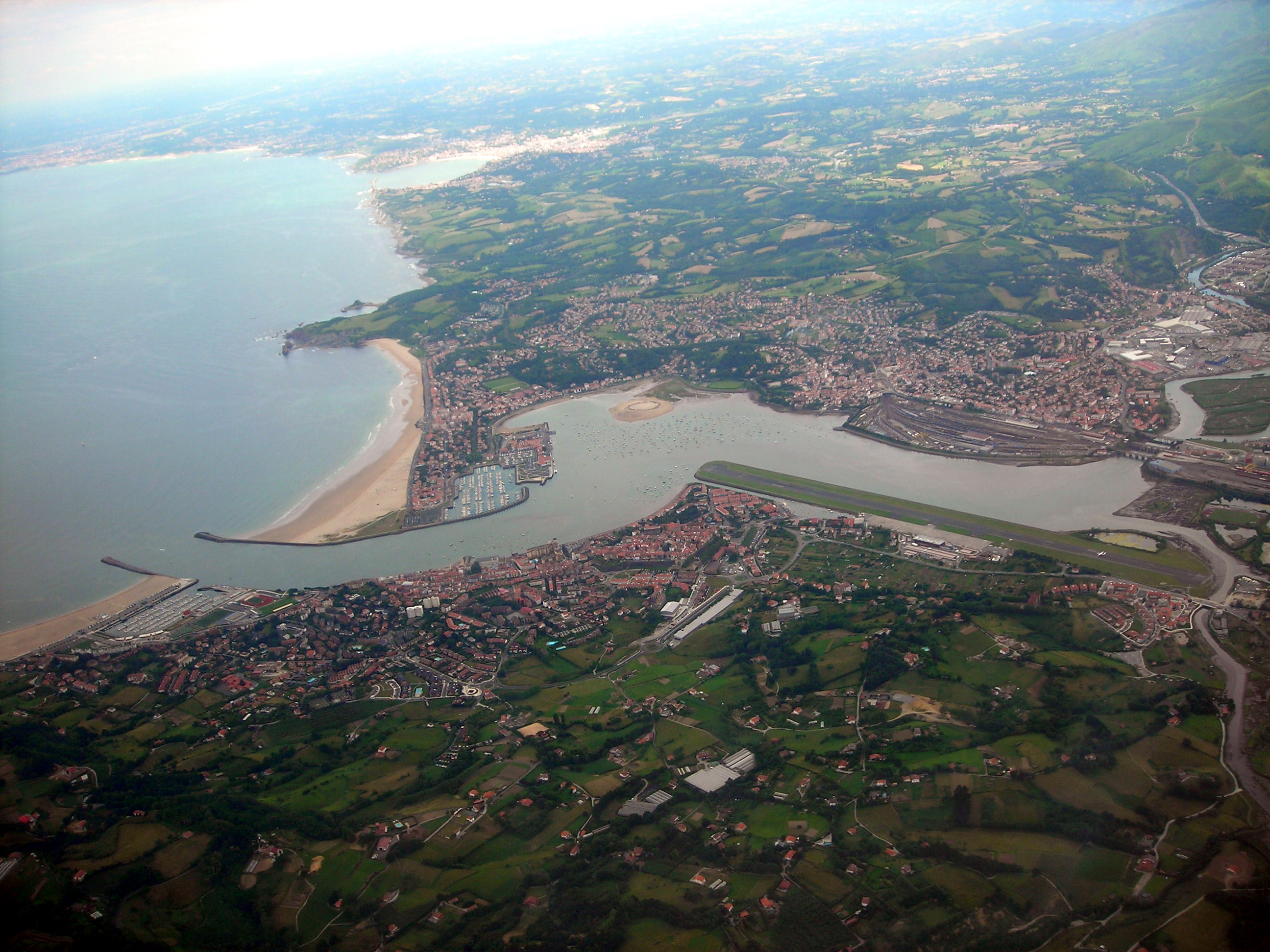
Hendaye, France (top) and Hondarribia, Spain (bottom)

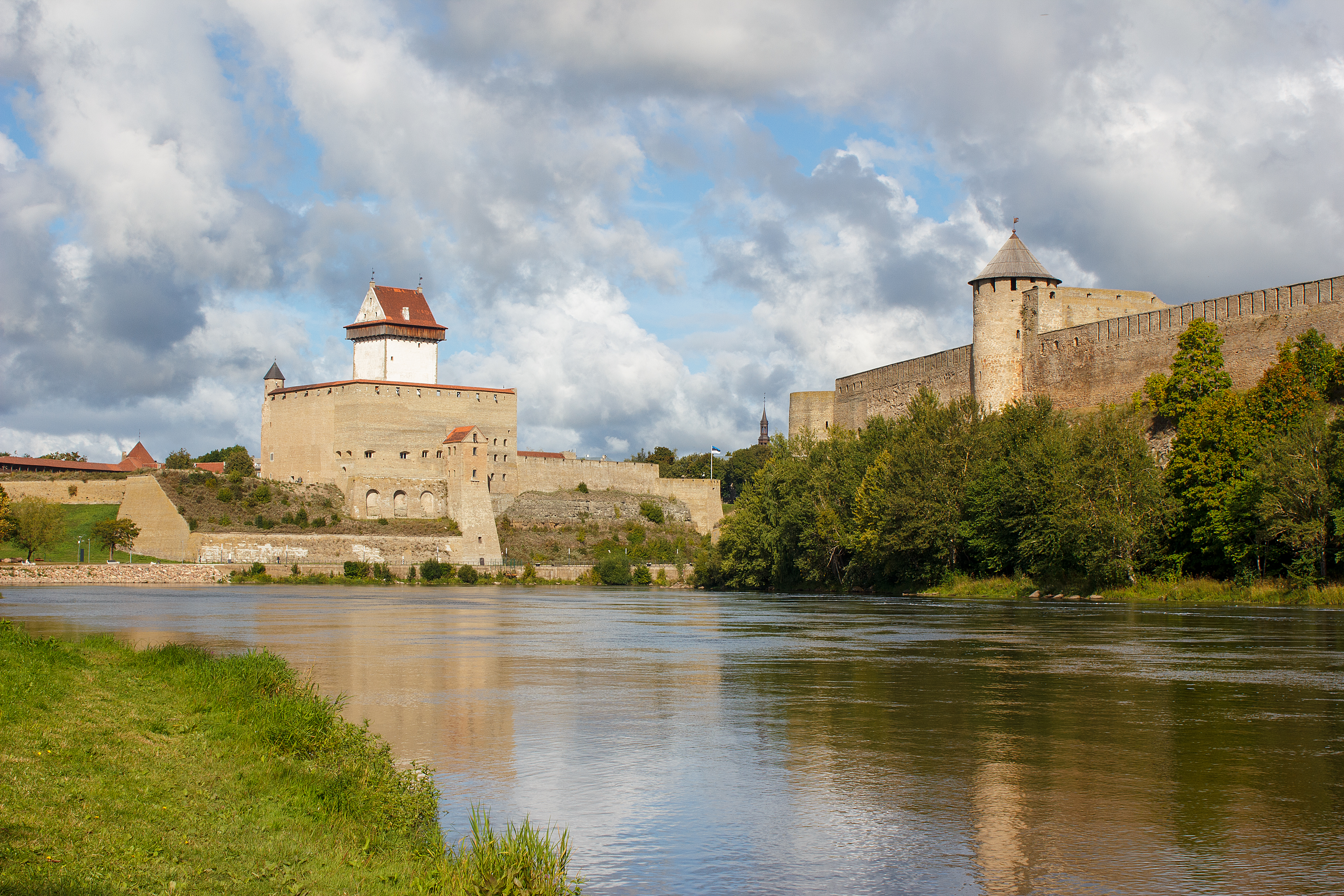
Narva, Estonia (left) and Ivangorod, Russia (right)

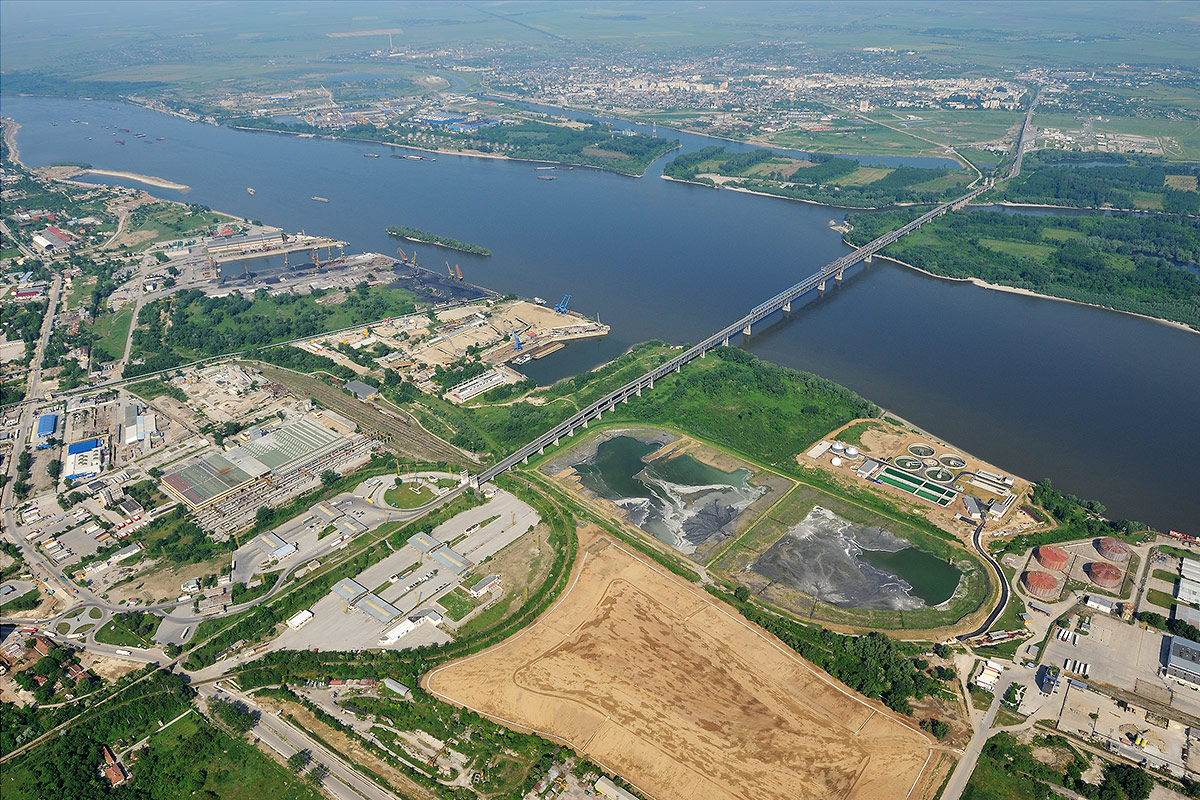
Ruse, Bulgaria (bottom) and Giurgiu, Romania (top)

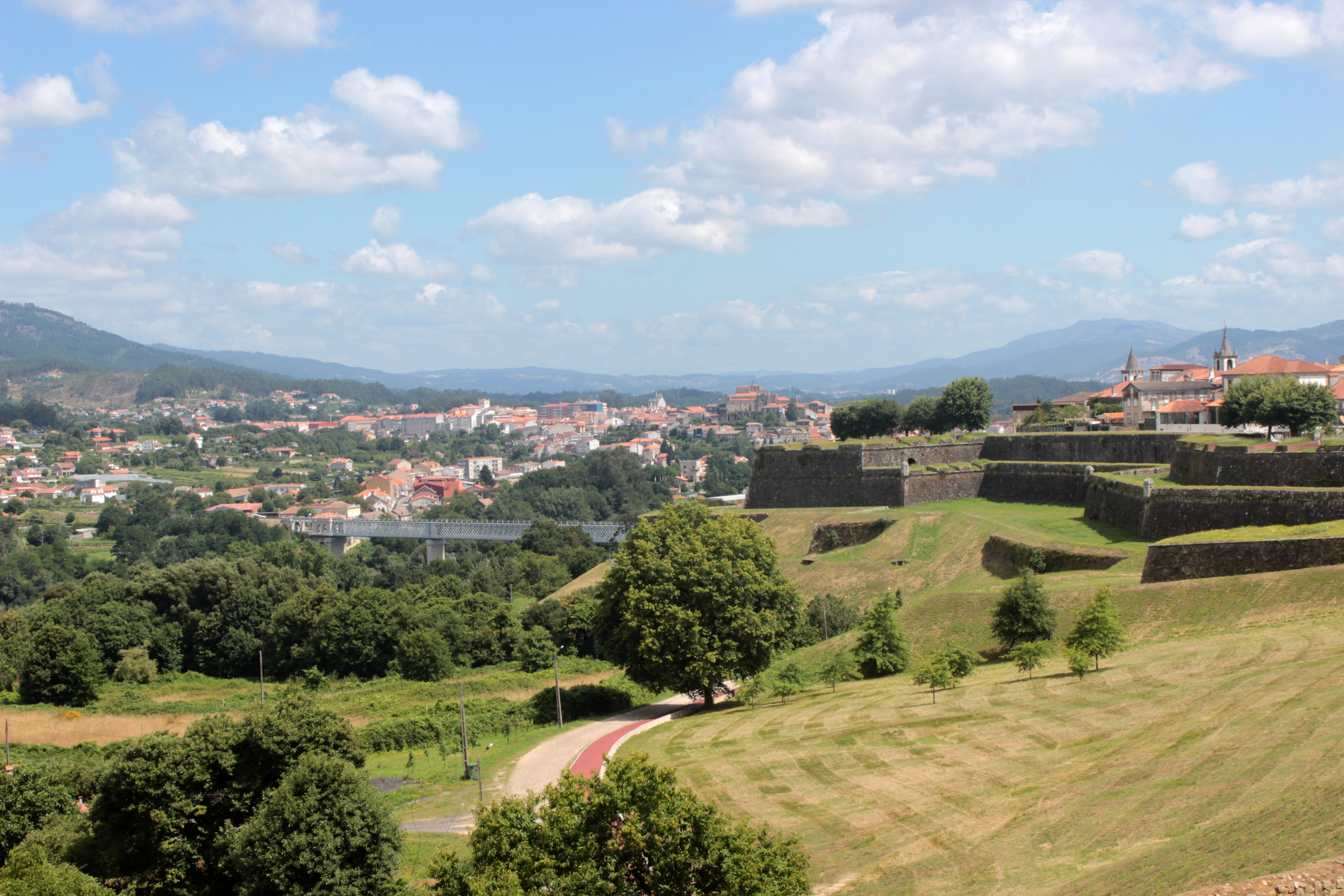
Tui, Spain (left) and Valença do Minho, Portugal (right)

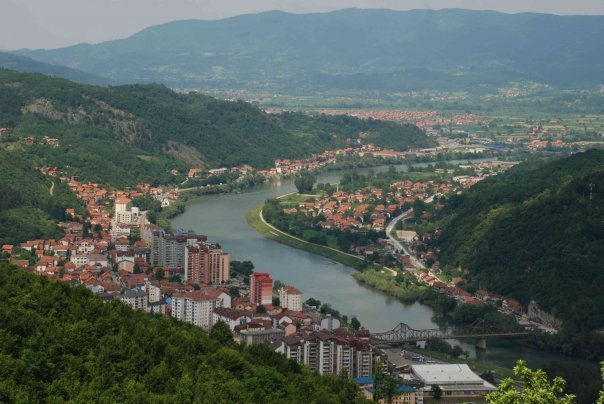
Zvornik, Bosnia and Herzegovina (left) and Mali Zvornik, Serbia (right)

Border towns	Bordering countries
Geneva	Switzerland / France
Mulhouse	France / Germany
Strasbourg/Kehl	France / Germany
Saarbrücken	Germany / France
Saint Louis/Weil am Rhein/Basel	France / Germany / Switzerland
Como/Chiasso	Italy / Switzerland
Gorizia/Nova Gorica	Italy / Slovenia
Konstanz/Kreuzlingen	Germany / Switzerland
Ainaži	Latvia / Estonia
Narva/Ivangorod	Estonia / Russia
Valga/Valka	Estonia / Latvia
Kybartai/Chernyshevskoye	Lithuania / Russia
Panemunė/Sovetsk	Lithuania / Russia
Gantiadi/Vesyoloye	Georgia / Russia
Sarpi/Sarp	Georgia / Turkey
Gibraltar / La Línea de la Concepción	United Kingdom / Spain
Bourg-Madame / Puigcerdà	France / Spain
Hendaye / Irún / Hondarribia	France / Spain
Le Perthus / Els Límits	France / Spain
Arnéguy / Pekotxeta	France / Spain
Elvas / Badajoz	Portugal / Spain
Valença do Minho / Tui	Portugal / Spain
Rio de Onor / Rihonor de Castilla	Portugal / Spain
Derry	United Kingdom / Republic of Ireland
Dundalk	United Kingdom / Republic of Ireland
Newry	United Kingdom / Republic of Ireland
Strabane	United Kingdom / Republic of Ireland
Bratislava	Slovakia / Austria /Hungary
Braunau am Inn/Simbach am Inn	Austria / Germany
Oberndorf bei Salzburg/Laufen	Austria / Germany
Schärding	Austria / Germany
Brest/Terespol	Belarus / Poland
Burghausen	Germany / Austria
Passau	Germany / Austria
Branice	Poland / Czech Republic
Cieszyn/Český Těšín	Poland / Czech Republic
Głuchołazy	Poland / Czech Republic
Kietrz	Poland / Czech Republic
Lubawka	Poland / Czech Republic
Prudnik	Poland / Czech Republic
Świeradów-Zdrój/Nové Město pod Smrkem	Poland / Czech Republic
Szklarska Poręba/Harrachov	Poland / Czech Republic
Zawidów	Poland / Czech Republic
Złoty Stok	Poland / Czech Republic
Chop/Záhony/Čierna nad Tisou	Ukraine / Hungary / Slovakia
Esztergom/Štúrovo	Hungary / Slovakia
Bad Muskau/Łęknica	Germany / Poland
Forst	Germany / Poland
Frankfurt (Oder)/Słubice	Germany / Poland
Görlitz/Zgorzelec	Germany / Poland
Guben/Gubin	Germany / Poland
Ostritz	Germany / Poland
Schwedt/Oder	Germany / Poland
Cheb/Waldsassen	Czech Republic / Germany
Jiříkov/Ebersbach-Neugersdorf	Czech Republic / Germany
Rumburk/Varnsdorf/Seifhennersdorf	Czech Republic / Germany
Donetsk	Russia / Ukraine
Gukovo	Russia / Ukraine
Gmünd/České Velenice	Austria / Czech Republic
Hardegg	Austria / Czech Republic
Laa an der Thaya	Austria / Czech Republic
Hodonín/Holíč	Czech Republic / Slovakia
Lanžhot	Czech Republic / Slovakia
Hrádek nad Nisou/Zittau/Bogatynia	Czech Republic / Germany / Poland
Komárom/Komárno	Hungary / Slovakia
Gryfino	Poland / Germany
Kostrzyn nad Odrą	Poland / Germany
Świnoujście	Poland / Germany
Krnov	Czech Republic / Poland
Náchod/Kudowa-Zdrój	Czech Republic / Poland
Vidnava	Czech Republic / Poland
Zlaté Hory	Czech Republic / Poland
Marchegg	Austria / Slovakia
Mikulov	Czech Republic / Austria
Slavonice	Czech Republic / Austria
Mohyliv-Podilskyi/Otaci	Ukraine / Moldova
Piwniczna-Zdrój	Poland / Slovakia
Sátoraljaújhely/Slovenské Nové Mesto	Hungary / Slovakia
Giurgiu/Ruse	Romania / Bulgaria
Călărași/Silistra	Romania / Bulgaria
Calafat/Vidin	Romania / Bulgaria
Halden/ Strömstad	Norway / Sweden
Copenhagen/Malmö	Denmark / Sweden
Padborg/ Flensburg	Denmark / Germany
Tornio/Haparanda	Finland / Sweden
Imatra / Svetogorsk	Finland / Russia
Karesuando/Karesuvanto	Finland / Sweden
Beausoleil	France / Monaco
Lavena Ponte Tresa/Ponte Tresa	Italy / Switzerland
Menton/Ventimiglia	France / Italy
Rimini /Serravalle	San Marino / Italy
Rome/Vatican City	Italy / Vatican City
Trieste	Italy / Slovenia
Koper	Italy / Slovenia
Slavonski Brod/Brod	Croatia / Bosnia and Herzegovina
Županja/Orašje	Croatia / Bosnia and Herzegovina
Mali Zvornik/Zvornik	Serbia / Bosnia and Herzegovina
Ustyluh	Ukraine / Poland
Uzhhorod	Ukraine / Slovakia
Žagarė	Lithuania / Latvia
Aachen	Belgium / Netherlands / Germany
Aalten	Netherlands / Germany
Antwerp	Belgium / Netherlands
Baarle-Hertog/ Baarle-Nassau	Belgium / Netherlands
Damme	Belgium / Netherlands
Essen	Belgium / Netherlands
Genk	Belgium / Netherlands
Hoogstraten	Belgium / Netherlands
Kalmthout	Belgium / Netherlands
Knokke	Belgium / Netherlands
Lommel	Belgium / Netherlands
Maaseik	Belgium / Netherlands
Maastricht	Belgium / Netherlands
Putte / Putte	Belgium / Netherlands
Sas van Gent / Zelzate	Belgium / Netherlands
Turnhout	Belgium / Netherlands
Arlon	Belgium / Luxembourg
Bad Bentheim	Germany / Netherlands
Bad Nieuweschans	Netherlands / Germany
Bastogne	Belgium / Luxembourg
Bergen op Zoom	Belgium / Luxembourg
Bocholt	Germany / Netherlands
Borken	Germany / Netherlands
Bredevoort	Netherlands / Germany
Coevorden	Netherlands / Germany
Dinxperlo/Suderwick	Netherlands / Germany
Emmen	Netherlands / Germany
Emmerich	Germany / Netherlands
Enschede	Netherlands / Germany
Erkelenz	Germany / Netherlands
Eupen	Belgium / Germany
Gennep	Netherlands / Germany
Goch	Germany / Netherlands
Gronau	Germany / Netherlands
Heinsberg	Germany / Netherlands
Herzogenrath/ Kerkrade	Germany / Netherlands
Houffalize	Belgium / Luxembourg
Hulst	Belgium / Luxembourg
Kalmthout	Belgium / Netherlands
Kevelaer	Germany / Netherlands
Kleve	Germany / Netherlands
Malmedy	Belgium / Germany
Martelange	Belgium / Luxembourg
Mol	Belgium / Netherlands
Mönchengladbach	Germany / Netherlands
Monschau	Belgium / Germany
Nijmegen	Netherlands / Germany
Nordhorn	Germany / Netherlands
Oldenzaal	Netherlands / Germany
Prüm	Belgium / Germany / Luxembourg
Roermond	Netherlands / Germany
Roosendaal	Belgium / Luxembourg
Schengen/ Perl / Apach	Belgium / Germany / France
Schoonebeek	Netherlands / Germany
Sittard	Belgium / Germany / Netherlands
Sluis	Belgium / Luxembourg
St. Vith	Belgium / Germany / Luxembourg
Ter Apel	Netherlands / Germany
Vaals	Belgium / Germany / Netherlands
Venlo	Netherlands / Germany
Vreden	Germany / Netherlands
Winterswijk	Netherlands / Germany
Zevenaar	Netherlands / Germany
Zundert	Belgium / Luxembourg

==== Disputed City ====
Border towns	Notes
Nicosia/North Nicosia	Turkish Republic of Northern Cyprus is a de facto state with almost no international recognition, with Turkey being the only UN member state to recognize its sovereignty.

=== North America ===
Border towns	Bordering countries
Benque Viejo del Carmen	Belize /Guatemala
Chetumal	Mexico / Belize
Ciudad Hidalgo, Chiapas /Ciudad Tecun Uman	Mexico / Guatemala
Corozal Town	Belize / Mexico
Melchor de Mencos	Belize / Guatemala
Hyder, Alaska / Stewart, British Columbia	United States /Canada
Juneau, Alaska	United States /Canada
Point Roberts, Washington / Tsawwassen, British Columbia	United States /Canada
Blaine, Washington / Surrey, British Columbia	United States /Canada
Sumas, Washington / Abbotsford, British Columbia	United States /Canada
Laurier, Washington / Cascade City	United States /Canada
Sweetgrass, Montana / Coutts, Alberta	United States /Canada
Portal, North Dakota / North Portal, Saskatchewan	United States /Canada
Gretna, Manitoba	United States /Canada
Pembina, North Dakota / Emerson, Manitoba	United States /Canada
Noyes, Minnesota / Emerson, Manitoba	United States /Canada
Baudette, Minnesota / Rainy River, Ontario	United States /Canada
Emo, Ontario	United States /Canada
International Falls, Minnesota, Ranier, Minnesota / Fort Frances, Ontario	United States /Canada
Sault Ste. Marie, Michigan / Sault Ste. Marie, Ontario	United States /Canada
Grosse Ile Township, Michigan / Amherstburg, Ontario	United States /Canada
Wyotte, Michigan, Ecorse, Michigan / LaSalle, Ontario	United States /Canada
Detroit, Michigan, River Rouge, Michigan / Windsor, Ontario	United States /Canada
Algonac, Michigan	United States /Canada
Port Lambton, Ontario	United States /Canada
Marine City, Michigan / Sombra, Ontario	United States /Canada
East China Township, Michigan	United States /Canada
St. Clair, Michigan	United States /Canada
Marysville, Michigan	United States /Canada
Port Huron, Michigan / Sarnia, Ontario	United States /Canada
Buffalo, New York / Fort Erie, Ontario	United States /Canada
Niagara Falls, New York, Youngstown, New York / Niagara Falls, Ontario	United States /Canada
Lewiston, New York / Queenston, Ontario	United States /Canada
Cape Vincent, New York / Wolfe Island, Ontario	United States /Canada
Morristown, New York / Brockville, Ontario	United States /Canada
Ogdensburg, New York, Johnstown, Ontario / Prescott, Ontario	United States /Canada
Massena, New York / Cornwall, Ontario	United States /Canada
Waddington (village), New York	United States /Canada
Morrisburg, Ontario	United States /Canada
St. Regis, New York / Akwesasne, Quebec	United States /Canada
Fort Covington, New York / Dundee, Quebec	United States /Canada
Champlain, New York / Saint-Bernard-de-Lacolle, Quebec	United States /Canada
Rouses Point, New York	United States /Canada
Canaan, Vermont	United States /Canada
Derby Line, Vermont / Rock Isl/, Quebec	United States /Canada
Norton, Vermont / Stanhope, Quebec	United States /Canada
Estcourt Station, Maine / Pohénégamook, Quebec	United States /Canada
Fort Kent, Maine / Clair, New Brunswick	United States /Canada
Frenchville, Maine	United States /Canada
Madawaska, Maine / Edmundston, New Brunswick	United States /Canada
Van Buren, Maine / St. Leonard, New Brunswick	United States /Canada
Hamlin, Maine	United States /Canada
Limestone, Maine	United States /Canada
Fort Fairfield, Maine	United States /Canada
Easton, Maine	United States /Canada
Mars Hill, Maine	United States /Canada
Blaine, Maine	United States /Canada
Bridgewater, Maine	United States /Canada
Monticello, Maine	United States /Canada
Littleton, Maine	United States /Canada
Houlton, Maine / Woodstock, New Brunswick	United States /Canada
Hodgdon, Maine	United States /Canada
Cary, Maine	United States /Canada
Amity, Maine	United States /Canada
Orient, Maine	United States /Canada
Weston, Maine	United States /Canada
Danforth, Maine	United States /Canada
Baileyville, Maine	United States /Canada
Vanceboro, Maine / St. Croix, New Brunswick	United States /Canada
Baring Plantation, Maine	United States /Canada
Calais, Maine / St. Stephen, New Brunswick	United States /Canada
Robbinston, Maine	United States /Canada
Perry, Maine	United States /Canada
Eastport, Maine / Deer Island, New Brunswick	United States /Canada
Lubec, Maine / Campobello Island, New Brunswick	United States /Canada
San Diego, California / Tijuana, Baja California	United States / Mexico
Tecate, Baja California	United States / Mexico
Calexico, California / Mexicali, Baja California	United States / Mexico
Gadsden, Arizona	United States / Mexico
San Luis, Arizona / San Luis Río Colorado, Sonora/Los Algodones, Baja California	United States / Mexico
Yuma, Arizona / Los Algodones, Baja California	United States / Mexico
Sonoyta, Sonora	United States / Mexico
Naco, Arizona / Naco, Sonora	United States / Mexico
Nogales, Arizona / Nogales, Sonora	United States / Mexico
Douglas, Arizona / Agua Prieta, Sonora	United States / Mexico
Columbus, New Mexico / Puerto Palomas, Chihuahua	United States / Mexico
Sunland Park, New Mexico / Ciudad Juárez, Chihuahua	United States / Mexico
El Paso, Texas / Ciudad Juárez, Chihuahua	United States / Mexico
Socorro, Texas	United States / Mexico
San Elizario, Texas	United States / Mexico
Doctor Porfirio Parra	United States / Mexico
Tornillo, Texas	United States / Mexico
Presidio, Texas / Ojinaga, Chihuahua	United States / Mexico
Boquillas del Carmen	United States / Mexico
Del Rio, Texas / Ciudad Acuña, Coahuila	United States / Mexico
Eagle Pass, Texas / Piedras Negras, Coahuila	United States / Mexico
Rosita, Texas	United States / Mexico
Hidalgo, Coahuila	United States / Mexico
Colombia, Nuevo León	United States / Mexico
Laredo, Texas / Nuevo Laredo, Tamaulipas	United States / Mexico
El Cenizo, Texas	United States / Mexico
San Ygnacio, Texas	United States / Mexico
Falcon Mesa, Texas	United States / Mexico
Siesta Shores, Texas	United States / Mexico
Salineño, Texas	United States / Mexico
Roma, Texas / Ciudad Miguel Alemán, Tamaulipas	United States / Mexico
Escobares, Texas	United States / Mexico
La Rosita, Texas	United States / Mexico
Los Alvarez, Texas	United States / Mexico
Los Villareales, Texas	United States / Mexico
Rio Grande City, Texas	United States / Mexico
La Grulla, Texas	United States / Mexico
Los Ebanos, Texas / Gustavo Díaz Ordaz, Tamaulipas	United States / Mexico
Mission, Texas	United States / Mexico
McAllen, Texas	United States / Mexico
Hidalgo, Texas / Reynosa, Tamaulipas	United States / Mexico
Edinburg, Texas	United States / Mexico
Pharr, Texas / Reynosa, Tamaulipas	United States / Mexico
Progreso Lakes, Texas / Nuevo Progreso, Río Bravo, Tamaulipas	United States / Mexico
Río Rico, Tamaulipas	United States / Mexico
Bluetown-Iglesia Antigua, Texas	United States / Mexico
Encantada-Ranchito El Calaboz, Texas	United States / Mexico
Brownsville, Texas / Matamoros, Tamaulipas	United States / Mexico

=== Oceania ===
Border towns	Bordering countries
Vanimo	Papua New Guinea /Indonesia
Jayapura	Papua New Guinea /Indonesia

=== South America ===
Border towns	Bordering countries
Alberdi and Formosa	Paraguay / Argentina
Artigas and Quaraí	Uruguay / Brazil
Chuí and Chuy	Uruguay / Brazil
Jaguarão and Río Branco	Uruguay / Brazil
Santana do Livramento and Rivera	Uruguay / Brazil
Assis Brasil, Bolpebra, and Iñapari	Brazil / Bolivia / Peru
Barra do Quaraí, Bella Unión and Monte Caseros	Brazil / Uruguay / Argentina
Brasiléia/Epitaciolândia and Cobija	Brazil / Bolivia
Corumbá and Puerto Suárez	Brazil / Bolivia
Colón and Paysandú	Argentina / Uruguay
Concordia and Salto	Argentina / Uruguay
Cúcuta and San Antonio del Táchira	Colombia / Venezuela
Desaguadero	Bolivia / Peru
Fray Bentos and Gualeguaychú	Uruguay / Argentina
La Quiaca and Villazón	Argentina / Bolivia
Pacaraima and Santa Elena de Uairén	Brazil / Venezuela
Paso de los Libres and Uruguaiana	Argentina / Uruguay
Ponta Porã and Pedro Juan Caballero	Brazil / Paraguay
Posadas and Encarnación	Argentina / Paraguay
Puerto Iguazú, Foz do Iguaçu and Ciudad del Este	Argentina / Brazil / Paraguay
Santo Tomé and São Borja	Argentina / Brazil
Tabatinga and Leticia	Brazil / Colombia
Tulcán and Ipiales	Ecuador / Colombia
Yacuíba and Salvador Mazza	Bolivia / Argentina

== List of internal border towns and cities ==
=== Australia ===
Border towns	Bordering states and territories
Albury and Wodonga (Albury–Wodonga)	New South Wales / Victoria
Bordertown	South Australia / Victoria
Canberra and Queanbeyan	New South Wales / Australian Capital Territory
Corowa and Wahgunyah	New South Wales / Victoria
Echuca and Moama	New South Wales / Victoria
Mildura and Buronga	New South Wales / Victoria
Mulwala and Yarrawonga	New South Wales / Victoria
Tweed Heads and Gold Coast	New South Wales / Queensland
Mungindi	New South Wales / Queensland
Wallangarra, Jennings	New South Wales / Queensland

=== Canada ===
Border towns	Bordering Provinces
Lloydminster	Alberta / Saskatchewan
Flin Flon, Creighton, and Flin Flon	Manitoba / Saskatchewan
Ottawa and Gatineau	Ontario / Quebec
Hawkesbury and Grenville	Ontario / Quebec
Chute-à-Blondeau (East Hawkesbury) and Pointe-Fortune	Ontario / Quebec
Bainsville (South Glengarry) and Rivière-Beaudette	Ontario / Quebec
Pembroke and Chapeau	Ontario / Quebec
Campbellton and Pointe-à-la-Croix	New Brunswick / Quebec

=== Colombia ===
Border towns	Bordering Departments
Soacha	Cundinamarca / Bogotá
Yondó and Antioquía	Barrancabermeja / Santander
Puerto Triunfo and Puerto Boyacá	Boyacá / Antioquia
Cartago, Pereira and Puerto Caldas	Valle del Cauca / Risaralda
Palermo Sitionuevo and Barranquilla	Magdalena/Atlántico
Girardot, Flandes and Ricaurte	Cundinamarca / Tolima
Puerto Salgar, and La Dorada	Cundinamarca / Caldas
Barbosa and Moniquirá	Santander / Boyacá
Puerto Bogotá and Honda	Cundinamarca / Tolima

=== United Kingdom ===
Border towns	Bordering countries
Berwick-upon-Tweed	England / Scotland
Carlisle	England / Scotland
Coldstream	England / Scotland
Eyemouth	England / Scotland
Gretna	England / Scotland
Longtown	England / Scotland
Bishop's Castle	England / Wales
Chepstow	England / Wales
Chester	England / Wales
Chirk	England / Wales
Hay-on-Wye	England / Wales
Kington	England / Wales
Knighton	England / Wales
Monmouth	England / Wales
Montgomery	England / Wales
Oswestry	England / Wales
Presteigne	England / Wales
Saltney	England / Wales
Whitchurch	England / Wales
Wrexham	England / Wales

=== United States ===
Border towns	Bordering states and territories
Ardmore and Ardmore	Tennessee / Alabama
Lanett and West Point	Georgia (U.S. state) / Alabama
Flomaton and Century	Florida / / Alabama
Florala and Paxton	Florida / / Alabama
Phenix City and Columbus	Georgia (U.S. state) / Alabama
Bluewater and Bluewater	Arizona / California
Bullhead City and Laughlin	Arizona / Nevada
Colorado City and Hildale	Arizona / Utah
Ehrenberg and Blythe	Arizona / California
Fort Defiance	Arizona / New Mexico
Fredonia and Kanab	Arizona / Utah
Mohave Valley and Needles	Arizona / California
Oljato-Monument Valley	Arizona / Utah
Parker	Arizona / California
Teec Nos Pos	Arizona / New Mexico
Window Rock	Arizona / New Mexico
Yuma and Winterhaven	Arizona / California
Fort Smith and Arkoma	Arkansas / Oklahoma
Texarkana and Texarkana	Arkansas / Texas
West Memphis, Southaven and Memphis	Arkansas / Mississippi / Tennessee
Kings Beach and Incline Village	California / Nevada
New Pine Creek and New Pine Creek	California / Oregon
South Lake Tahoe and Stateline	California / Nevada
Tulelake	California / Oregon
Verdi and Verdi	California / Nevada
Julesburg	Colorado / Nebraska
Greenwich and Port Chester	Connecticut / New York
Pawcatuck and Westerly	Connecticut / Rhode Island
Delmar and Delmar	Delaware / Maryland
Marydel and Marydel	Delaware / Maryland
Washington, D.C., Oxon Hill, and Alexandria	District of Columbia// Maryland / Virginia
Chattahoochee	Florida / Georgia (U.S. state)
Esto	Florida /Alabama
Jennings	Florida / Georgia (U.S. state)
Pensacola	Florida /Alabama
Augusta and North Augusta	Georgia (U.S. state) / South Carolina
Rossville and Chattanooga	Tennessee / Georgia (U.S. state)
St. Marys	Georgia (U.S. state) / Florida
Fruitland and Ontario	Idaho / Oregon
Lewiston and Clarkston	Idaho / Washington
Moscow and Pullman	Idaho / Washington
Oldtown and Newport	Idaho / Washington
Post Falls and Liberty Lake	Idaho / Washington
Payette	Idaho / Oregon
Weiser	Idaho / Oregon
Chicago and Hammond	Illinois / Indiana
East St. Louis and St. Louis	Illinois / Missouri
The Quad Cities: Rock Islands, Moline, East Moline, Davenport, and Bettendorf	Illinois / Iowa
Jeffersonville and Louisville, Kentucky	Indiana / Kentucky
Michiana Shores and Michiana	Indiana / Michigan
New Albany and Louisville	Indiana / Kentucky
Union City and Union City	Indiana / Ohio
Council Bluffs and Omaha	Iowa / Nebraska
Dubuque and East Dubuques	Iowa / Illinois
Sioux City, South Sioux City, and North Sioux City	Iowa / Nebraska / South Dakota
Overland Park, Kansas City (KCK), Leawood, Prairie Village, Mission Hills, Westwood, Westwood Hills, Mission Woods and Kansas City	Kansas / Missouri
Covington and Cincinnati	Kentucky / Ohio
Fort Campbell and Clarksville	Tennessee / Kentucky
Fulton and South Fulton	Tennessee/Kentucky
Vidalia and Natchez	Louisiana / Mississippi
Kittery and Portsmouth,	Maine / New Hampshire
Cumberland and Ridgeley	Maryland / West Virginia
Knoxville and Harper's Ferry	Maryland / West Virginia
Fall River and North Tiverton	Massachusetts / Rhode Island
South Attleboro and Pawtucket	Massachusetts / Rhode Island
Ironwood and Hurley	Michigan / Wisconsin
Lambertville and Toledo	Michigan / Ohio
Lost Peninsula and Toledo	Michigan / Ohio
St. Vincent and Pembina	Minnesota / North Dakota
Breckenridge and Wahpeton	Minnesota / North Dakota
Duluth and Superior	Minnesota / Wisconsin
East Grand Forks and Grand Forks	Minnesota / North Dakota
La Crescent and La Crosse	Minnesota / Wisconsin
Lakeland and Hudson	Minnesota / Wisconsin
Moorhead and Fargo	Minnesota / North Dakota
St. Vincent and Pembina	Minnesota / North Dakota
Winona	Minnesota / Wisconsin
Fairview	Montana / North Dakota
Westby	Minnesota / South Dakota
Henry	Nebraska / Wyoming
Whiteclay and Pine Ridge	Nebraska / South Dakota
Denio	Nevada / Oregon
Jackpot	Nevada / Idaho
McDermitt	Nevada / Oregon
Mesquite	Nevada / Arizona
Owyhee	Nevada / Idaho
Primm	Nevada / California
West Wendover and Wendover	Nevada / Utah
Nashua	New Hampshire / Massachusetts
Camden and Philadelphia	New Jersey / Pennsylvania
Carteret and New York City	New Jersey / New York
Edgewater and New York City	New Jersey / New York
Elizabeth and New York City	New Jersey / New York
Englewood Cliffs and New York City	New Jersey / New York
Guttenberg and New York City	New Jersey / New York
Hoboken and New York City	New Jersey / New York
Jersey City and New York City	New Jersey / New York
Lambertville and New Hope	New Jersey / Pennsylvania
Linden and New York City	New Jersey / New York
North Bergen and New York City	New Jersey / New York
Perth Amboy and New York City	New Jersey / New York
Phillipsburg and Easton	New Jersey / Pennsylvania
Trenton and Morrisville	New Jersey / Pennsylvania
Weehawken and New York City	New Jersey / New York
West New York and New York City	New Jersey / New York
Woodbridge Township and New York City	New Jersey / New York
Anthony and Anthony	Texas / New Mexico
Sunland Park and El Paso	Texas / New Mexico
Texico and Farwell	Texas / New Mexico
Waverly and South Waverly	New York / Pennsylvania
Charlotte and Fort Mill	North Carolina / South Carolina
Bridgeport and Wheeling	Ohio / West Virginia
Proctorville and Huntington	Ohio / West Virginia
Pocola	Oklahoma / Arkansas
Rock Island	Oklahoma / Arkansas
Hood River and White Salmon	Oregon / Washington
Jordan Valley	Oregon / Idaho
Milton-Freewater and Walla Walla	Oregon / Washington
Nyssa	Oregon / Idaho
Portland and Vancouver	Oregon / Washington
The Dalles and Dallesport	Oregon / Washington
Umatilla	Oregon / Washington
Point Marion and Morgantown	Pennsylvania / West Virginia
Lemmon	South Dakota / North Dakota
Yankton	South Dakota / Nebraska
Bristol and Bristol	Tennessee / Virginia
Canutillo	Texas / New Mexico
El Paso	Texas / New Mexico
Orange	Texas / Louisiana
Cornish	Utah / Montana
Cove	Utah / Idaho
Lewiston	Utah / Idaho
Manila	Utah / Wyoming
Portage	Utah / Idaho
St. George	Utah / Arizona
Bluefield and Bluefield	West Virginia / Virginia
Weirton and Stuebenville	West Virginia / Ohio
Asotin	Washington / Idaho
Beloit and South Beloits	Wisconsin / Illinois
Pine Bluffs	Wyoming / Nebraska

== See also ==
- Border towns in the United States with portmanteau names
- Cross-border town naming
- Divided cities
- Transborder agglomeration
- List of seaports
- List of Mexico–United States border crossings
- List of Canada–United States border crossings
