= Bulok =

Bulok may refer to:

- Bulok, Gambia
- Bulok, Tajikistan
