= La Dorada =

La Dorada may refer to:

- La Dorada, Caldas, a municipality in the Department of Caldas, Colombia.
- La Dorada, Catamarca, a municipality in Catamarca Province in northwestern Argentina.
