= Our Lady of Mount Carmel Cathedral, La Dorada =

Our Lady of Mount Carmel Cathedral
- Catedral Nuestra Señora del Carmen
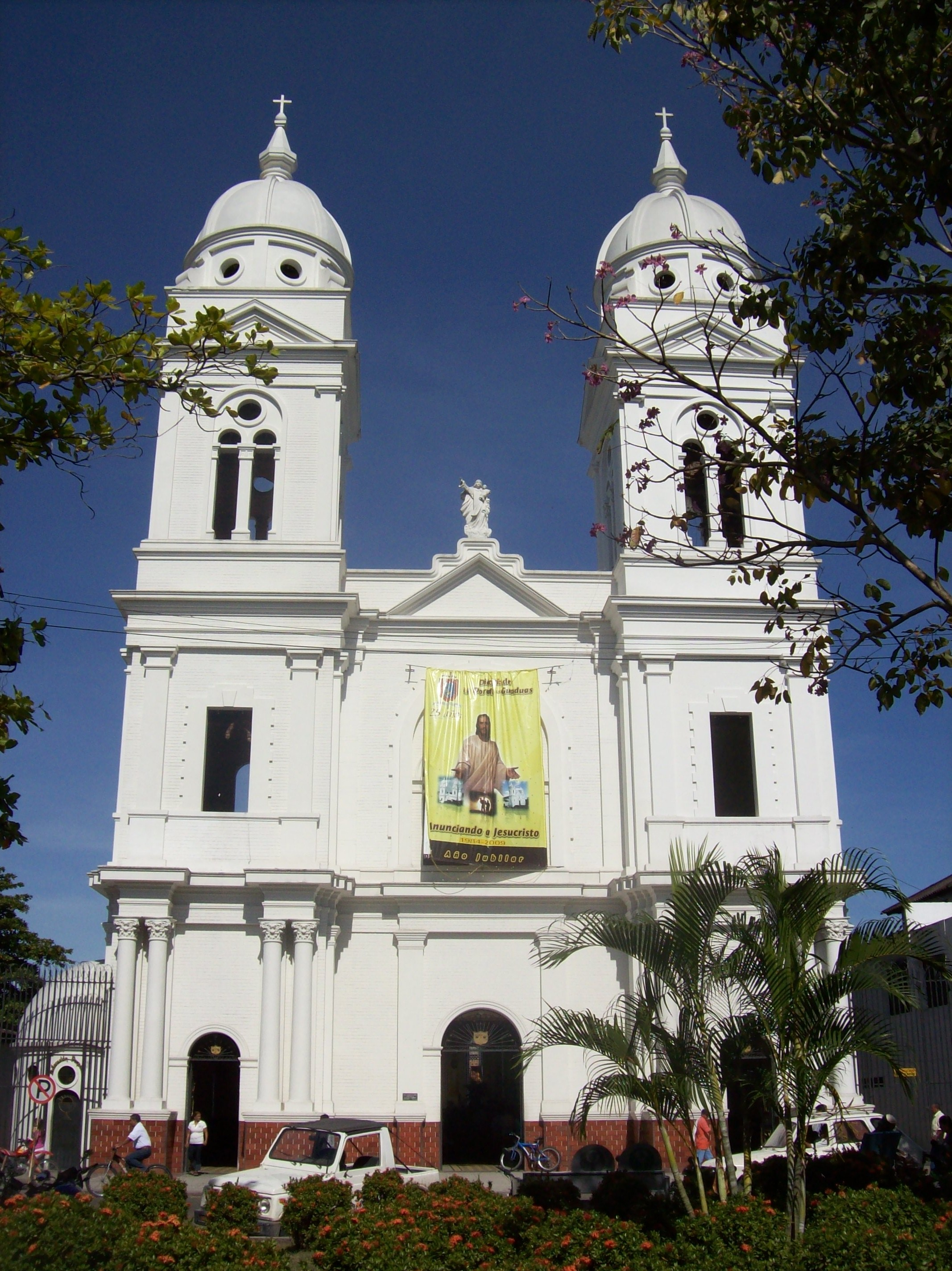
- Our Lady of Mount Carmel Cathedral
- 5°27′14″N 74°39′50″W
- Location: La Dorada
- Country: Colombia
- Denomination: Roman Catholic Church

Administration
- Diocese: Roman Catholic Diocese of La Dorada–Guaduas

The Our Lady of Mount Carmel Cathedral (Spanish: Catedral Nuestra Señora del Carmen), also La Dorada Cathedral, is the main Catholic cathedral of the Diocese of La Dorada-Guaduas, located opposite the Simón Bolívar Park or Las Iguanas Park, in the town of La Dorada, Caldas, Colombia. This religious building dates back to the middle of the 20th century. Stylistically it has Romanesque and neoclassic features that are evidenced in semicircular arches, columns of Greek influence, volumetric symmetry and the plant of three naves. The visitor can see, in its interior, an image representative of the Virgin of the Carmen and the Divine Child.

It is definitely the biggest point of reference for the location within the municipality. Its beautiful structure both inside and outside, invites you to enjoy its architectural beauty. As a historical heritage of La Dorada, it is also a meeting point for the community and for all those who wish to have a space dedicated to spirituality.

== See also ==
- Roman Catholicism in Colombia
- List of cathedrals in Colombia
- Our Lady of Mount Carmel
