= El Longoreño =

Border town in Mexico

El Longoreño Spanish: El Longoreño
- Border Town
- Location within Mexico
- Coordinates: 25°50′2″N 97°23′51″W
- Country: Mexico
- State: Tamaulipas

Population
  - Total: 638
- Time zone: UTC-5 (CT)
- Area code: 76Q4RJM2+HX

El Longoreño is a border town in Mexico. It is located in the Matamoros region. Many migrants from Mexico cross into the United States via Texas.
