= Banga-Boumbé =

- Location in Central African Republic
- Coordinates: 4°42′5″N 14°43′15″E
- Country: Central African Republic
- Prefecture: Mambéré
- Sub-prefecture: Amada-Gaza
- Commune: Haute-Boumbé

Banga-Boumbé (also known as Banga-Mboumbé or Banga) is a village located in Mambéré Prefecture, Central African Republic. The village borders with Cameroon.

== History ==
Hundred of Siriri militias were reportedly roaming in Banga-Boumbé on 15 November 2018. This led the villagers to flee to Amada-Gaza.

On 13 September 2021, FACA and Wagner captured Banga-Boumbé from rebels, causing the villagers to seek refuge in Cameroon. However, CPC recaptured the village on 20 September 2021. Wagner later seized the village.

== Healthcare ==
The village has one health post.
