= Gnato =

Gnato Gnanto
- Village
- Location in Ivory Coast
- Coordinates: 4°26′N 7°32′W
- Country: Ivory Coast
- District: Bas-Sassandra
- Region: San-Pédro
- Department: Tabou
- Sub-prefecture: Djamandioké
- Time zone: UTC+0 (GMT)

Gnato (also spelled Gnanto) is a village in the south-western corner of Ivory Coast. It is in the sub-prefecture of Djamandioké, Tabou Department, San-Pédro Region, Bas-Sassandra District. The village sits on the east bank of the Cavalla River, which forms the border between Ivory Coast and Liberia.

Gnato was a commune until March 2012, when it became one of 1,126 communes nationwide that were abolished.
