= Semalka Border Crossing =

Bridge in Faysh Khabur, Kurdistan Region

Semalka Border Crossing معبر سيمالكا الحدودي دەروازەی سنووریی سێمالکە
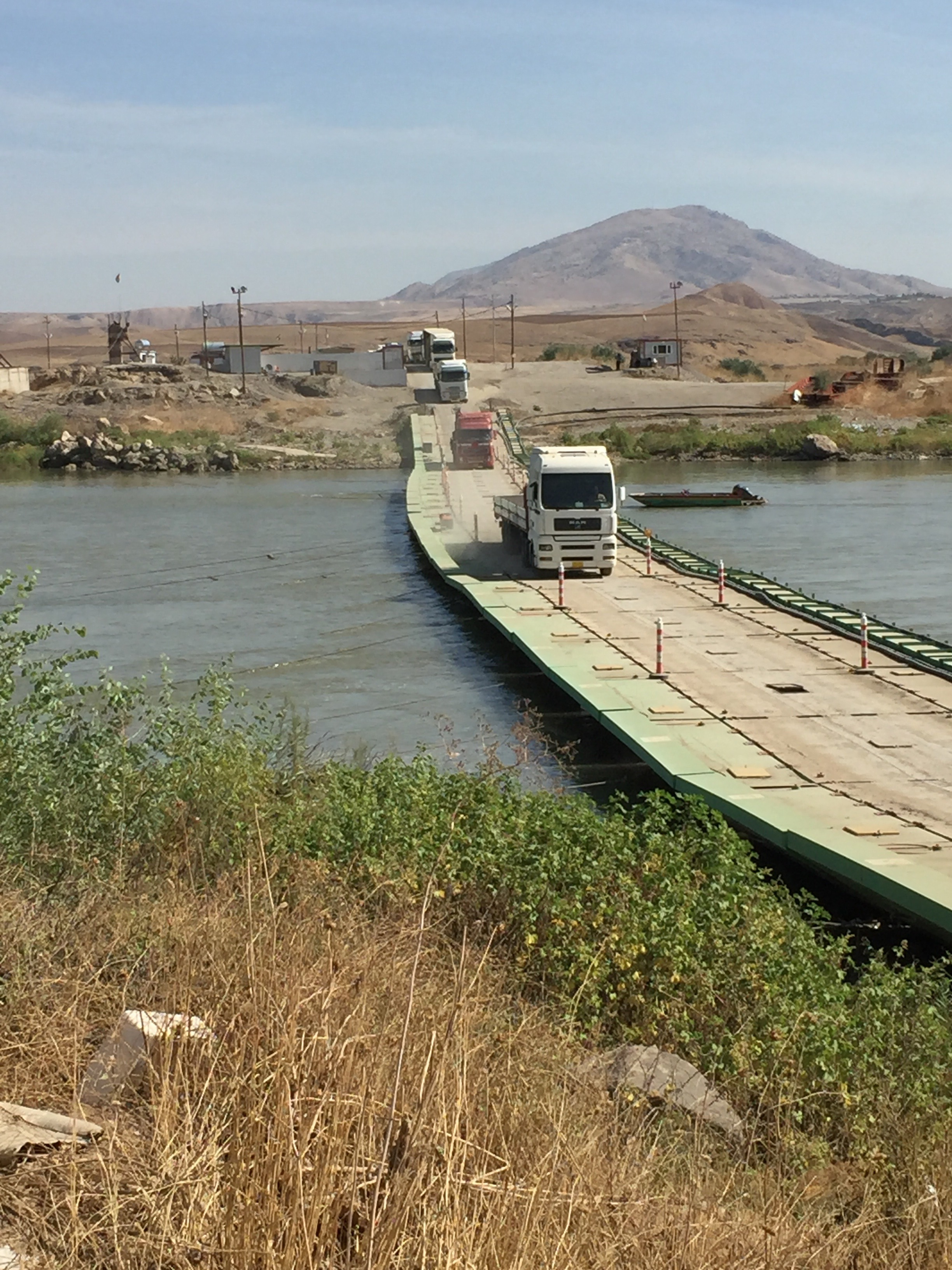
- Border crossing at Semalka between Kurdistan and Syria on the Tigris River for trading food, oil, electronics, and other goods.
- Coordinates: 37.089323°N 42.349890°E
- Carries: Pedestrians, vehicles, containers
- Crosses: Tigris River
- Locale: Khanik, Syria; Faysh Khabur, Kurdistan Region, Iraq
- Begins: Khanik, Syria
- Ends: Faysh Khabur, Kurdistan Region, Iraq
- Official name: Semalka Border Crossing
- Maintained by: (Syria) General Authority for Borders and Customs (Kurdistan Region) Kurdistan Regional Government
- Website: semalka.com

Characteristics
- Design: Pontoon bridge
- Traversable?: Yes

History
- Opened: Permanently open since June 2016

Statistics
- Daily traffic: Trade (food, oil, electronics, and other goods)

Location
- Interactive map of Semalka Border Crossing

Semalka Border Crossing (Arabic: معبر سيمالكا الحدودي, romanized: Menfath Simalka al-Hudoodi; Kurdish: دەروازەی سنووریی سێمالکە, romanized: Derwazeî Snûrîî Sêmalka), is a border crossing established between the Kurdistan Region in Iraq and the Kurdish-led Autonomous Administration of North and East Syria, in 2012, during the Syrian Civil War. It is located about 1 km downstream from the Iraqi–Syrian–Turkish tripoint and just north of Faysh Khabur in Iraq and Khanik in Syria, and consists of a pontoon bridge across the river Tigris.

The border crossing has been intermittently closed by the Kurdistan Regional Government (KRG), but has been open permanently since June 2016, and economic exchange has since then begun to normalize between Northeastern Syria and the Kurdistan Region.

In a February 2026 interview, the SDF Commander Mazloum Abdi stated that Syrian officials would set up a office there to work with existing staff to keep the border crossing operational. This move was part of an integration agreement reached between the Syrian transitional government (STG) and the Syrian Democratic Forces. An STG delegation visited the crossing on March 4 as part of the preparations for integrating the crossing into the national border crossings network. The bridge was collapsed in mid-March 2026, amid heavy rains, but was expected to be reopened by the end of the month. However, when the crossing's integration under the national government was reported complete a month later, the bridge was not fully repaired, and a neighboring crossing was being used temporarily. The Semalka crossing was reportedly now operating under the control of the STG, with "some previous employees" retained.

== See also ==
- Faysh Khabur
- Khanik
