= Diocese of La Dorada–Guaduas =

Diocese of the Catholic Church in Colombia

Coordinates: 5.4541°N 74.6640°W

Diocese of La Dorada–Guaduas Dioecesis Aureatensis-Guaduensis

Catholic
- Ecclesiastical Coat of Arms of the Diocese of La Dorada-Guaduas

Location
- Country: Colombia
- Ecclesiastical province: Roman Catholic Archdiocese of Manizales
- Metropolitan: La Dorada, Caldas

Statistics
- Area: 8,040 km^{2} (3,100 sq mi)
- Population: Total: (as of 2004); 294,000

Information
- Denomination: Roman Catholic
- Rite: Latin Rite
- Established: March 29, 1984
- Cathedral: Our Lady of Mount Carmel Cathedral, La Dorada
- Co-cathedral: Cathedral of Saint Michael the Archangel of Guaduas
- Patron saint: Our Lady of Mount Carmel

Current leadership
- Pope: Leo XIV
- Bishop: Hency Martínez Vargas
- Metropolitan Archbishop: Gonzalo Restrepo Restrepo
- Bishops emeritus: Oscar Aníbal Salazar Gómez

Map

Website
- diocesisdeladoradaguaduas.org

The Roman Catholic Diocese of La Dorada–Guaduas (Latin: Aureatensis-Guaduensis) is a diocese located in the cities of La Dorada and Guaduas in the ecclesiastical province of Manizales in Colombia.

== History ==
- 29 March 1984: Established as Diocese of La Dorada – Guaduas from the Diocese of Barrancabermeja, Diocese of Facatativá and Metropolitan Archdiocese of Manizales

== Cathedral ==
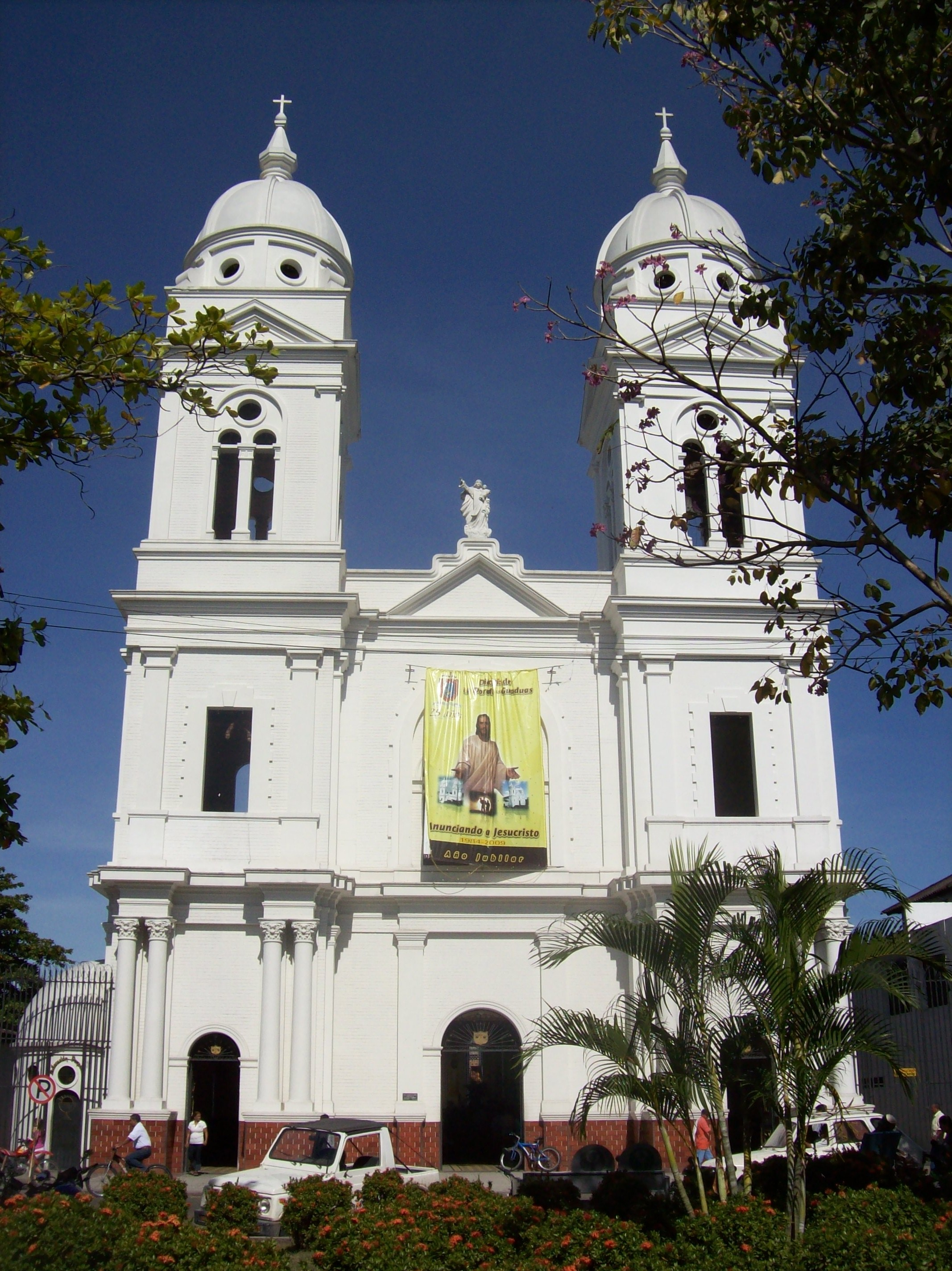
Facade of Our Lady of Mount Carmel of La Dorada Cathedral.

== Bishops ==
=== Ordinaries ===
- Fabio Betancur Tirado (1984.03.29 – 1996.10.15), appointed Archbishop of Manizales
- Oscar Aníbal Salazar Gómez (1999.06.05 – 2019.01.13)
- Hency Martínez Vargas (2019.01.13 - present)

=== Other priests of this diocese who became bishops ===
- Nelson Jair Cardona Ramírez, appointed Bishop of San José del Guaviare in 2016
- Ovidio Giraldo Velásquez, appointed Bishop of Barrancabermeja in 2020

== See also ==
- Roman Catholicism in Colombia
