= La Dorada, Catamarca =

Coordinates: 29°15′S 65°28′W

La Dorada
- Municipality and village
- Interactive map of La Dorada
- Country: Argentina
- Province: Catamarca Province
- Time zone: UTC−3 (ART)

La Dorada is a village and municipality in Catamarca Province in northwestern Argentina.
