= Amada-Gaza =

- sub-prefectures
- Location in Central African Republic
- Coordinates: 4.8°N 15.2°E
- Country: Central African Republic

Government
  - Sub-Prefect: Dieudonné Baka

Amada-Gaza is a sub-prefecture of Mambéré in the Central African Republic.

== Geography ==
The locality is located 130 km northwest of the capital of Berberati prefecture in the valley of the river Boumbé I, tributary of Kadéï.

== History ==
In 2002, the locality became chief town of one of the seven sub-prefectures of Mambéré-Kadeï, resulting from a division of the sub-prefecture of Gamboula. Since at least May 2014 Amada-Gaza had been under control of the Anti-balaka. French journalist Camille Lepage was killed while traveling there with militiamen. On 7 March 2021 it was recaptured by government forces.

== Administration ==
The sub-prefecture consists of the single commune of Haute-Boumbé. The locality of Amada-Gaza has 4,100 inhabitants in March 2015, including 800 displaced persons.
