= Djamandioké =

Town and sub-prefecture in Ivory Coast

Djamandioké Djamadjoké
- Town and sub-prefecture
- Location in Ivory Coast
- Coordinates: 4°24′N 7°28′W
- Country: Ivory Coast
- District: Bas-Sassandra
- Region: San-Pédro
- Department: Tabou

Population (2014)
  - Total: 15,006
- Time zone: UTC+0 (GMT)

Djamandioké (also spelled Djamadjoké) is a town in the south-western corner of Ivory Coast, near the border of Liberia. It is a sub-prefecture of Tabou Department in San-Pédro Region, Bas-Sassandra District. It is the southernmost sub-prefecture of the country.

Djamandioké was a commune until March 2012, when it became one of 1,126 communes nationwide that were abolished.

In 2014, the population of the sub-prefecture of Djamandioké was 15,006.

== Villages ==
The seventeen villages of the sub-prefecture of Djamandioké and their population in 2014 are:

1. Bliéron (336)
2. Boubré (229)
3. Djamandioké (1,337)
4. Djoutou (774)
5. Gnakanépo (112)
6. Iroutou (518)
7. Néro V1 (3 315)
8. Néro V2 (1 952)
9. Néro Village (692)
10. Pata-Idié (1,386)
11. Pimé (203)
12. Prollo (959)
13. Ranouinké/Georges-Town (1,351)
14. Soublaké (677)
15. Toupa (142)
16. Wépo (231)
17. Yeouli (792)
