= Bariguna =

- Location in South Sudan
- Coordinates: 05°16′38″N 27°18′10″E
- Country: South Sudan
- Region: Equatoria
- State: Western Equatoria
- County: Ezo County
- Payam: Bariguna
- Time zone: UTC+2 (CAT)

Bariguna is a village located near the border of Central African Republic - South Sudan in Western Equatoria, South Sudan.

== History ==
LRA attacked Bariguna on 24 June 2009. They kidnapped 20 villagers. Alleged LRA attacked the Ugandan military base in Bariguna on 13 October 2009. They also assassinated the son of Bariguna chief.

SPLM-IO established its base in Bariguna around May 2018 after suffering defeat from the SSDF forces in Nadiangere. Their presence in the village caused the displacement among villagers.

== Healthcare ==
The village has one health center. During the conflict, the armed group looted the health center's properties and medicines.
