= Faysh Khabur =

- Town
- Location within Iraq
- Coordinates: 37°4′5″N 42°22′39″E
- Country: Iraq
- Region: Kurdistan Region
- Governorate: Duhok

Faysh Khabur (Arabic: فيشخابور, Kurdish: پێشابوور, romanized: Pêşabûr Syriac: ܦܝܫ ܚܒܘܪ) is a town on the northwestern edge of the Kurdistan Region in the Zakho District of Duhok Governorate of Iraq. It is named after the Khabur River on which the town is built, and lies on the confluence of the Tigris and Khabur river. The town is in a very strategic location, as it lies just 4 km south from the Semalka Border Crossing with Syria as well as being close to the border with Turkey.

The town is populated by Assyrians and Yazidis.

== History ==
The town has been connected with the Sasanian city "Peroz-Shapur", and the modern name is thought to be influenced by the Persian one. The first mention of the settlement is attested as far as the 4th century AD, when it was recognized as a Christian village. Its Assyrian population joined the Chaldean Catholic Church in the 1830s. During the Assyrian genocide, the town was attacked by Kurdish irregulars allied with the Ottoman Empire, which left hundreds dead and forced the rest to flee to Mosul and Alqosh. Most of its inhabitants returned to their village during the Mandate for Mesopotamia. In 1913 there were approximately 1,300 Chaldean Catholics living in Faysh Khabur.

The village was subsequently attacked on three occasions. The first was during the Simele massacre in August 1933, when hundreds of its Assyrian inhabitants were attacked by the Iraqi Army. The second time the village was targeted was during the first Kurdish rebellion in 1961 by the Sindi Kurdish tribe, which forced the inhabitants to seek refuge in Khanik, the sister village of Faysh Khabur across the border in Syria, until 1975 when they returned. Only a year after returning, Faysh Khabur was attacked the third time when its population was forcibly evicted when the Ba’athist government of Iraq settled Arabs in the town as part of their Arabization campaigns. It was not until the 1991 uprisings that the Arabs left.

== See also ==
- Assyrians in Iraq
- Yazidis in Iraq
- Semalka Border Crossing
- Dayrabun
- Khanik
