= Bulok, Tajikistan =

Bulok
- Location in Tajikistan
- Coordinates: 40°36′N 70°27′E
- Country: Tajikistan
- Region: Sughd Region
- District: Asht District

Bulok is a village in northern Tajikistan. It is part of the Asht District in Sughd Region.
