= Al-Khalidiyah, al-Hasakah Governorate =

Al-Khalidiyah الخالدية Khanik ܚܢܝܟ
- Village
- Location within Syria
- Coordinates: 37°4′26″N 42°22′13″E
- Country: Syria
- Governorate: Al-Hasakah Governorate
- District: Al-Malikiyah District
- Nahiyah: Al-Malikiyah
- Control: Autonomous Administration of North and East Syria
- Time zone: UTC+3 (EET)
  - Summer (DST): UTC+2 (EEST)

Al-Khalidiyah (Arabic: الخالدية) or Khanik (Syriac: ܚܢܝܟ, romanized: Ḥanik; Arabic: خانيك; Kurdish: Xanike) is a village in the al-Hasakah Governorate in northeastern Syria. The village lies on the Tigris Khabur opposite to the Iraqi village of Faysh Khabur and is located 4 km south of the Semalka Border Crossing and just 3 km to the south of the tripoint of Iraq, Syria and Turkey. The village is also famous as the easternmost settlement of Syria. Khanik is inhabited by Assyrians belonging to the Chaldean Catholic Church and the Assyrian Church of the East. A number of Armenians also live in the village.

== See also ==
- Semalka Border Crossing
- Faysh Khabur
