= Bomandjokou =

- Location in Central African Republic
- Coordinates: 2°38′19″N 16°4′12″E
- Country: Central African Republic
- Prefecture: Sangha-Mbaéré
- Sub-prefecture: Bayanga
- Commune: Yobe-Sangha

Population (2021)
  - Total: 626

Bomandjokou, also spelled Bomandjoko or Bomadjokou, is a village situated within Dzanga-Sangha Special Reserve in Sangha-Mbaéré Prefecture, Central African Republic.

== History ==
The village chief demanded the expansion of the farming strip boundaries in October 2008 because the youths were unable to find places to farm.

In mid-October 2015, heavy rain poured on Bomandjokou, causing the village to flood. One hundred households were affected by the flood, and it forced them to seek refuge 2 KM from the village. Later, they returned after the flood receded.

== Demography ==
Bayaka people inhabit Bomandjokou.

== Economy ==
The villagers rely on hunting and the agriculture sector. There is also a market in the village.

== Education ==
Bomandjokou has one school.

== Healthcare ==
The village has one health post. However, the health post stopped its operation in 2011 because it did not receive any support.

== Bibliographies ==
- Maxime, Ngbo-Ngbangbo Louis; Jiwen, Ge; Alphonse, Nahayo (2010). "Assessment of Socioeconomic Factors and Stakeholders Involved in Dzanga Sangha Complex Protected Area, Central African Republic". Journal of Sustainable Development. 3 (2).
- Première Urgence Internationale (29 November 2015). Evaluation Multisectorielle RRM Rapport préliminaire - Bayanga et Bomandjoko (Sangha Mbaéré) du 27 au 29 novembre 2015 (PDF) (Report).
