= Bomassa =

- Location in the Republic of the Congo
- Coordinates: 2°12′12″N 16°11′8″E
- Country: Republic of the Congo
- Department: Sangha
- District: Kabo
- Elevation: 1,161 ft (354 m)

Bomassa is a town in the northern Republic of Congo, lying on the Sangha River and the border with the Cameroon. It is known for its local rainforests, home to a wide variety of large mammals. There have been repeated calls for its immediate area to be designated a national park.
