= Bulok, Gambia =

Bulok
- Location in the Gambia
- Coordinates: 13°10′36″N 16°24′57″W
- Country: The Gambia
- Division: Brikama

Population (2009)
  - Total: 2,312 (est.)

Bulok or Bulock is a small town in south-western Gambia. It is located in the Brikama Division. As of 2009, it has an estimated population of 2,312.
