= La Dorada, Caldas =

La Dorada
- Municipality and town
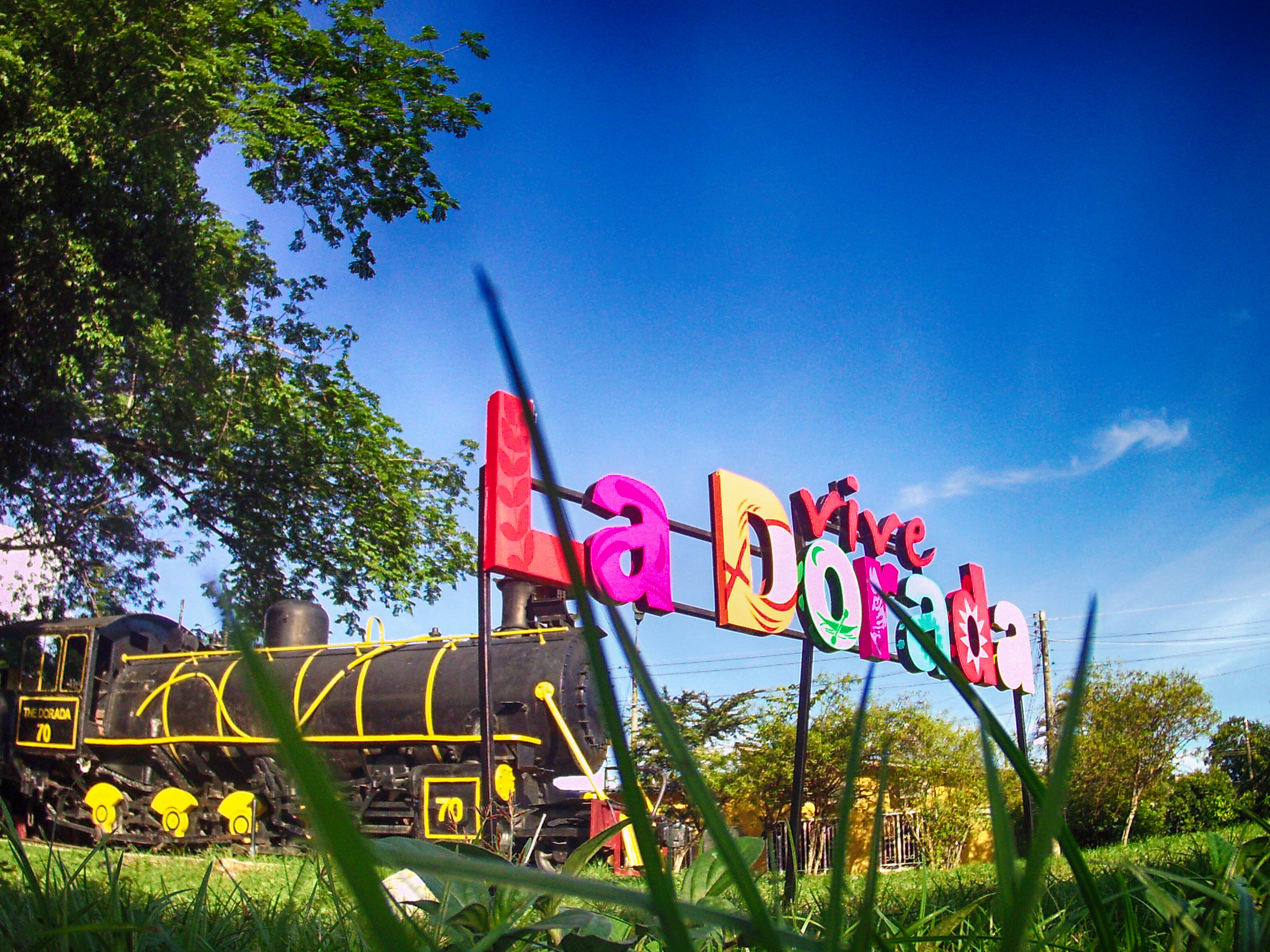
- Railway Company N°70

- Flag Coat of arms City Hall Logo
- Nicknames: Glorieta Nacional; Heart of Colombia; Cattle Queen
- Motto: "Hermandad y Amor"(in Spanish) "Brotherhood and Love"
- Anthem: Himno
- Location of the municipality and town of La Dorada, Caldas in the Caldas Department of Colombia.

- Location in Colombia
- Coordinates: 5°27′13.82″N 74°39′52.83″W
- Country: Colombia
- Department: Caldas Department
- District: Magdalena Caldense
- Founded: August 7, 1920
- Incorporated: August 7, 1923
- Founder: Antonio Acosta Gutiérrez

Government
  - Type: Mayor-council government
  - Mayor: Jhon Fredy Saldaña Leopardo

Area
  - Municipality and town: 549.2 km^{2} (212.0 sq mi)
  - Urban: 7.63 km^{2} (2.95 sq mi)
- Elevation: 176 m (577 ft)

Population (2018 census)
  - Municipality and town: 71,905
  - Density: 130.9/km^{2} (339.1/sq mi)
  - Urban: 62,536
  - Urban density: 8,200/km^{2} (21,200/sq mi)
- Demonym: Doradense (s) (in Spanish)
- Time zone: UTC-5 (Colombia Standard Time)
- Area code: 57 + 6
- Website: Official website (in Spanish)

La Dorada (Spanish pronunciation: [la ðoˈɾaða]) is a town and municipality in the Colombian Department of Caldas. It is the seat of the Roman Catholic Diocese of La Dorada–Guaduas. It is situated on the banks of Colombia's principal river, the Magdalena.

The city's economy is based primarily on livestock, fishing, and tourism.

== Gallery ==
Government of La Dorada
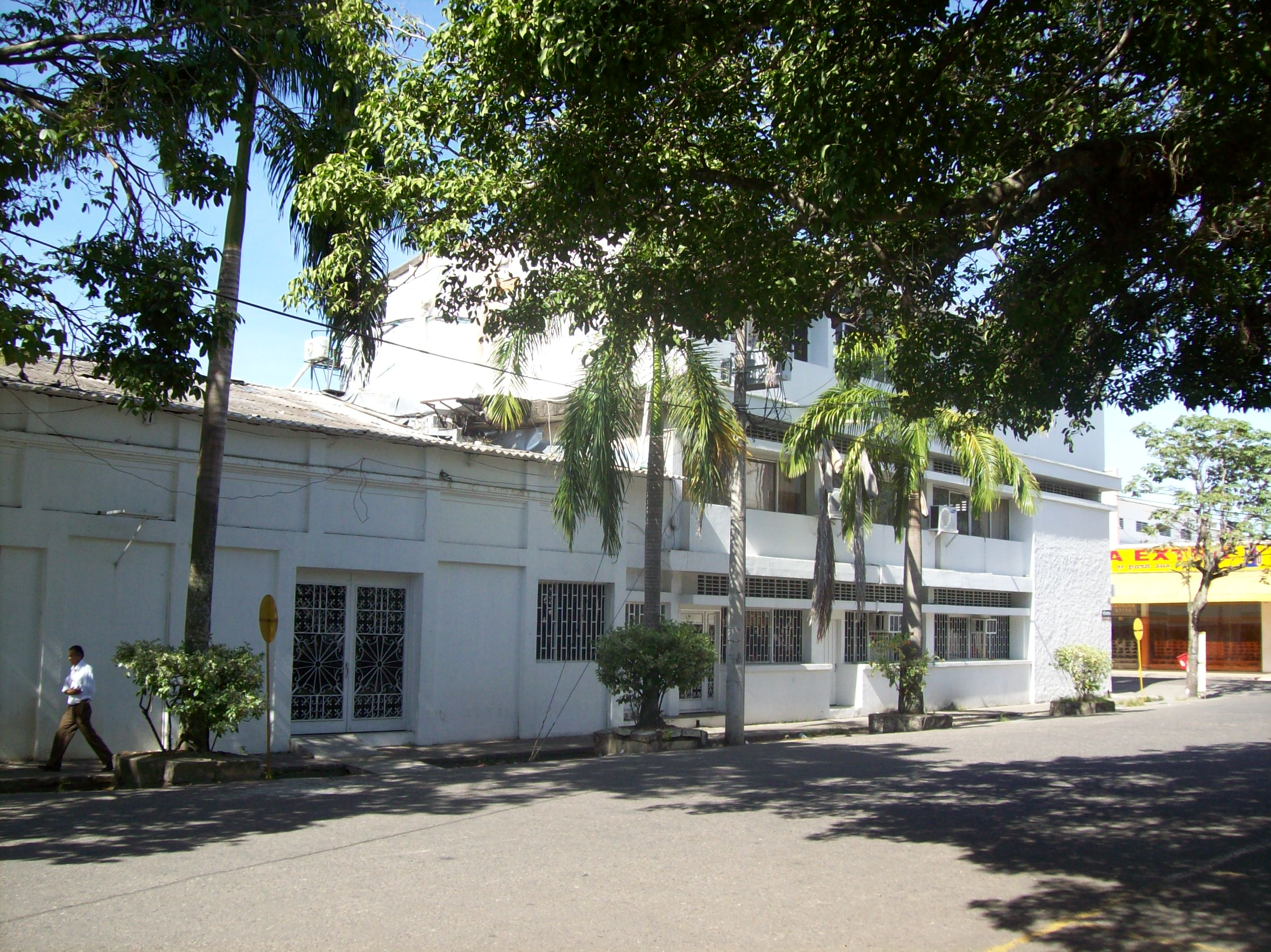
Municipal Mayor's Office Building.

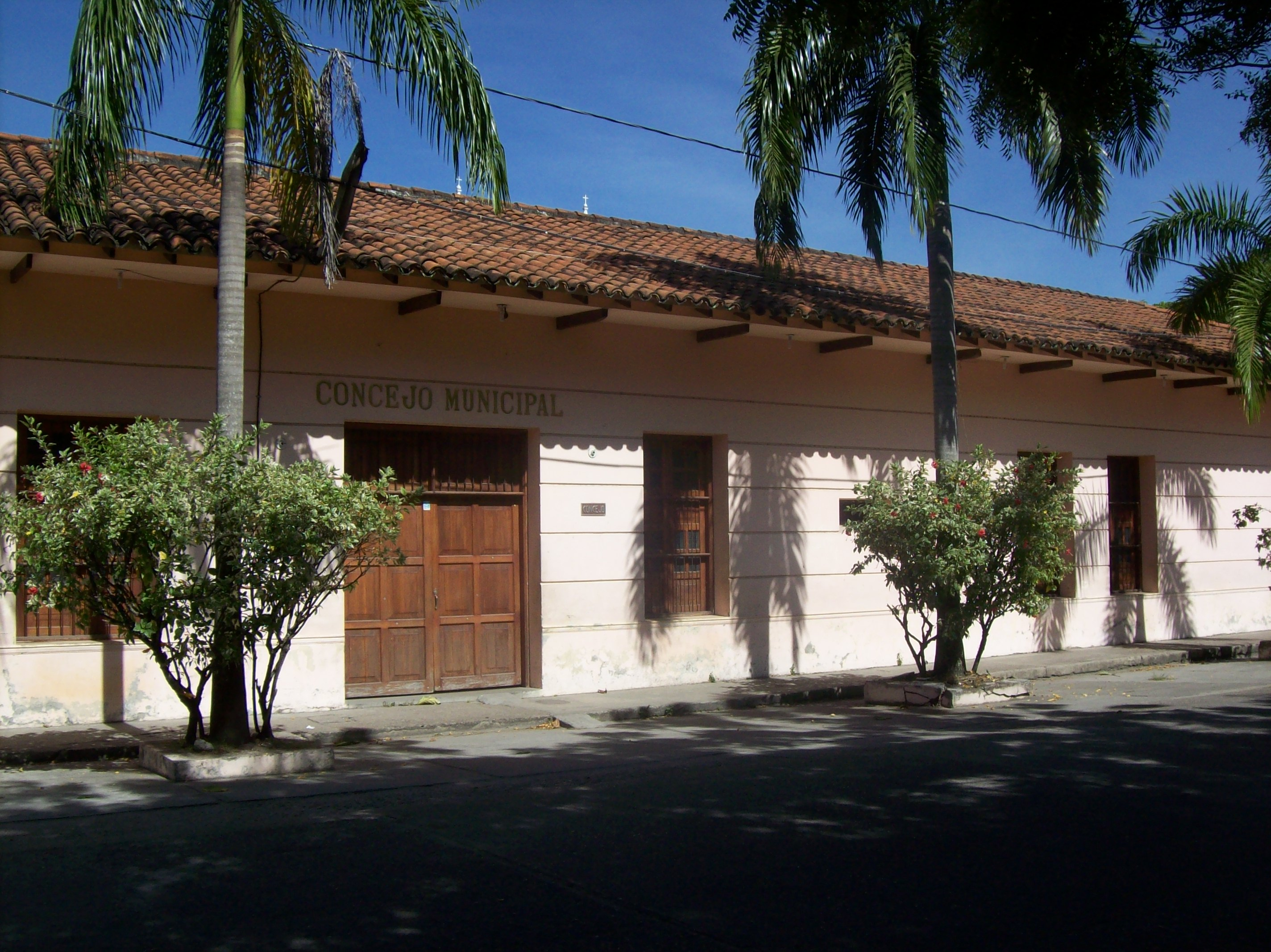
Municipal Council Hall.

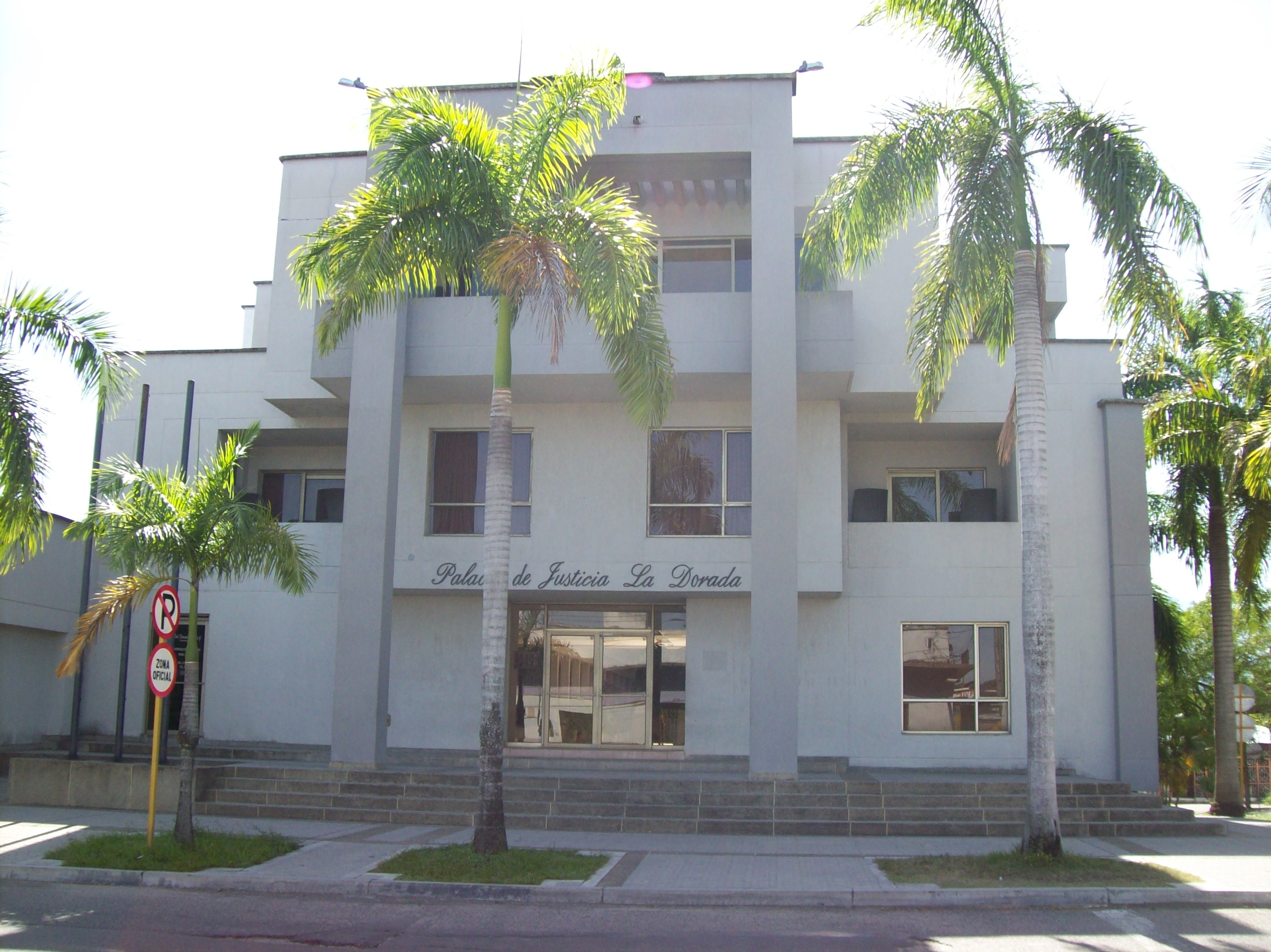
Municipal Palace of Justice.
