= Foreign relations of the Central African Republic =

The Central African Republic (CAR) has diplomatic relations with 119 out of the 193 United Nations member states.

The country's attempts at an open policy towards neighbouring countries have been strained due to the long-standing civil war as well as broader regional conflicts such as reoccurring tensions between Chad and Sudan. In the 2010s, France maintained a military presence in the country. This was largely halted in 2016. The last French troops left in 2022 after relations with France soured due to the country's increasing ties to Russia under Faustin-Archange Touadéra. Since 2018, the Wagner Group, a Russian private military company, has carried out operations in the CAR.

== Participation in international organisations ==
The Central African Republic is an active member in several Central African organizations, including the Economic and Monetary Community of Central Africa (CEMAC), the Economic Community of Central African States (ECCAS), the Bank of Central African States (BEAC) and the African Development Bank (AfDB). It is also a member of the World Trade Organization (WTO). Standardization of tax, customs, and security arrangements between the Central African states is a major foreign policy objective of the CAR government. The CAR is a participant in the Community of Sahel–Saharan States (CEN-SAD), and the African Union (AU). Additionally, it is a member of the Francophonie and an observer state of the Organisation of Islamic Cooperation (OIC).

Other multilateral organizations—including the World Bank, International Monetary Fund, United Nations agencies, European Union, and the African Development Bank—and bilateral donors—including the Republic of Korea, Germany, Japan, the European Union, and the United States—are significant development partners for the CAR.

== Diplomatic relations ==
List of countries which the Central African Republic maintains diplomatic relations with:

#	Country	Date
1	United States	13 August 1960
2	Japan	13 August 1960
3	France	14 August 1960
4	Germany	1 December 1960
5	Russia	7 December 1960
6	United Kingdom	9 December 1960
7	Cameroon	1960
8	Israel	10 November 1961
9	Canada	13 June 1962
10	Republic of the Congo	26 November 1962
11	Sudan	1962
12	Luxembourg	12 June 1963
13	Belgium	13 June 1963
14	South Korea	5 September 1963
15	Switzerland	11 February 1964
16	Chad	29 February 1964
17	Gabon	26 March 1964
18	Serbia	21 May 1964
19	Italy	June 1964
20	China	29 September 1964
21	Spain	27 November 1964
22	Nigeria	25 February 1965
23	Greece	10 September 1965
24	Netherlands	10 December 1965
25	Democratic Republic of the Congo	February 1966
26	Lebanon	1966
—	Holy See	13 May 1967
27	Ghana	14 June 1967
28	Romania	6 February 1968
29	Mali	1968
30	Egypt	2 July 1969
31	North Korea	5 September 1969
32	Bulgaria	9 January 1970
33	Poland	15 January 1970
34	Hungary	10 February 1970
35	Liberia	5 May 1970
36	Norway	16 May 1970
37	Czech Republic	18 May 1970
38	Finland	22 May 1970
39	Albania	23 May 1970
40	Mongolia	18 June 1970
41	Ethiopia	15 September 1970
42	Algeria	9 October 1970
43	Austria	1970
44	Tunisia	19 January 1971
45	Ivory Coast	10 March 1971
46	Libya	6 May 1971
47	Iraq	January 1972
48	Senegal	September 1972
49	Pakistan	2 April 1974
50	Equatorial Guinea	24 January 1975
51	Iran	18 March 1975
52	Philippines	1 June 1976
53	India	7 June 1976
54	Morocco	1976
55	Portugal	15 February 1977
56	Uganda	13 June 1977
57	Turkey	29 January 1980
58	Niger	9 May 1981
—	Sovereign Military Order of Malta	1981
59	Sweden	1983
60	Qatar	1 August 1985
61	Argentina	15 July 1986
62	Thailand	30 October 1987
63	Angola	22 March 1988
64	Colombia	3 October 1988
65	Uruguay	14 March 1989
66	South Africa	23 August 1993
67	Ukraine	14 September 1995
68	Cuba	3 March 2000
69	Malaysia	2000
70	North Macedonia	20 October 2002
71	Venezuela	20 September 2006
72	Kuwait	9 April 2007
73	Vietnam	10 November 2008
74	United Arab Emirates	22 May 2009
75	Australia	18 January 2010
76	Brazil	27 April 2010
77	Georgia	20 December 2010
78	Belarus	4 April 2012
79	Latvia	30 May 2012
80	South Sudan	21 November 2012
81	Fiji	22 January 2013
82	Mauritania	8 October 2013
83	Estonia	3 April 2014
84	Ecuador	20 February 2015
85	Montenegro	2 April 2015
86	Mozambique	18 February 2016
87	Chile	1 March 2016
88	Rwanda	8 July 2016
89	Namibia	21 July 2016
90	Indonesia	21 September 2016
91	New Zealand	27 October 2016
92	Kyrgyzstan	21 November 2016
93	Slovenia	13 February 2017
94	Mauritius	24 March 2017
95	Seychelles	16 May 2017
96	Saudi Arabia	16 June 2017
97	Zambia	28 August 2017
98	Armenia	21 September 2017
99	Tajikistan	15 February 2018
100	Zimbabwe	12 April 2018
101	Ireland	26 June 2018
102	Lithuania	25 September 2018
103	Maldives	24 May 2019
104	Nicaragua	12 June 2019
105	Tanzania	8 November 2019
106	Kenya	28 November 2019
107	Mexico	4 February 2020
108	Botswana	18 October 2021
109	Bahrain	24 March 2022
110	Croatia	18 September 2023
111	Guinea	15 March 2025
112	Burundi	17 March 2025
113	Denmark	18 March 2025
114	Djibouti	18 March 2025
115	Slovakia	25 November 2025
116	Andorra	21 September 2026
117	Cyprus	21 September 2026
118	Kazakhstan	22 September 2026
119	Azerbaijan	23 September 2026

== Bilateral relations ==
Sixteen countries have resident diplomatic representatives in Bangui, and the CAR maintains approximately nineteen missions abroad. The countries the CAR maintains bilateral relations with include the following:

Country	Formal relations began	Notes
Cameroon	1960	Cameroon is the most important regional trade partner of the CAR, its exports to the CAR having increased massively over the course of recent years. In 2022, imports from Cameroon accounted for $243 million to $250,56 million. 80% of the CAR's imports arrive through the port of Douala, before being transported along a 1,450 km road to Bangui which includes unpaved stretches. The war has created a massive influx of refugees into Cameroon; as of 2024, the country held 282,000 Central African refugees. The two countries suffer from border-related issues including violent rebel raids for supplies as well as competing claims to some villages and towns. In 2022, Cameroon and the CAR held three-day talks in Yaoundé, where they agreed to demarcate the border and intensify their joint military presence in border towns.
Chad	29 February 1964	Both countries established diplomatic relations on 29 February 1964 when has been accredited first Permanent Representative (Ambassador) of Chad to Central African Republic Mr. Thomas Keiro. Chad is one of President François Bozizé's closest allies. Before seizing power in 2003, Bozizé's rebel group was equipped and trained in Chad. The group that finally overthrew President Ange-Félix Patassé consisted of–in addition to Bozizé's own rebels–100 soldiers from the Chad National Army. In addition to the 121 Chadian soldiers in the Multinational Force in the Central African Republic (FOMUC), there are still 150 soldiers from Chad in the CAR. The majority is found within the president's lifeguard, while others patrol Bangui and the north-west parts of the country. Chad's president Idriss Déby has an interest in tranquility in north-western CAR, due to the proximity to the location of the Chad-Cameroon Petroleum Development and Pipeline Project. In April 2006, the Chadian rebel group United Front for Democratic Change, which is based in Darfur used C.A.R. as a transit route to Chad, when attacking N'Djamena. Bozizé, who has received much support from President Déby, immediately decided to close the CAR-Sudan border (a decision which he has no capacity at all to enforce). The border was officially closed between April and December. Already a couple of weeks later, an Antonov cargo plane crossed the border from Sudan and landed at Tiringoulou airport in C.A.R., where it unloaded weapons and about 50 armed men who spread out in the area. In the end of June, Central African military and FOMUC peacekeepers clashed with these men near Gordil, resulting in at least 30 casualties. Chad had also maintained good relations with the previous president, Patassé. They were one of the countries that sent troops to defend Patassé during the mutinies in 1996-1997 and assisted in negotiating the subsequent Bangui Agreements. Following the increase of violence in north-western C.A.R. in late 2005, there were at the end of 2006 about 50,000 refugees from C.A.R. in Chad.
China	29 September 1964	Main article: Central African Republic–China relations Both countries established diplomatic relations on 29 September 1964 under the government of David Dacko, which thereby cut off relations with Taiwan. It is believed that France tacitly supported the 1966 coup by Jean-Bédel Bokassa because of Dacko's rapprochement to China. Under Bokassa, the Central African regime immediately cut off its diplomatic relations with China in January 1966 and resumed its diplomatic relations with Taiwan in May 1968. However, on 20 August 1976, Bokassa switched back to the People's Republic with a state visit to Beijing and the signing of a joint communiqué. The Central African government once again switched it alliance to Taiwan on 8 July 1991 (under Kolingba) and finally back to China with a joint communiqué signed on 29 January 1998 (under Patassé). Relations between China and the CAR notably include Chinese gold mining exploits in the country. These activities have repeatedly seen violent backlash from rebel groups. Two Chinese nationals were killed in Sosso-Nakombo in 2020, nine Chinese workers died in the 2023 Chimbolo massacre, and four workers died in a 2024 rebel attack on the gold mining town of Gaga. China has also provided financial and technical aid to major construction projects, including a stadium in Bangui (finished in 2007), a solar power plant near Bangui intended to deal with the widespread power cuts in the CAR (finished in 2023), and a highway from Bossarangba to Mbaïki (started in 2023). The CAR was among 53 countries backing the Hong Kong national security law at the UN in June 2020.
Democratic Republic of the Congo		Main article: Central African Republic–Democratic Republic of the Congo relations Bozizé has surprisingly good relations both with the Democratic Republic of the Congo (DRC) President Joseph Kabila and the former rebel leader Jean-Pierre Bemba. When the old president Kolingba tried to overthrow Patassé in May 2001, the Movement for the Liberation of Congo (MLC) came to his rescue. MLC controlled the northern part of DRC and its rebels were stationed on the other side of the Ubangi river from Bangui. The MLC executed between 60 and 120 persons, mainly from the Yakoma tribe and committed atrocities–including killing, looting and rape–against the population. This terror and the crimes carried out during MLC's war against Bozizé's rebels between October 2002 and March 2003 is now being investigated by the International Criminal Court, which says it has identified 600 rape victims and the real numbers are expected to be higher. Most of the crimes were committed by Congolese MLC soldiers, but Bozizé's rebels, including elements from Chad, were also responsible. During Bozizé's time in power, new clashes have taken place between his soldiers and the MLC. Bozizé has strengthened military presence along the border and deployed an amphibious force patrolling the Ubangi river. There were refugees from DRC in C.A.R. from July 1999 (when Kabila advanced in the region bordering C.A.R.). The refugees were repatriated following an agreement between UNHCR and the governments of the two countries in 2004. Refugees from C.A.R. in DRC were beginning to be repatriated in July 2004. Currently, several hundred troops of the Military of the Democratic Republic of the Congo are stationed in CAR.
France	14 August 1960	Main article: Central African Republic–France relations Both countries established diplomatic relations on 14 August 1960 The CAR was a French colony under the name Ubangi-Shari between 1903 and 1960. Throughout the Cold War and afterwards, the country retained political and economic ties with France as well as a French military presence. As of 2022, imports from France accounted for $50,308 million, a significant decrease from €109,426 million in 2017. The Cold War involvement of France in Central African politics included propping up David Dacko to be the first president, tacitly supporting the 1965 coup by Jean-Bédel Bokassa and providing substantial support to his lavish coronation ceremony in 1977, overthrowing Bokassa and re-installing Dacko in Operation Caban, and supporting André Kolingba in his coup against Dacko two years later. The French military advisor Jean-Claude Mantion, serving as head of the Presidential Guard under Dacko and Kolingba, was described as a "proconsul" and as "the president of President Kolingba", implying he was even more powerful than Kolingba himself. France closed its military bases in Bangui and Bouar in 1997 and relations with the CAR decreased during the Patassé era. After the 2003 coup that brought François Bozizé to power, France again sent 300 troops to Bangui, initially to repatriate foreigners, but keeping them in place after a request from Bozizé. The military ties with France were further restored by sending the Foreign Legion general Jean-Pierre Pérez - who was also connected to the private military company EHC - to be Bozizé's counseller. Between 2013 and 2016, France carried out a military intervention codenamed Operation Sangaris against Séléka and Anti-balaka rebel militias. However, in the early stages of the intervention, France was also accused of cooperating with the Anti-balaka against Séléka, which helped cement Séléka's popularity among groups that suffered from Anti-balaka attacks and massacres. France officially ended Sangaris in 2016 and the last French troops left in 2022, after bilateral relations significantly cooled due to the CAR's increasing ties to Russia under Faustin-Archange Touadéra.: Central African Republic has an embassy in Paris.; France has an embassy in Bangui.
Ghana	14 June 1967	Both countries established diplomatic relations on 14 June 1967. Ghana is represented in the Central African Republic through its embassy in the Democratic Republic of the Congo.
India	7 June 1976	Main article: Central African Republic–India relations Both countries established diplomatic relations on 7 June 1976. India maintains an Honorary Consulate General in Bangui. The two countries signed a protocol to hold recurring "Foreign Office Consultations" in 2010, although only one such consultation was held (in 2011), and have maintained contacts in the context of economic cooperation.
Israel	10 November 1961	Both countries established diplomatic relations on 10 November 1961 when government of the CAR agreed to the appointment of Ephraim Ben-Haim as Israel's first Ambassador to Central African Republic. But CAR severed diplomatic relations with Israel on 21 October 1973. Diplomatic relations were restored on 16 January 1989. The CAR also recognizes the State of Palestine. In the United Nations General Assembly, its position has varied over time. In the Bokassa era, as the country remained a Western and especially French ally, it was among 35 countries voting against the 1975 resolution determining that Zionism is a form of racism. However, it has taken a more favorable stance towards Palestine in recent years, voting in favour of the 2023 resolution calling for a ceasefire in the Gaza war and the 2024 resolution upgrading Palestine's rights in the UN.
Libya	6 May 1971	Both countries established diplomatic relations on 6 May 1971 Libya still plays an important role in the domestic politics of C.A.R.. Libya assisted C.A.R. in negotiating a peace agreement was signed in Tripoli in February 2007, between President Bozizé and the head of the Front démocratique du people centrafricain (FDPC) rebel movement (who is also said to have close ties to Union of Democratic Forces for Unity (UFDR), the rebel group that seized several cities in northern C.A.R. in November 2006). Libya was previously one of the former president Patassé's closest allies, providing him with strong military support when he no longer trusted his own military or France. Patassé granted Libyan enterprises outstanding economic advantages, such as a 99-year concession on diamonds, gold, oil and uranium all over the country. It is not known whether these agreements are still valid, but Bozizé has anyway a continuously good relation with Libya.
Mexico	4 February 2020	Both nations established diplomatic relations on 4 February 2020 in New York City, with the signing by their respective ambassadors to the United Nations.: Mexico is accredited to the Central African Republic from its Permanent Mission to the United Nations in New York City.
North Korea	5 September 1969	Main article: Central African Republic–North Korea relations Both nations established diplomatic relations on 5 September 1969 While insignificant in recent years, there existed some contacts between the two countries during the Cold War, including state visits by both Bokassa and Kolingba to Pyongyang.
Pakistan	2 April 1974	Both countries established diplomatic relations on 2 April 1974 when Pakistan's first ambassador to the Central African Republic, Mr. Sha Ansani, presented credentials to President Jean Bedel Bokassa. The Central African Republic has maintained friendly relations with Pakistan, although these are not very intense. Pakistani Prime Minister Nawaz Sharif paid a state visit to Bangui in 1997. Pakistan is the third largest military contributor to the UN mission MINUSCA, only surpassed by Rwanda and Bangladesh. It is also the third largest recipient of Central African exports (behind the United Arab Emirates and Italy), receiving $23.1 million as of 2022.
Russia	7 December 1960	Main article: Central African Republic–Russia relations See also: Wagner Group activities in the Central African Republic The CAR and the Soviet Union established diplomatic relations on 7 December 1960 In March 2018, Russia agreed to provide free military aid to the Central African Republic, sending small arms, ammunition, and 175 instructors to train the Central African Armed Forces. The advisers are believed to be members of the Wagner Group. It was Russia's largest military deployment to Africa since the end of the Cold War and the collapse of the Soviet Union. As of January 2019, the CAR is considering hosting a Russian Armed Forces base. A former Russian intelligence official has been installed by the Central African president as his top security adviser.
Serbia	21 May 1964	The CAR and Yugoslavia established diplomatic relations on 21 May 1964 In 2011, the CAR recognized the independence of Kosovo. However, it again withdrew this recognition in 2019, making it the fourteenth country to do so. Serbian prime minister Ivica Dačić visited the CAR in 2018 and Faustin-Archange Touadéra visited Serbia in 2024.
Spain	27 November 1964	Both countries established diplomatic relations on 27 November 1964: Central African Republic is accredited to Spain from its embassy in Paris, France.; Spain is accredited to the Central African Republic from its embassy in Yaoundé, Cameroon.
Sudan	1962	Main article: Central African Republic–Sudan relations Both countries established diplomatic relations in 1962 Given that Bozizé accuses Sudan of supporting the UFDR rebels who are actively fighting the Central African Government, the relation between the two countries has remained good. Bozizé even planned to visit Khartoum in December 2006, but had to cancel his trip when Chad (which has strained relations with the Sudanese Government) threatened to withdraw its military support to C.A.R. Bozizé said that he was afraid of getting involved in the Darfur crisis and claimed that the solution is in the hands of Sudanese president Omar al-Bashir. During the Second Sudanese Civil War (1983–2005), there was a massive uncontrolled crossing of the Sudan-C.A.R. border by soldiers from the Sudan People's Liberation Army (SPLA), looking for safety during periods of attacks or drought. At the same time, C.A.R. was used by the Sudanese Armed Forces when launching attacks on the SPLA. Moreover, thousands of Sudanese refugees lived in C.A.R.; at the peak of the influx, by the early 1990s there were 36,000 Sudanese refugees in Mboki in south-east C.A.R. About half of the refugees were SPLA soldiers with more than 5000 weapons, who allegedly occupied towns as far as 200 km into the C.A.R. The United Nations High Commissioner for Refugees was forced to close its refugee camp at Mboki in October 2002, due to the high prevalence of weapons. After the war, all refugees were repatriated to Sudan; the last of the 9,700 remaining in Central African Republic were evacuated in April 2007. Sudan was one of the contributors to the peacekeeping force of the Community of Sahel–Saharan States (CEN-SAD) in Central African Republic in 2001–2002.
Turkey	29 January 1980	Main article: Central African Republic–Turkey relations Both countries established diplomatic relations on 29 January 1980 The trade volume between the two countries was US$5.81 million in 2019 (the CAR's exports/imports: 1.97/3.84 million USD). As of 2022, the CAR's exports to Turkey had risen to $5.23 million, most of which consisted of rough wood. After a 2022 visit of Foreign Minister Sylvie Baïpo-Temon to Turkey, the two countries signed agreements on political and economic cooperation.: Central African Republic has an Honorary Consulate in Istanbul.; The Turkish ambassador in Yaoundé to Cameroon is also accredited to the Central African Republic.
United Arab Emirates	22 May 2009	Both countries established diplomatic relations on 22 May 2009 The UAE are by far the largest recipient of Central African exports, with estimates for 2022 ranging from $47.3 to $91.9 million. More than two thirds of these exports consist of gold while the remnant is almost entirely composed of diamonds. These exports increased over tenfold between 2017 and 2022. In November 2024, at a plenary meeting in Dubai, the Kimberley Process lifted the ban on rough diamonds from the CAR it had imposed after the 2013 Séléka takeover. Lifting this embargo on potential "blood diamonds" had been put on the table by Russia when it chaired the Kimberley Process in 2020–2021, but pressure to lift it especially intensified under UAE chairmanship. When the embargo was still active, organizations including Amnesty International found that traders in Dubai and Antwerp (two major hubs of the diamond trade) used loopholes to continue trading illegally acquired diamonds from the CAR. Sheikh Mohammed bin Rashid Al Maktoum met with Faustin-Archange Touadéra to discuss bilateral relations on multiple occasions, including in Abu Dhabi in 2021, Dubai in 2023 and Bangui in 2024. In January 2024, the two countries also agreed to build a new airport in Bangui with $200 million in Emirati funding.
United Kingdom	1960	The UK established diplomatic relations with the Central African Republic on 9 December 1960.: The Central African Republic does not maintain an embassy in the UK.; The United Kingdom is not accredited to the Central African Republic through an embassy; the UK develops relations through its embassy in Kinshasa, DR Congo.
United States	13 August 1960	Main article: Central African Republic–United States relations Both countries established diplomatic relations on 13 August 1960 The U.S. Embassy in Bangui was briefly closed as a result of the 1996–97 mutinies. It reopened in 1998 with limited staff, but U.S. Agency for International Development (USAID) and Peace Corps missions previously operating in Bangui did not return. The American Embassy in Bangui again temporarily suspended operations on November 2, 2002, in response to security concerns raised by the October 2002 launch of François Bozizé's 2003 military coup. The Embassy reopened in January 2005; however, there currently is limited U.S. diplomatic/consular representation in the CAR. As a result, the ability of the Embassy to provide services to American citizens remains extremely limited. The United States Department of State approved the lifting of Section 508 aid restrictions triggered by the coup; U.S. assistance to the Central African Republic had been prohibited except in the areas of humanitarian aid and support for democratization.: Central African Republic has an embassy in Washington, D.C.; United States has an embassy in Bangui.

== See also ==
- List of diplomatic missions in the Central African Republic
- List of diplomatic missions of the Central African Republic
