= Visa policy of the Central African Republic =

Policy on permits required to enter the Central African Republic

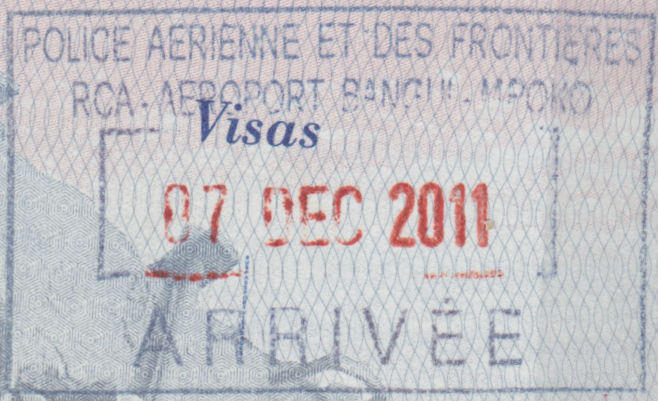
Entry stamp

Visitors to the Central African Republic must obtain a visa from one of the Central African Republic diplomatic missions or French diplomatic missions unless they come from one of the visa exempt countries.

== Visa policy map ==
Visa policy of the Central African Republic The Central African Republic Visa not required - may enter with an ID card (90 days) Visa not required (90 days) Visa on arrival Visa required

== Visa exemption ==
Citizens of the following 14 countries can visit Central African Republic without a visa for up to the duration listed below:

90 days

- Benin
- Burkina Faso
- Burundi
- Cameroon^{ID}
- Chad^{ID}
- Republic of the Congo^{ID}
- Côte d'Ivoire
- Equatorial Guinea^{ID}
- Gabon^{ID}
- Israel
- Liberia
- Niger
- Rwanda
- Senegal

_{ID - May enter with a valid ID card.}

Date of visa changes
- 1 April 2015: United States
- 12 October 2017: CEMAC (Economic and Monetary Community of Central Africa) states: Equatorial Guinea and Gabon
- 12–13 October 2017: CEMAC states: Cameroon, Chad, Republic of the Congo
- 8 October 2019: United Arab Emirates

Cancelled:

- 17 November 2023: United States

== Visa on arrival ==
According to the UAE Ministry of Foreign Affairs website, citizens of United Arab Emirates may obtain a visa on arrival for a maximum stay of 90 days.

== E-Visa ==
Electronic visa application portal exists and allows to submit an application, however it's operating in a "test mode" and claims that "electronic visa processing is currently not possible." Embassy of the Central African Republic in Paris also allows filling out the regular visa application online.

== Transit ==
Passengers with a confirmed onward ticket for a flight on the same aircraft to a third country. They must stay in the aircraft or in the international transit area of the airport and have documents required for the next destination.

== See also ==
- Visa requirements for Central African Republic citizens
- Central African Republic passport
