= Central African Republic–Germany relations =

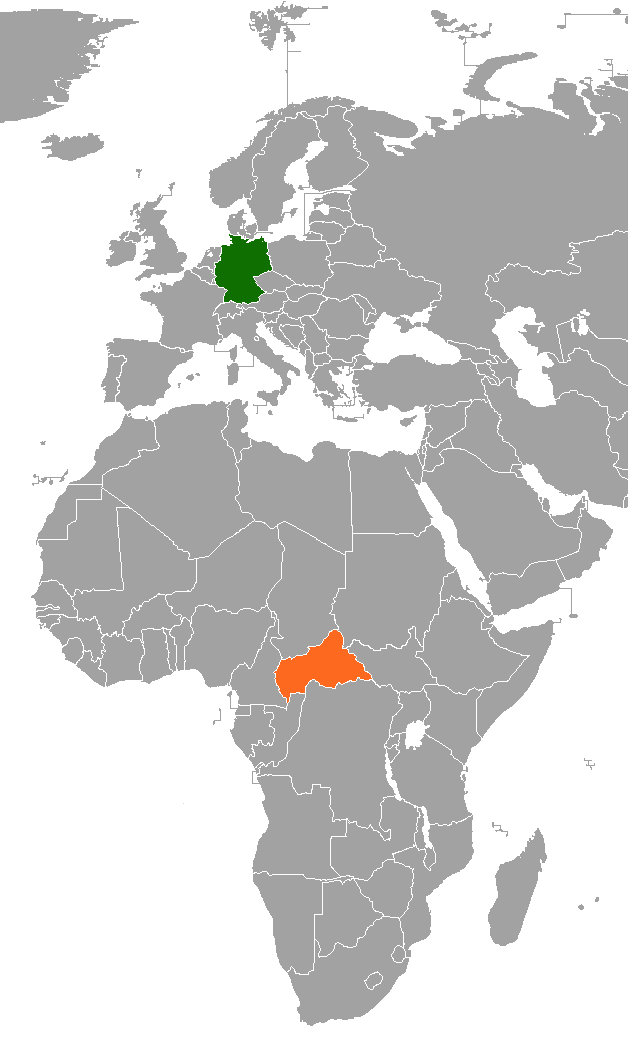

- Germany: Central African Republic

Central African Republic–Germany relations are the bilateral relations between the Central African Republic (CAR) and Germany. The relations between both countries are described by the Federal Foreign Office as "problem-free, but of low intensity". Since the closure of the German Embassy in Bangui, the German Embassy in Cameroon has been responsible for relations with the Central African Republic. The Central African Republic is one of the few countries that does not have its own embassy in Germany. The Central African Embassy in Paris is responsible for relations with Germany.

== History ==
The baltic German African explorer Georg Schweinfurth discovered the Uelle River in 1870 and explored areas located in what is now the Central African Republic. In 1911, the Morocco-Congo Treaty annexed the Mbaïki region to the Kamerun colony, and parts of the modern territory were thus under German colonial administration for a time.

In 1960, West Germany under Chancellor Konrad Adenauer and the Central African Republic, which had become independent of France two years earlier, established diplomatic relations under President David Dacko. The following year, Heinrich Sartorius took up his post as the first ambassador. On December 18, 1972, the Central African Republic also established relations with the German Democratic Republic (GDR) after the Hallstein Doctrine was abandoned by West Germany.

In 1977, Jean-Bédel Bokassa has himself crowned Emperor of Central Africa. As a German special ambassador, Harald Graf von Posadowsky-Wehner attends the coronation ceremony. From 1981, the German jurist Rolf Knieper acts as legal advisor to the Emperor of Central Africa.

In 1997, the German embassy in the Central African Republic closed.

In 2014, 80 German soldiers were sent by the Bundestag for the EU mission EUFOR RCA in the Central African Republic.

== Economic relations ==
Economic relations are barely developed. In 2021, the volume of trade between the two countries amounted to 10.7 million euros. German exports amounted to 9.1 million euros, while Germany imported goods worth 1.6 million euros from the Central African Republic.

Germany provides development assistance to the Central African Republic. In 2014, Germany provided 145 million euros for the reconstruction of the health system and measures to combat hunger in the country, which was shaken by civil war.

== See also ==
- Foreign relations of the Central African Republic
- Foreign relations of Germany
