= List of diplomatic missions of the Central African Republic =

This is a list of diplomatic missions of the Central African Republic, excluding honorary consulates.

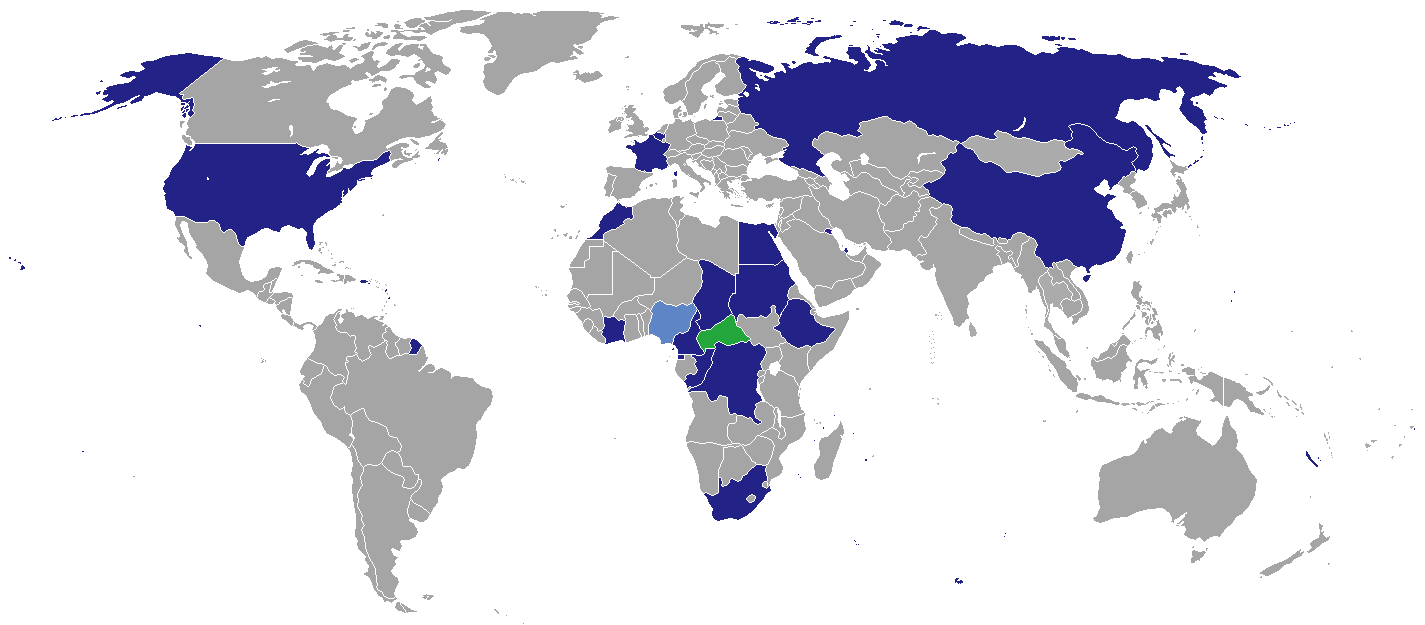
Diplomatic missions of the Central African Republic

== Current missions ==
=== Africa ===
Host country	Host city	Mission	Concurrent accreditation	Ref.
Cameroon	Yaoundé	Embassy		
Cameroon	Douala	Consulate		
Chad	N'Djamena	Embassy		
Congo-Brazzaville	Brazzaville	Embassy		
Congo-Kinshasa	Kinshasa	Embassy		
Egypt	Cairo	Embassy	Countries: Iran; Iraq; Israel; Jordan; Lebanon; Syria	
Equatorial Guinea	Malabo	Embassy		
Ethiopia	Addis Ababa	Embassy	Countries: Djibouti; Mauritius; Seychelles; Somalia; International Organizations: African Union	
Gabon	Libreville	Embassy		
Ivory Coast	Abidjan	Embassy	Countries: Burkina Faso; Ghana; Liberia; Sierra Leone	
Morocco	Rabat	Embassy	Countries: Algeria; Mauritania; Tunisia	
Morocco	Laayoune	Consulate-General		
Nigeria	Abuja	Consulate		
South Africa	Pretoria	Embassy	Countries: Botswana; Comoros; Eswatini; Lesotho; Madagascar; Malawi; Mozambique; Namibia; New Zealand; Zimbabwe	
Sudan	Khartoum	Embassy	Countries: Eritrea	

=== Americas ===
Host country	Host city	Mission	Concurrent accreditation	Ref.
United States	Washington, D.C.	Embassy	Countries: Brazil; Canada; Mexico	

=== Asia ===
Host country	Host city	Mission	Concurrent accreditation	Ref.
China	Beijing	Embassy	Countries: Afghanistan; Bhutan; Mongolia; Myanmar; North Korea; Pakistan	
Kuwait	Kuwait City	Embassy		
Qatar	Doha	Embassy		

=== Europe ===
Host country	Host city	Mission	Concurrent accreditation	Ref.
Belgium	Brussels	Embassy	Countries: Luxembourg; Netherlands; International Organization: European Union; Organisation of African, Caribbean and Pacific States	
France	Paris	Embassy	Countries: Armenia; Austria; Georgia; Germany; Ireland; Italy; Greece; Portugal; Spain; Ukraine; United Kingdom; International Organization: Food and Agriculture Organization; International Fund for Agricultural Development; Organisation internationale de la Francophonie; UNESCO; Sovereign Entity: Sovereign Military Order of Malta	
Russia	Moscow	Embassy	Countries: Azerbaijan; Belarus; Kazakhstan; Kyrgyzstan; Tajikistan; Uzbekistan	

=== Multilateral organizations ===
Organization	Host city	Host country	Mission	Concurrent accreditation	Ref.
United Nations	Geneva	Switzerland	Permanent Mission	Countries: Liechtenstein; Switzerland	
United Nations	New York City	United States	Permanent Mission		

== Gallery ==
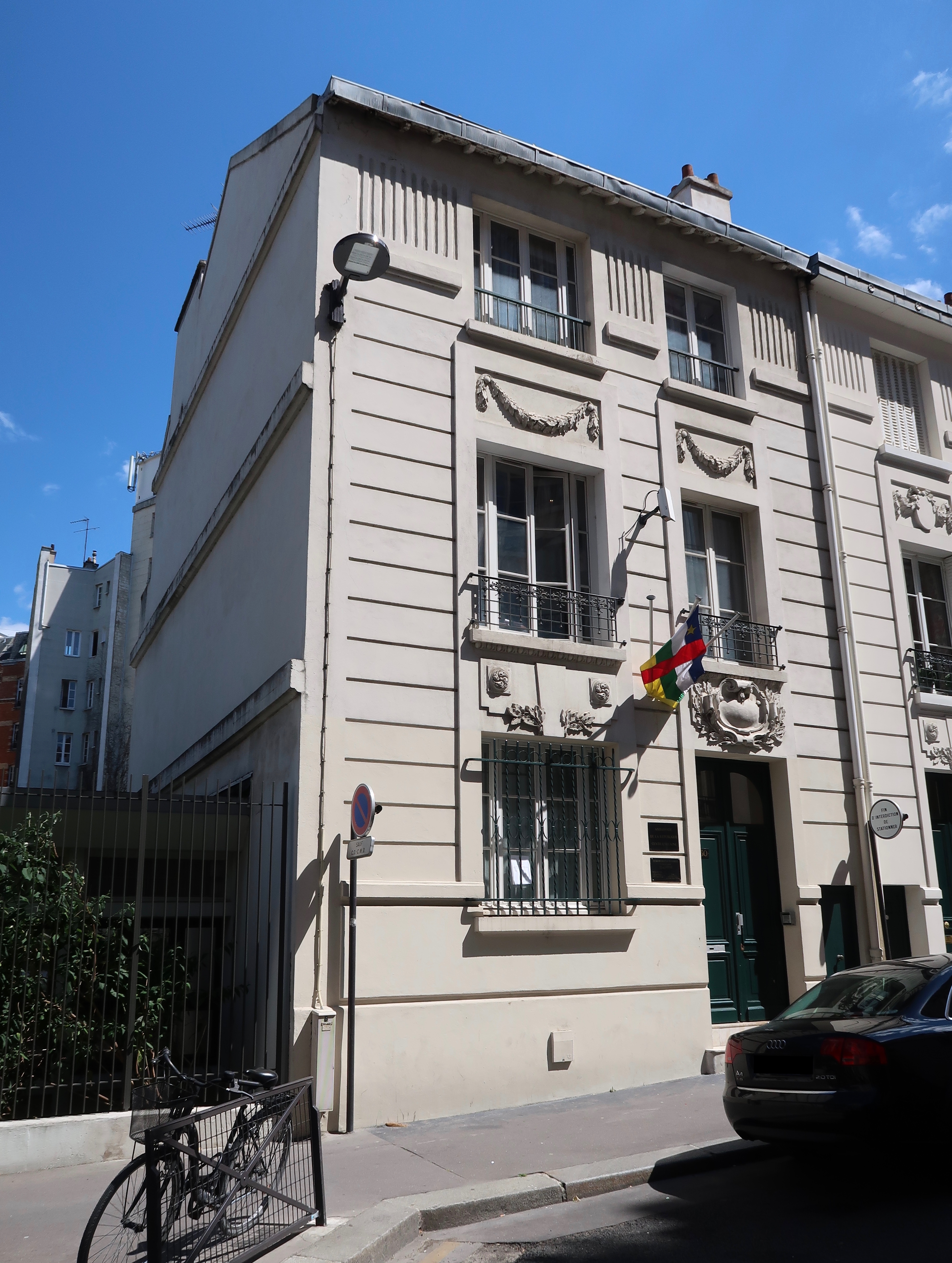
Embassy in Paris

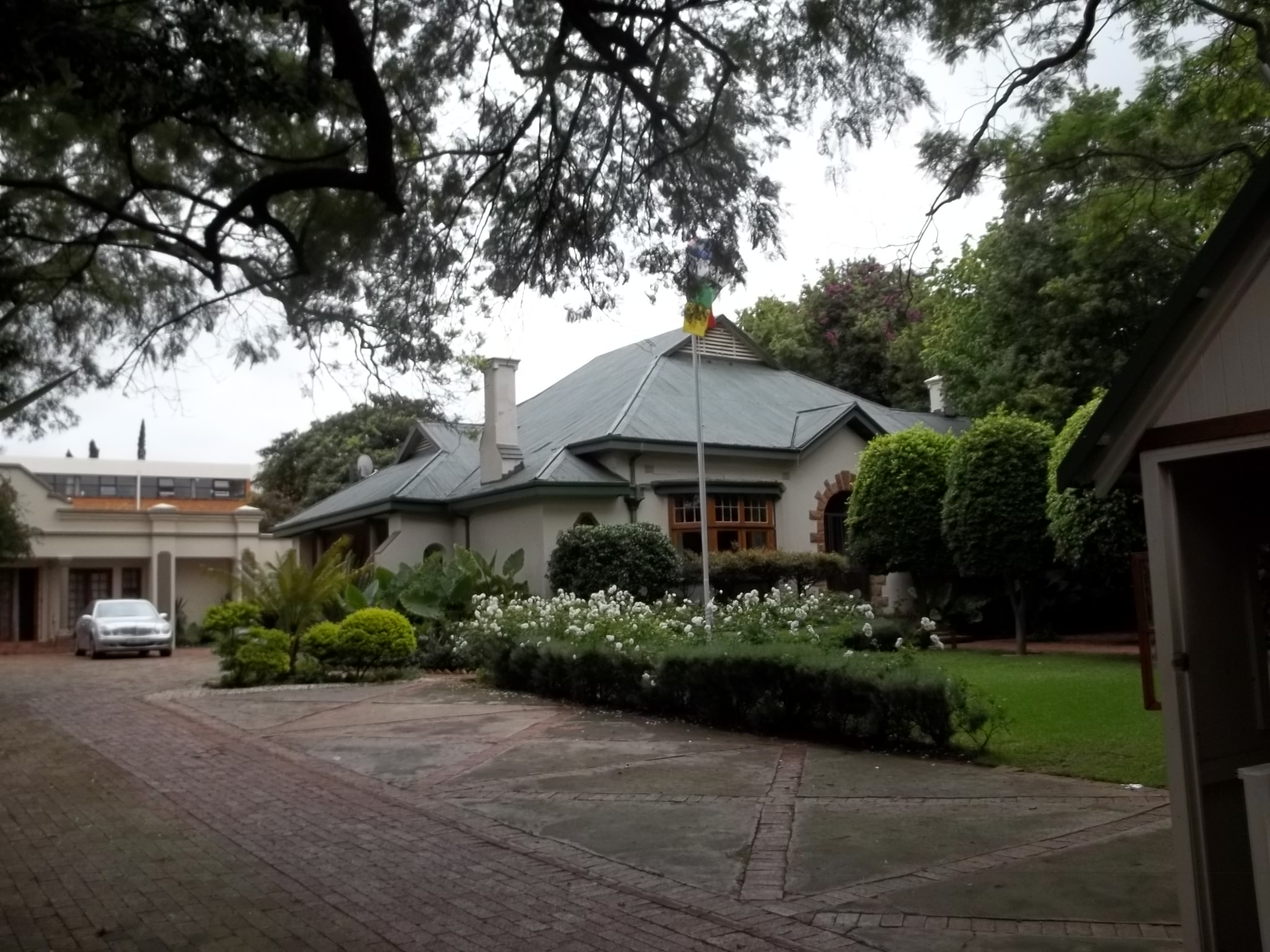
Embassy in Pretoria

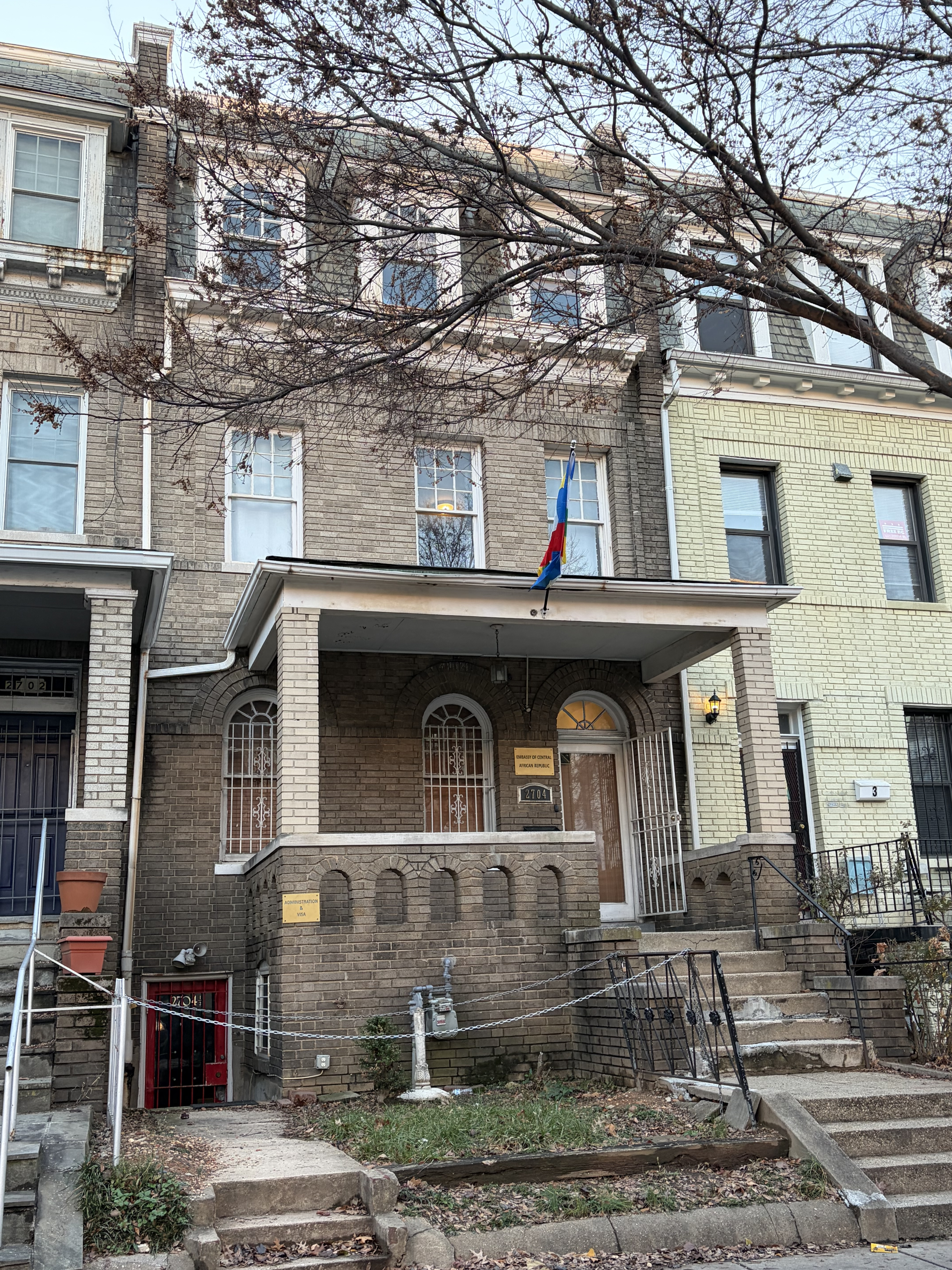
Embassy in Washington, D.C.

== Closed missions ==
=== Europe ===
Host country	Host city	Mission	Year closed	Ref.
Romania	Bucharest	Embassy	Unknown	

== See also ==
- Foreign relations of the Central African Republic
- List of diplomatic missions in the Central African Republic
- Visa policy of the Central African Republic
