= Central African Republic–Democratic Republic of the Congo relations =

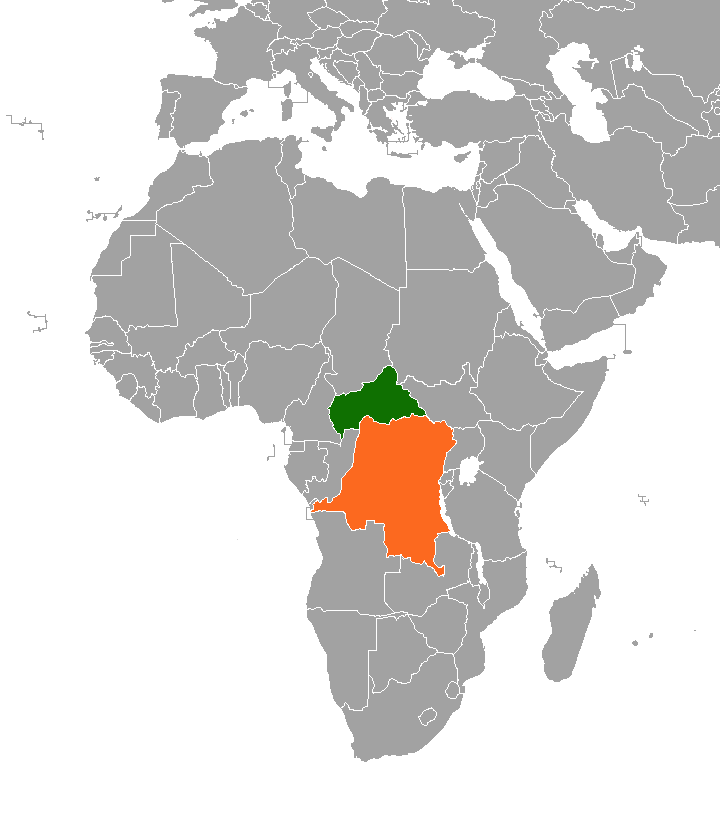
- Central African Republic: DR Congo

Central African Republic–Democratic Republic of the Congo relations refers to the current and historic bilateral relationship between the Central African Republic (CAR) and the Democratic Republic of the Congo (DRC). The two countries are neighbours and share a border 1,747 km long. Due to the military conflicts on both sides of the border, many refugees have crossed into the other's territory. There were about 200,000 Congolese nationals in the Central African Republic as of 2014, and there were around 100,000 Central African refugees in the DRC as of 2016.

The current Congolese ambassador to the Central African Republic is Gaspard Mugaruka, who has been in that office since 2002. Before that the DRC did not have an embassy in CAR for ten years.

== History ==
According to the United Nations High Commissioner for Refugees (UNHCR), about 3,400 refugees from the Central African Republic arrived in the Democratic Republic of the Congo in 2001, most of them settled in the Mole refugee camp.

In 2012, a civil war broke out in the Central African Republic, which also affected neighboring Democratic Republic of the Congo. In 2014, more than 60,000 Central African refugees arrived in the Democratic Republic of the Congo, of whom 29,000 were housed in refugee camps. One third of the refugees in the country were under 18 years old, and with the support of international organizations, they were able to attend schools in the Boyabu and Mole camps.

Between May and December 2017, an additional 39,150 Central African refugees were registered. In 2018, according to several sources, between 172,011 and more than 180,000 Central African refugees were living in the Democratic Republic of the Congo. According to testimonies from some refugees, living conditions in the camps were very difficult, with cases of death due to heat, hunger, and disease. Local rivers were also used as a source of drinking water.

== Military cooperation ==
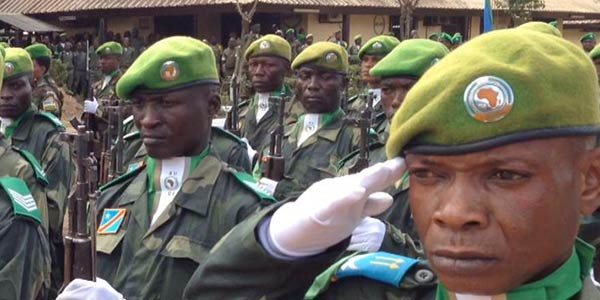
Congolese FARDC peacekeepers in the Central African Republic

The Armed Forces of the Democratic Republic of the Congo (FARDC) has had peacekeepers in the neighbouring country since at least 2003 due to the ongoing political instability and civil war. During the 2003 Central African Republic coup d'état, there were 370 FARDC troops in Bangui as part of CEMAC peacekeeping mission. As of 2014 there were 850 FARDC soldiers and 150 officers of the Congolese National Police as peacekeepers in CAR due to the civil war that started in 2012.

The two governments also cooperated in dealing with the Lord's Resistance Army insurgency.

== See also ==
- Foreign relations of the Central African Republic
- Foreign relations of the Democratic Republic of the Congo
