= Central African Republic–Turkey relations =

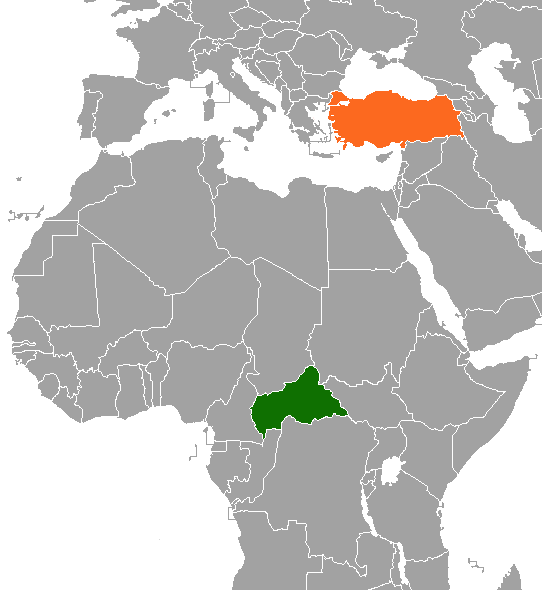
- Central African Republic: Turkey

Central African Republic–Turkey relations are the bilateral relations between the Central African Republic and Turkey.

== History ==
When the 2012 civil war in Central African Republic started, Turkey was among the first nations to provide assistance for the victims of violence, while also paying endeavors for the mobilization of the international community to assist those in need. The Turkish IHH Humanitarian Relief Foundation provided flour, oil, sugar, rice and money to the country.

In 2014, the Turkish news agency Anadolu Agency stated that the Turkish Cooperation and Coordination Agency (TIKA) had donated computers to the Central African government during a visit of the delegation to Turkey while attending a meeting of Organization of Islamic Cooperation (OIC). The Turkish government's contribution to the development of the Central African Republic includes the modernization of hospitals and mosques, as well as and monetary donations. The Turkish Directorate of Religious Affairs and Turkish Red Crescent are reported having contributed as well.

In 2022, after a bilateral visit of the Central African Foreign Minister Sylvie Baïpo-Temon to Turkey, the two countries signed agreements on political consultation, protocol training, cooperation framework, as well as issues in the fields of mining and transportation.

== Diplomatic missions ==
The Turkish ambassador in Yaoundé, Cameroon is also accredited to Central African Republic, while an embassy in Bangui is anticipated to be opened. Since 2003, Turkey has an honorary consul in Bangui. The Central African Republic has an honorary consulate in Istanbul since 1995.

== High-level visits ==
Guest	Host	Place of visit	Date of visit
(Central African Republic) Prime Minister André Nzapayeké	(Turkey) President Abdullah Gül	Ankara and Istanbul, Turkey	23-25 June 2014

== Economic relations ==
In 2018, total trade between Turkey and the Central African Republic was $5.89 million US dollars. This number decreased to $5.81 million US dollars the next year. Turkish export to CAR was $3.84 million US dollars, while export of CAR to Turkey was approximately $1.97 million US dollars. The main products exported from Turkey to CAR are paper, machinery and cleaning materials, while Turkish main imports are timber, fertilizers and minerals.

By 2022, the CAR's exports to Turkey had risen to $5.23 million, most of which consisted of timber.

== Education ==
Turkey is providing scholarships to Central African students since 1992, as part of the Türkiye Scholarships. During a visit of the Central African Foreign Minister Sylvie Baïpo-Temon to Turkey in 2022, she welcomed and expected Maarif Schools in Central African Republic.

== See also ==
- Foreign relations of the Central African Republic
- Foreign relations of Turkey
