= Central African Republic–North Korea relations =

- Central African Republic: North Korea

Central African Republic–North Korea relations refers to the current and historical relationship between the Central African Republic and the North Korea (DPRK). Neither country maintains an embassy in their respective capitals.

== History ==
During the Cold War, the DPRK under Kim Il Sung maintained a close relationship with the long-time military ruler of the Central African Republic, Jean-Bédel Bokassa. While Bokassa was a right-wing anti-communist, this appears to have had no effect on their relationship. Diplomatic relations between the two countries began on 5 September 1969; however, other sources cite the date 28 January 1965. Although the CAR (and Chad, which also established relations with North Korea in 1969) had previously only maintained relations with South Korea, this did not lead to South Korea breaking off relations. This served as an important precedent that "allowed many governments to opt for a non-partisan approach".

In 1976, Bokassa proclaimed himself Emperor Bokassa I, and declared the Central African Empire. The eccentric dictator's first foreign visit after his lavish coronation was to Pyongyang in 1978 (just ahead of a Franco-African Summit in Paris), where he signed a treaty of peace and friendship with Kim.

Friendly relations continued even after Bokassa was overthrown in 1979. As North Korea promoted its identification with the cause of the Non-Aligned Movement, André Kolingba went on state visits to Pyongyang in 1982 and 1983 and a delegation including General Guillaume Lapo visited in 1984. According to Korea Today, Kim Jong Il was awarded the Order of Central African Merit by the CAR in 1983. By March 1986, the DPRK had supplied 13 technicians to the Central African Republic, seemingly to counter South Korean influence in the country.

== See also ==
- Foreign relations of the Central African Republic
- Foreign relations of North Korea
