= Central African Republic–France relations =

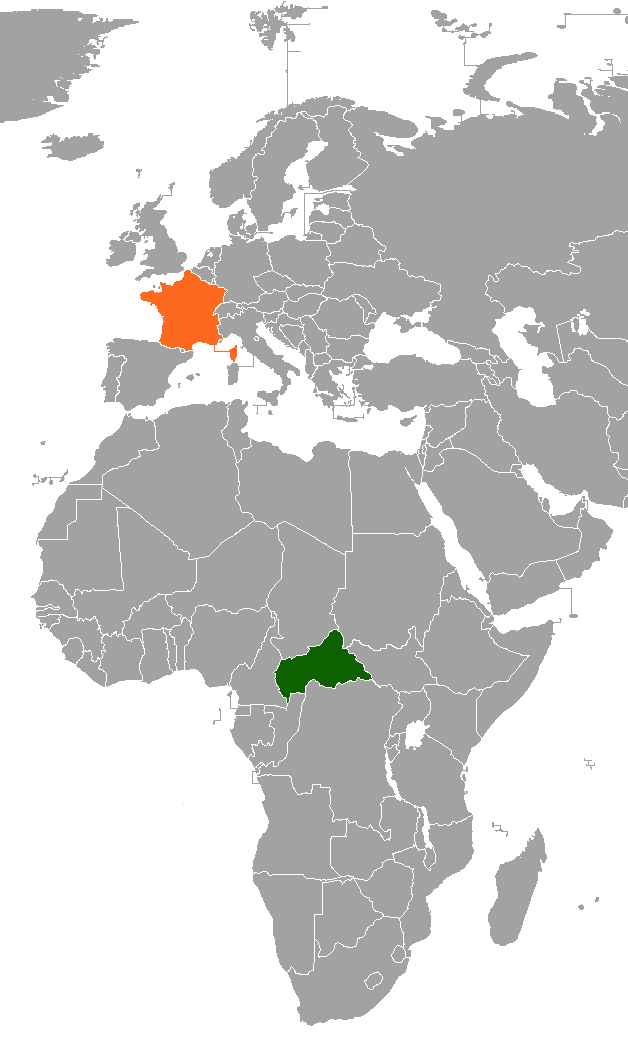
- Central African Republic: France

Central African Republic–France relations are foreign relations between the Central African Republic (CAR) and France. Both nations are members of the Francophonie and the United Nations.

== History ==
=== French Colonialism ===
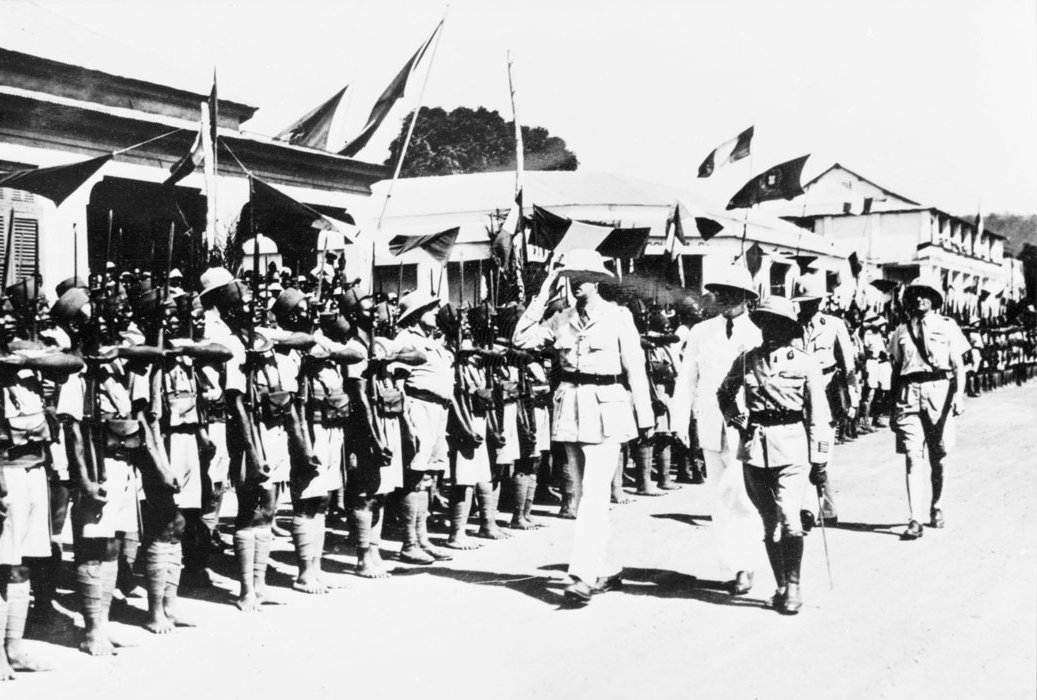
General Charles de Gaulle in Bangui, 1940.

During the Partition of Africa in the 1880s, Belgium, the German Empire and France each competed against each other in order to control territory north of the Ubangi River. In 1903, France named its new colony 'Ubangi-Shari' and in 1910, France incorporated the territory along with four other colonies (French Congo, Gabon, Chad and French Cameroon) into one colonial federation known as French Equatorial Africa. Initially, the French government leased large parts of land for European companies and forced the local population to gather wild rubber, hunt for ivory and animal skins, and work on plantations. Due to forced exploitation by the French colonial empire, Central African locals began to rebel in the early 20th century. This led to the Kongo-Wara rebellion (1928–1931). The rebellion was soon suppressed by the French government.

During World War II, Central African soldiers formed part of the grand French colonial army (Troupes coloniales) and fought for Free France and partook in the Liberation of Paris. In October 1940, General Charles de Gaulle arrived to Bangui to visit Governor Pierre Marie de Saint-Mart and review the troops.

=== Independence ===
Soon after the second World War, France adopted a new constitution in 1946 and granted full French citizenship to residents of the Ubangi-Shari and allowed for the establishment of local assemblies within the new French Union. In December 1958, former Catholic Priest Barthélemy Boganda became head of government of the Ubangi-Shari Territory. In March 1959, Boganda was killed when his airplane exploded and he was replaced by his cousin, David Dacko. On 13 August 1960, Ubangi-Shari obtained its independence from France and changed its name to the Central African Republic (CAR) and Dacko became the country's first President. France had actively propped up Dacko, discarding figures such as Abel Goumba whom it perceived as overly nationalistic and anti-French.

=== Post-independence ===
==== 20th century ====
France retained a high degree of involvement in Central African politics throughout the Cold War.

In December 1965, a coup d'état was launched against President Dacko and Army Commander Jean-Bédel Bokassa declared himself President of CAR. Bokassa's coup took place with support or tacit approval of France, which had grown weary of Dacko due to his government establishing relations with China in 1964. In 1975, French President Valéry Giscard d'Estaing attended the France-Africa Summit held in Bangui. President Giscard was known to visit the country several times and partook in hunting expeditions with Bokassa. In December 1976, President Bokassa declared himself Emperor of the Central African Republic and his coronation ceremony amounted to approx. US$20 million, which was equivalent to the GDP of the nation for an entire year. The French government provided substantial material support to the ceremony.

Due to fears over Bokassa's rapprochement to Muammar Gaddafi's Libya as well as widespread human rights abuses including the Ngaragba Prison massacre, the French intelligence service SDECE removed Bokassa from power in a 1979 intervention codenamed Operation Caban, carried out while the Emperor was on an official trip in Libya. David Dacko was re-instated as President of CAR and Bokassa was later offered asylum in France. In October 1979, the French newspaper Le Canard enchaîné ran a piece stating that President Giscard had accepted two diamonds while Minister of Finance in 1973 by Bokassa. The scandal became known as the Diamonds Affair (Affaire des diamants).

Operation Caban was followed up by Operation Barracuda, its counterpart carried out by the regular military and troupes de marine (instead of the SDECE) to stabilize the new regime over the course of the next two years. However, France went on to support André Kolingba in his 1981 coup against Dacko. The French military advisor Jean-Claude Mantion, a SDECE and DGSE officer who had been implied in the 1981 coup, had been installed at the head of the Presidential Guard under Dacko shortly before the coup took place. Mantion maintained this position throughout the entirety of the Kolingba era. This led him to be described as a "proconsul" and as "the president of President Kolingba", implying he was even more powerful than Kolingba himself.

In 1997, Central African President Ange-Félix Patassé negotiated the Bangui Agreements to bring an end to the 1990s conflict between government and rebel forces. As a result of the agreements, France closed its military base in Bouar in 1998. Ties to France became less pronounced during the Patassé era.

==== 21st century ====
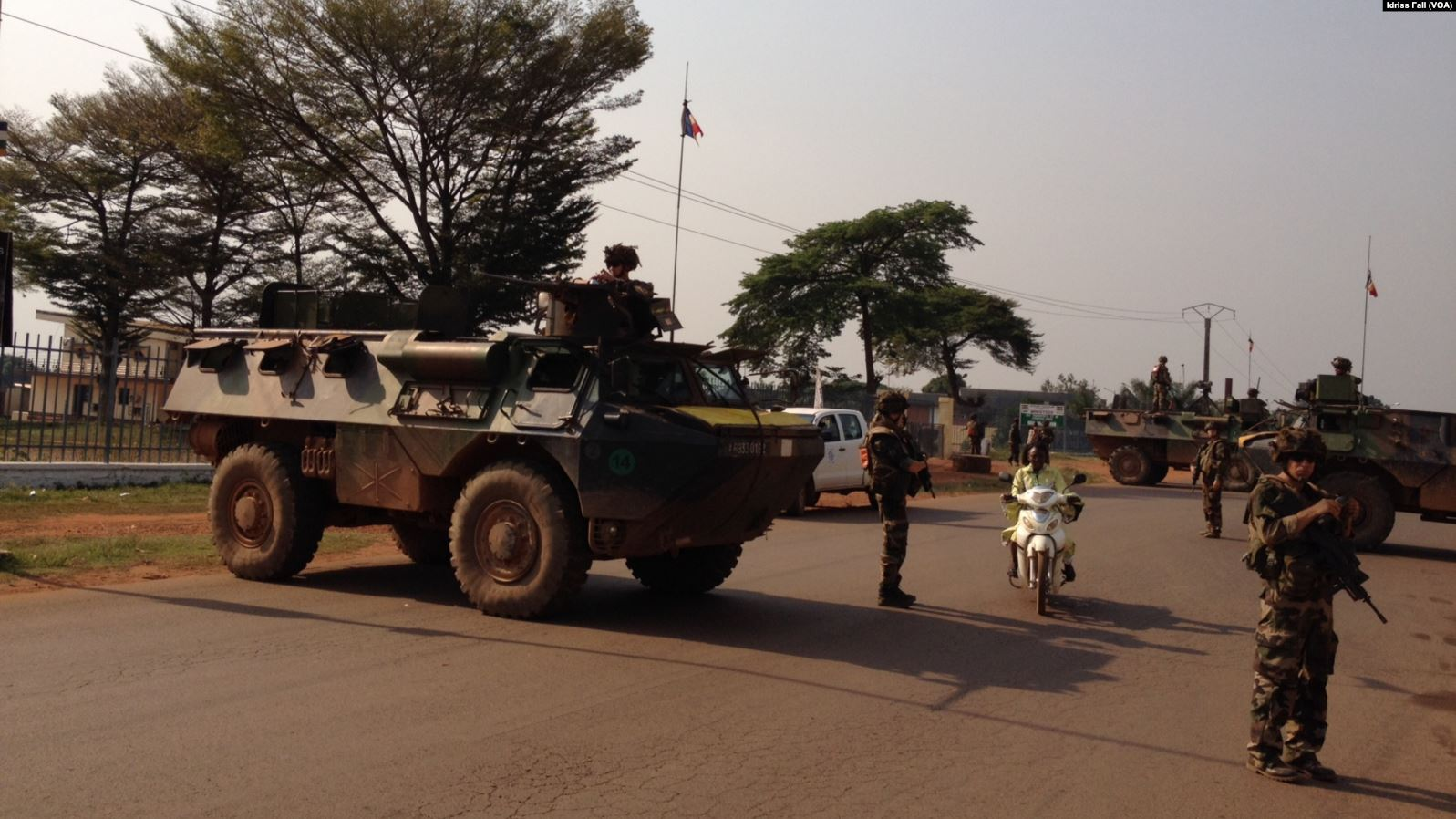
French soldiers in Bangui during Operation Sangaris, 2014.

After the 2003 coup that brought François Bozizé to power, France again sent 300 troops to Bangui, initially to repatriate foreigners, but keeping them in place after a request from Bozizé. The military ties with France were further restored by sending the Foreign Legion general Jean-Pierre Pérez - who was also connected to the private military company EHC - to be Bozizé's counseller.

In March 2009, French troops were deployed to Bangui after reports that rebels were taking over the capital to remove President François Bozizé from power. In 2012, a civil war erupted in the Central African Republic when the Séléka militia composed of mostly Muslim rebels removed Bozizé from power in 2013, and installed Michel Djotodia as president. After the removal of Bozizé, a mainly Christian rebel group known as Anti-balaka rebelled against the government and Muslim nationals in the country. Séléka and government forces fought against Anti-balaka and targeted Christian nationals in the country. As a result of the religious and ethnic conflict in CAR, France returned to the CAR by deploying 1,000 troops and armored vehicles into the country to maintain peace known as Operation Sangaris which lasted from 2013 to 2016. French President François Hollande visited French troops in CAR in December 2013.

In the early stages of the intervention, France was also accused of cooperating with the Anti-balaka against Séléka, which helped cement Séléka's popularity among Muslim and Fula groups that suffered from Anti-balaka attacks and massacres. France officially ended Sangaris in 2016. President Hollande returned to CAR in May 2016 to oversee the removal of French troops from the country which concluded in October 2016 and met with newly elected President Faustin-Archange Touadéra.

The last French troops left in 2022, after bilateral relations significantly cooled due to the CAR's increasing ties to Russia under Touadéra.

== Aid ==
In 2014, France contributed €170 million Euros in aid to CAR. This aid money paid for civilian assistance in addition to military expenditure, humanitarian assistance, support of the electoral process, support for the end of the crisis and democratic governance in the country. At the donors' conference in Brussels on 17 November 2016, France announced €85 million in aid over three years, including €15 million for the "Bêkou" fund.

== Trade ==
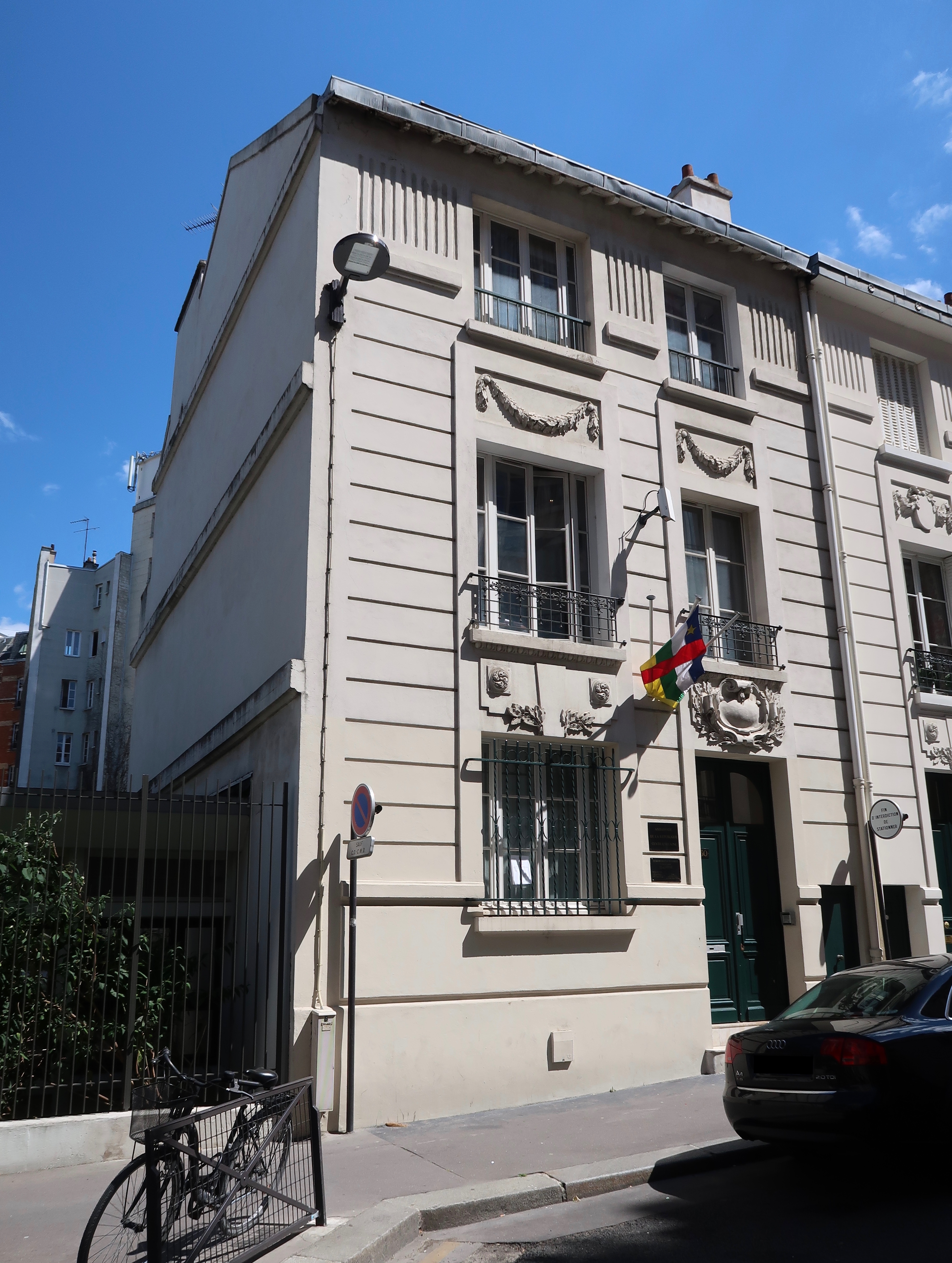
Embassy of the Central African Republic in Paris

In 2016, trade between the Central African Republic and France totalled US$50 million. French multi-national companies such as Air France and Orange S.A. operate in CAR.

As of 2022, imports from France accounted for $50,308 million, a significant decrease from €109,426 million in 2017.

== Resident diplomatic missions ==
- Central African Republic has an embassy in Paris.
- France has an embassy in Bangui.

== See also ==
- Françafrique
- Lycée Français Charles de Gaulle
