= Central African Republic–India relations =

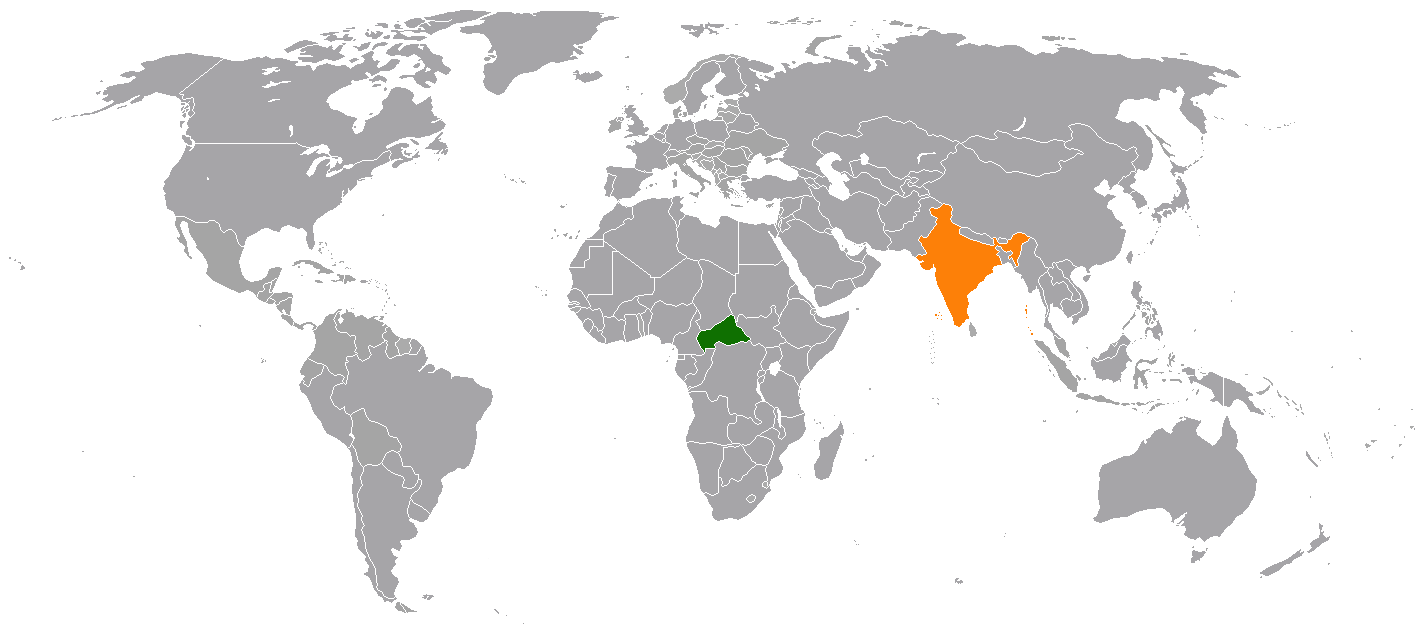
- Central African Republic: India

Central African Republic–India relations refers to the bilateral relations between the Central African Republic (CAR) and India. The Embassy of India in Kinshasa, Democratic Republic of the Congo is concurrently accredited to CAR. India also maintains an Honorary Consulate General in Bangui. CAR has no diplomatic mission in India.

== History ==
The Central African Republic and India signed an agreement to hold Foreign Office Consultations between the two Foreign Ministries on 3 September 2010, and the first such Consultation was held on 17 January 2011 in Bangui. Rajinder Bhagat, Joint Secretary (West Africa), MEA led the Indian delegation, while Foreign Minister General Antoine Gambi headed the CAR side.

Central African Minister of Small & Medium Enterprises, Deputy Minister for Finance, and Adviser to the President of CAR visited India in March 2010 to participate in the 6th CII-EXIM Bank conclave. Foreign Minister Lt. Gen. Antoine Gambi attended the LDC Foreign Ministers Conference in New Delhi in February 2011. Gambi visited India again in February 2011, along with the Minister of Economic Planning and International Cooperation Sylvain Maliko, Minister for Energy Jean Chrysostome Mekonndongo, and Minister for Communications Michel Koyt to attend the 7th CII-EXIM Bank Conclave for India Africa Project Partnership in New Delhi in February–March 2011.

CAR was the guest country at the 8th CII-EXIM Bank Conclave on India Africa Project Partnership in New Delhi in March 2012. Central African Prime Minister Faustin-Archange Touadéra led a high level delegation including 6 Cabinet ministers - Minister of Foreign Affairs, Minister of Transport, Minister of Energy and Hydraulic, Minister for Agriculture and Rural Development, Minister of Commerce, and Minister and Director of Cabinet of President, along with senior officials and members of the Chambers of Commerce of CAR attended the Conclave. Addressing the Conclave, Touadera stated that his nation was honoured to be the guest country at the Conclave, acknowledged the benefits of the lines of credit (LoCs) provided by India, and invited Indian companies to get more involved in Africa. The CAR Prime Minister described Inda's growing influence in Africa as "a new eastern wind blowing over our continent". Touadera also met Indian Prime Minister Manmohan Singh. The CAR Government also invited India to invest in the country specifically in roads, railways, hydro-power and uranium mining.

Parfait Anicent Mbay, Second Vice Prime Minister and Minister of Foreign Affairs, African Integration, Francophone and Central Africans Abroad, visited Delhi to participate in the 9th CII-EXIM Bank Conclave for India-Africa Project Partnership in March 2013. CAR delegate Gaudeuille Nee Medou Juliene Desiree represented the country at the third India-Africa Forum Summit in New Delhi in October 2015.

In July 2022, Central African minister of Foreign Affairs Sylvie Baïpo-Temon held a telephonic conversation with the Indian Ministry of External Affairs to discuss the UN arms embargo against the CAR.

In May 2023, Touadéra visited the prestigious Doon School in Uttarakhand, where he reportedly met with members of the Gupta family.

== Trade ==
Bilateral trade between the Central African Republic and India is comparatively small as the former is a war-torn nation suffering from political instability. Trade between the two countries grew from US$1.13 million in 2004-05 to US$10 million in 2015–16. India exported $9.17 million worth of goods to CAR, and imported $830,000 in 2015–16. By 2022, this further increased to $25.3 million and $3.46 million, respectively.

== Foreign aid ==
CAR and India signed a Memorandum of Understanding (MoU) in March 2010 to establish an Information Technology (IT) Centre for Excellence in Bangui. On 3 September 2010, they signed an MoU to establish two learning stations under the Hole-in-Wall Computer Education project. The two stations were opened on 31 August 2011. Under the Pan-African e-Network project, India set up tele-education, tele-medicine and VVIP connectivity in Bangui.

India extended an LoC of $29.5 million to set up a 400 MT/day cement plant in Bangui. CAR availed a line of credit of $20 million from India for limestone mining for the cement plant in Bangui. The contract for the project was awarded to Indian firm Jaguar Overseas Ltd. In early 2014, however, Jaguar was forced to evacuate its personnel from Bangui due to the instability in the CAR. Officials from Jaguar Overseas Ltd. and the EXIM Bank visited CAR in August 2016 to assess the progress of the project. The plant had almost been complete at the time the Indian workers were evacuated, but had since been damaged by rebels.

India provided CAR with a line of credit of $5.5 million to purchase 100 buses, spare parts, and to construct a bus workshop. India supplied CAR with the buses and spare parts, constructed the bus workshop and handed it over to CAR authorities by 2011. However, the majority of the buses have since been damaged by civil unrest in the country, and as of December 2016, only two of the 100 buses are in operation. Further, the bus workshop was destroyed by rebels. CAR signed an agreement to receive a line of credit worth $39.69 million to build two hydroelectric projects. However, India has put the agreement on hold as CAR failed to repay its pending dues to EXIM Bank for previously issued lines of credit. The CAR Government has requested loan restructuring.

Citizens of CAR are eligible for scholarships under the Indian Technical and Economic Cooperation Programme (ITEC) and the Indian Council for Cultural Relations. Many Central African women have attended the ITEC training course on solar electrification and rooftop water harvesting at Barefoot College in Tilonia, Rajasthan.

== Indians in the CAR ==
As on 8 December 2016, there were 66 Indians residing in CAR, of whom 45 were employed by the UN peacekeeping mission, MINUSCA. The rest of the community was primarily involved in trading activities. This number remained stable by September 2023, when the Indian government restated there were "about 60-70 Indians" in the country.

=== 2013 shooting ===
On 26 March 2013, two Indians were shot dead and 6 injured when the vehicles they were traveling in were fired upon by French troops patrolling the Bangui M'Poko International Airport. The three vehicles carrying 15 Indians, as well as some Chad nationals, had reportedly attempted to enter the airport facility when they were attacked. According to the French military, troops assigned to protect the airport had just been fired upon by an "unknown source" when they spotted the three vehicles attempting to enter the airport. France claimed that the vehicles did not stop even after firing warning shots. Believing that the vehicles were attempting to forcibly enter the airport, French troops then intervened in what they described as a "particularly confusing situation" and opened fire on the vehicles. The injured were then transported to a French military hospital in Chad.

French President François Hollande expressed distress at the death of innocents, as well as his regret and condolences over the killings. The French President promised to investigate the incident, and assured that the injured would receive treatment from French medical teams. In a letter to Prime Minister Manmohan Singh, Hollande stated that he had directed French troops in CAR to ensure the safety of the nearly 100 Indians in the country.
