= Central African Republic–Russia relations =

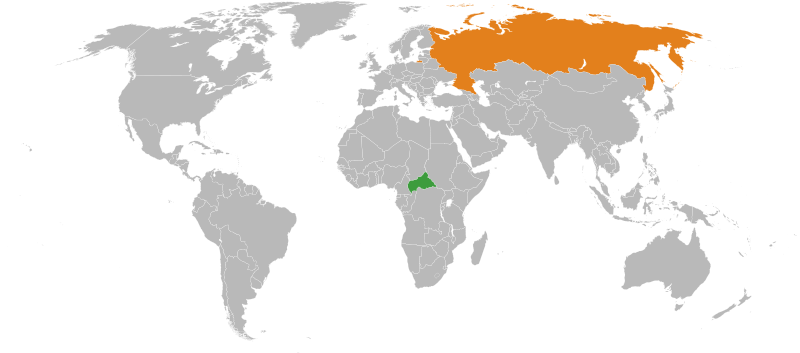
- Central African Republic: Russia

Envoy
- Ambassador Leon Dodonu-Punagaza: Ambassador Alexander Bikantov

Central African Republic–Russia relations are the bilateral relations between the Central African Republic and Russia. Both countries established diplomatic relations on 7 December 1960 Relations have been historically strained especially under the Soviet Union, however the countries have become close allies since the rise of President Faustin-Archange Touadéra.

== Diplomatic missions ==
The Central African Republic has an embassy in the Troparyovo-Nikulino District of Moscow. Russia has an embassy in Bangui.

== Relations with the Soviet Union ==
The Central African Republic took part in the boycott of the 1980 Summer Olympics in Moscow.

== Relations with the Russian Federation ==
=== Pre-Touadéra presidency ===
In 2014, The Central African Republic joined most of the world in voting in favor of United Nations General Assembly Resolution 68/262, which was in condemnation of the Annexation of Crimea by the Russian Federation.

=== Touadéra presidency ===
In March 2018, Russia agreed to provide free military aid to the Central African Republic, sending small arms, ammunition, and 175 instructors to train the Central African Armed Forces. The advisers are believed to be members of the Wagner Group. It was Russia's largest military deployment to Africa since the end of the Cold War and the collapse of the Soviet Union. As of January 2019, the CAR is considering hosting a Russian Armed Forces base. A former Russian intelligence official has been installed by the Central African president as his top security adviser.

=== Since the 2022 Russian invasion of Ukraine ===
On November 14, 2022, the Central African Republic sided with the Russian Federation on a UN General Assembly vote calling for Russia to pay war reparations to Ukraine.

In 2023, President Faustin-Archange Touadéra expressed support for Russian involvement in Ukraine.

In 2023, the Central African Republic was one of 14 countries to vote against A/C.3/78/L.42 titled "Situation of human rights in the temporarily occupied territories of Ukraine, including the Autonomous Republic of Crimea and the city of Sevastopol."

The Central African Republic is one of six African countries to be part of the free Russian grain deal. The other five countries are Somalia, and four other allies along with the Central African Republic. These four allies are Burkina Faso, Eritrea, Mali, and Zimbabwe.

== See also ==
- List of ambassadors of Russia to the Central African Republic
- Foreign relations of the Central African Republic
- Foreign relations of Russia
