= Central African passport =

Passport issued to citizens of the Central African Republic

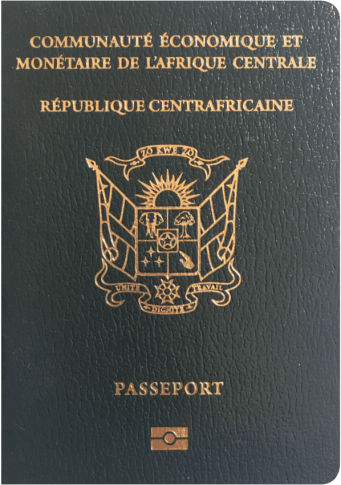
- The front cover of a Central African passport
- Type: Passport
- Issued by: Central African Republic
- Purpose: Identification, Travel
- Eligibility: Central African citizenship

The Central African passport is issued to citizens of the Central African Republic for international travel.

== Visa requirements ==
As of 1 January 2017, Central African Republic citizens had visa-free or visa on arrival access to 46 countries and territories, ranking the Central African Republic passport 89th in terms of travel freedom (tied with Equatorial Guinean passport) according to the Henley Passport Index.

The data page/information page is printed in French, the official language of the country.

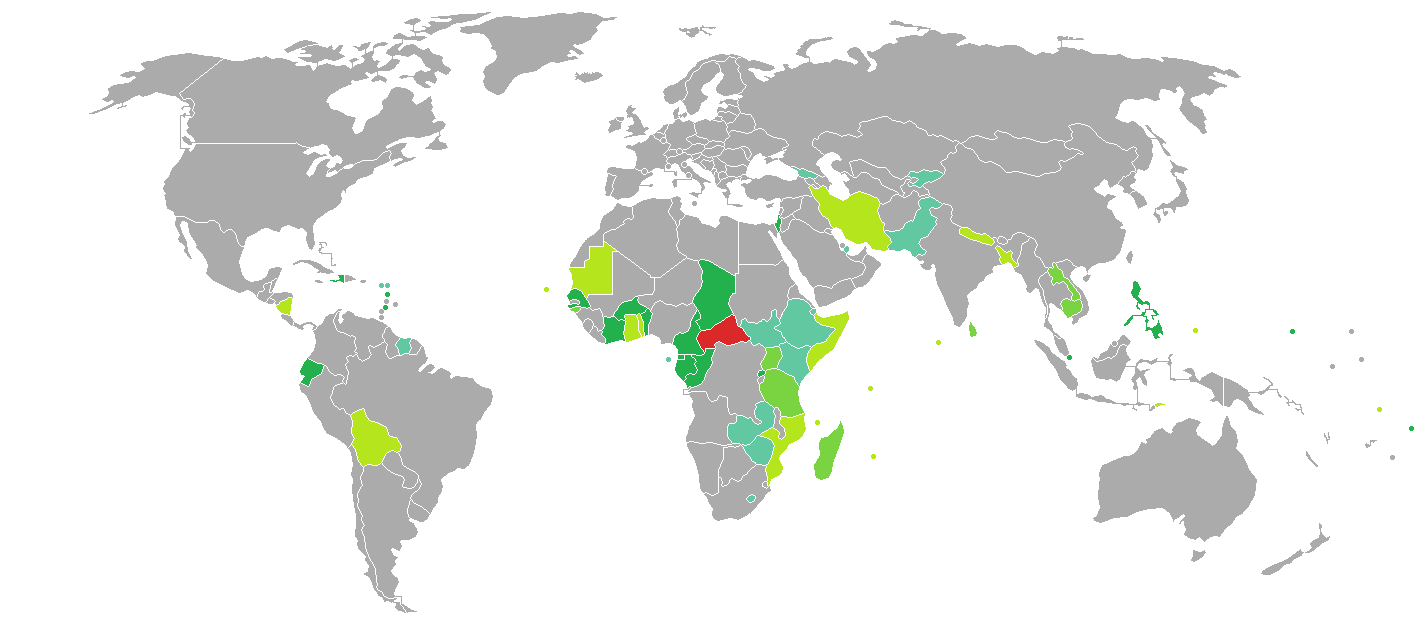
Visa requirements for Central African citizens Central African Republic Visa not required Visa obtainable on arrival eVisa Visa available both on arrival or online Visa required

== See also ==
- List of passports
