= List of diplomatic missions in the Central African Republic =

This is a list of diplomatic missions in the Central African Republic. At present, the capital city of Bangui hosts 17 embassies (not including honorary consulates).

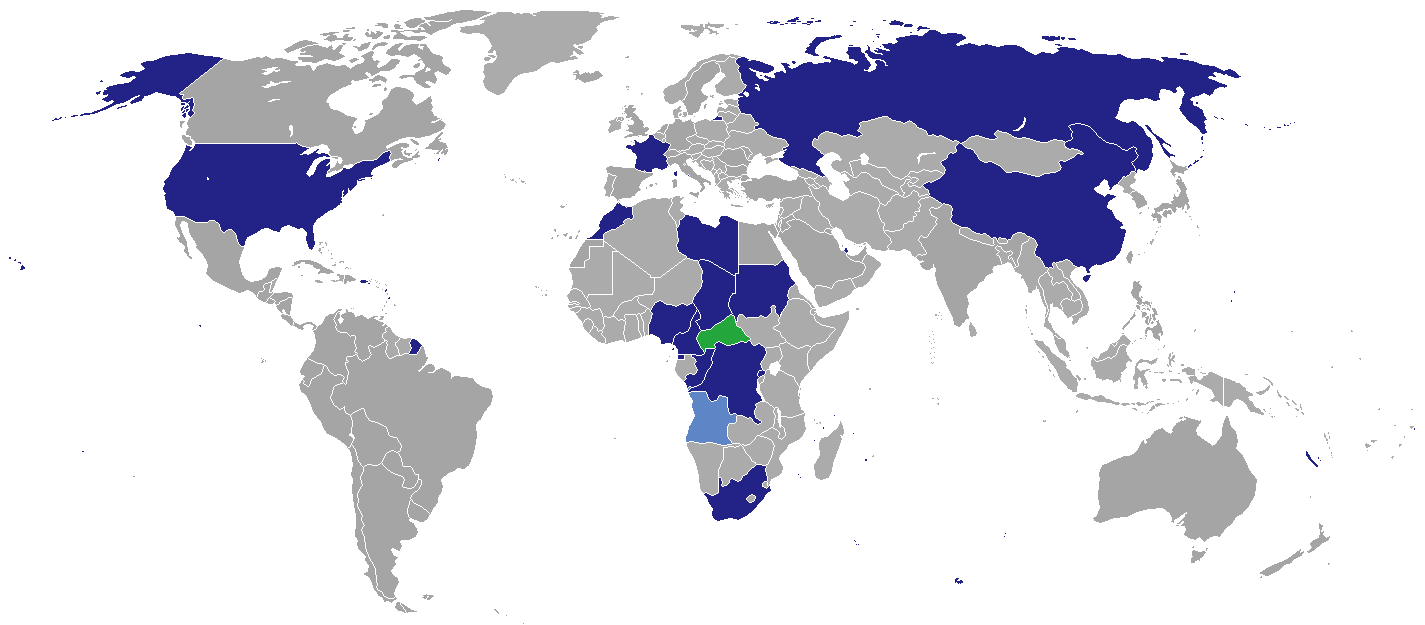
Map of diplomatic missions in the Central African Republic

== Diplomatic missions in Bangui ==
=== Embassies ===
1. Cameroon
2. Chad
3. China
4. Congo-Brazzaville
5. Congo-Kinshasa
6. Equatorial Guinea
7. France
8. Holy See
9. Libya
10. Morocco
11. Nigeria
12. Qatar
13. Russia
14. Rwanda
15. South Africa
16. Sudan
17. United States

=== Other delegations or representation ===
1. European Union (Delegation)

== Missions to open ==
=== Bangui ===
- Turkey

== Consular missions ==
=== Bangui ===
- Angola

=== Birao ===
- Sudan

=== Bouar ===
- Cameroon

== Non-resident embassies ==
=== Resident in Abuja ===
- Argentina
- Austria
- Bangladesh
- Benin
- Czech Republic
- Finland
- Guinea
- Hungary
- Iran
- Ireland
- Kenya
- Lebanon
- Liberia
- Malaysia
- Philippines
- Sierra Leone
- Slovakia
- Thailand
- Togo

=== Resident in Brazzaville ===
- Algeria
- Brazil
- Cuba
- Denmark
- Italy

=== Resident in Khartoum ===
- Jordan
- Norway
- Netherlands
- Yemen (Note: Consular affairs only. As of 25 January 2022, this country/territory has not established relations with Central African Republic.)

=== Resident in Kinshasa ===
- Greece
- United Kingdom
- India
- Portugal
- Turkey
- Tanzania
- Uganda

=== Resident in Paris ===
- Croatia
- Peru
- Panama
- Vietnam

=== Resident in Yaoundé ===
- Belgium
- Canada
- Egypt
- Germany
- Indonesia
- Ivory Coast
- Israel
- Japan
- Spain
- South Korea
- Senegal
- Switzerland
- Tunisia
- United Kingdom

=== Resident in other places ===
- Australia (Addis Ababa)
- Colombia (Addis Ababa)
- Ethiopia (Kigali)
- Kyrgyzstan (Riyadh)
- Maldives (Riyadh)
- Mali (Libreville)
- Marshall Islands (New York City)
- Mexico (New York City)
- New Zealand (Addis Ababa)
- Niger (N'Djamena)
- Poland (Luanda)
- Paraguay (Pretoria)
- Romania (Addis Ababa)
- Saudi Arabia (N'Djamena)
- Serbia (New York City)
- Seychelles (Addis Ababa)
- South Sudan (Juba)
- Sweden (Kampala)
- United Arab Emirates (N'Djamena)
- Venezuela (New York City)
- Zimbabwe (Kigali)

== Former embassies ==
- Egypt (Note: Resident in Yaounde, Cameroon)
- Japan(1992)
- North Korea (Closed 4 April 1991)
- Romania (Note: Resident in Addis Ababa, Ethiopia) (1996)
- South Korea (Closed 1989)
- South Vietnam
- United Kingdom (Note: Resident in Kinshasa, Democratic Republic of Congo)
