= José Antonio Infantes Florido =

Spanish Roman Catholic Bishop

His Most Reverend José Antonio Infantes Florido
- Emeritus Bishop of Córdoba
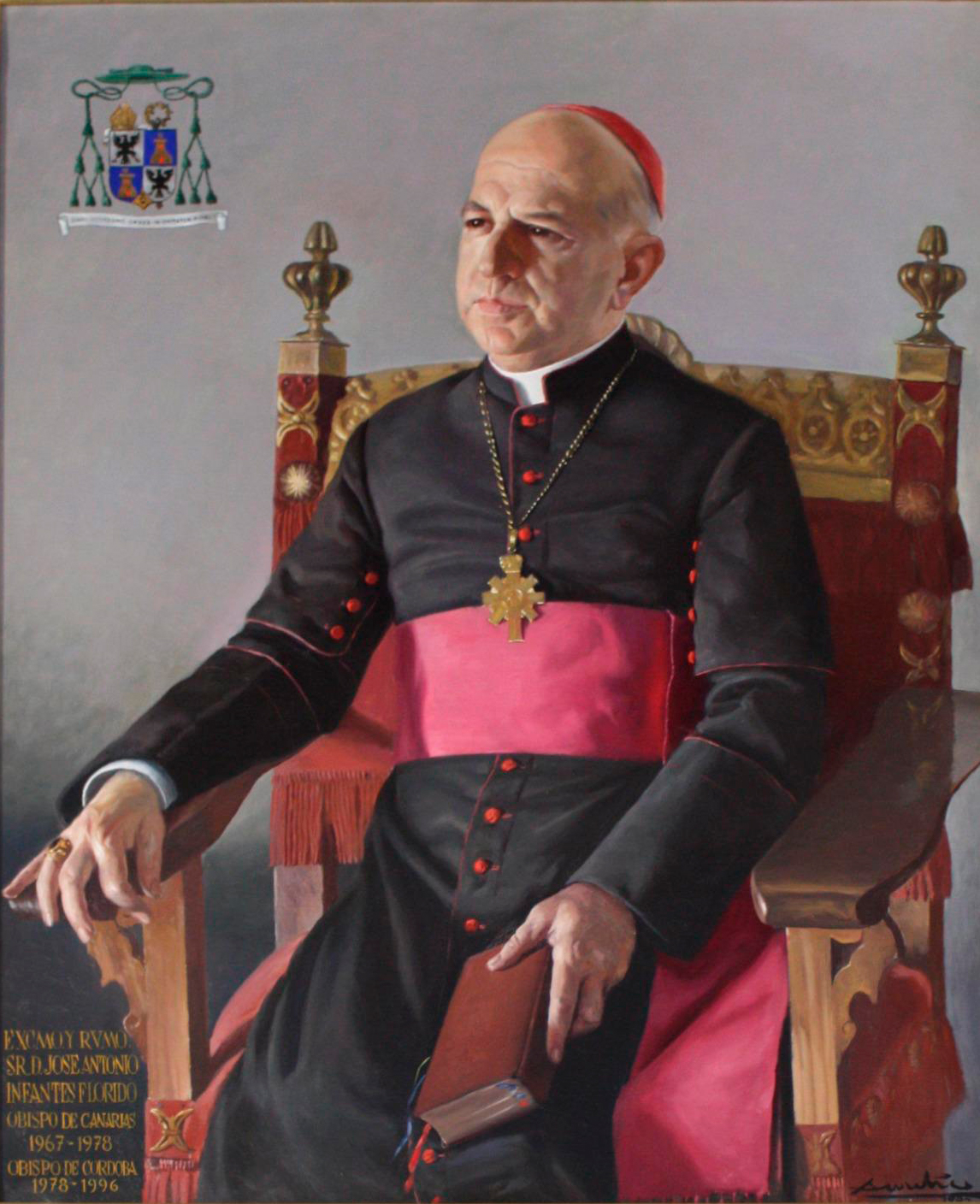
- Que lleguemos a la unidad de la fe
- Archdiocese: Seville
- Diocese: Córdoba
- Predecessor: José María Cirarda Lachiondo
- Successor: Francisco Javier Martínez Fernández

Orders
- Ordination: 19 May 1951
- Consecration: 21 September 1967 by José Bueno y Monreal

Personal details
- Denomination: Roman Catholic
- Motto: Que lleguemos a la unidad de la fe

José Antonio Infantes Florido (born in Almadén de la Plata Spain, 24 January 1920 - died Gelves, 6 November 2005) was a Spanish Roman Catholic bishop.

== Priesthood ==
He studied in the seminary of Valencia and on 19 May 1951 he was ordained a priest.

== Episcopal ministry ==
On 20 July 1967, Pope Paul VI appointed him bishop of the Diocese of Canarias, which covers the three islands of Gran Canaria, Lanzarote and Fuertaventura in the Spanish Canary Islands, he was consecrated on 21 September of that year with Cardinal José Bueno y Monreal, Archbishop of Seville, being the chief celebrant. On 25 May 1978 he was appointed Bishop of Córdoba. On 15 March 1996, having reach the obligatory retirement age, Pope John Paul II accepted his resignation.

== Death ==
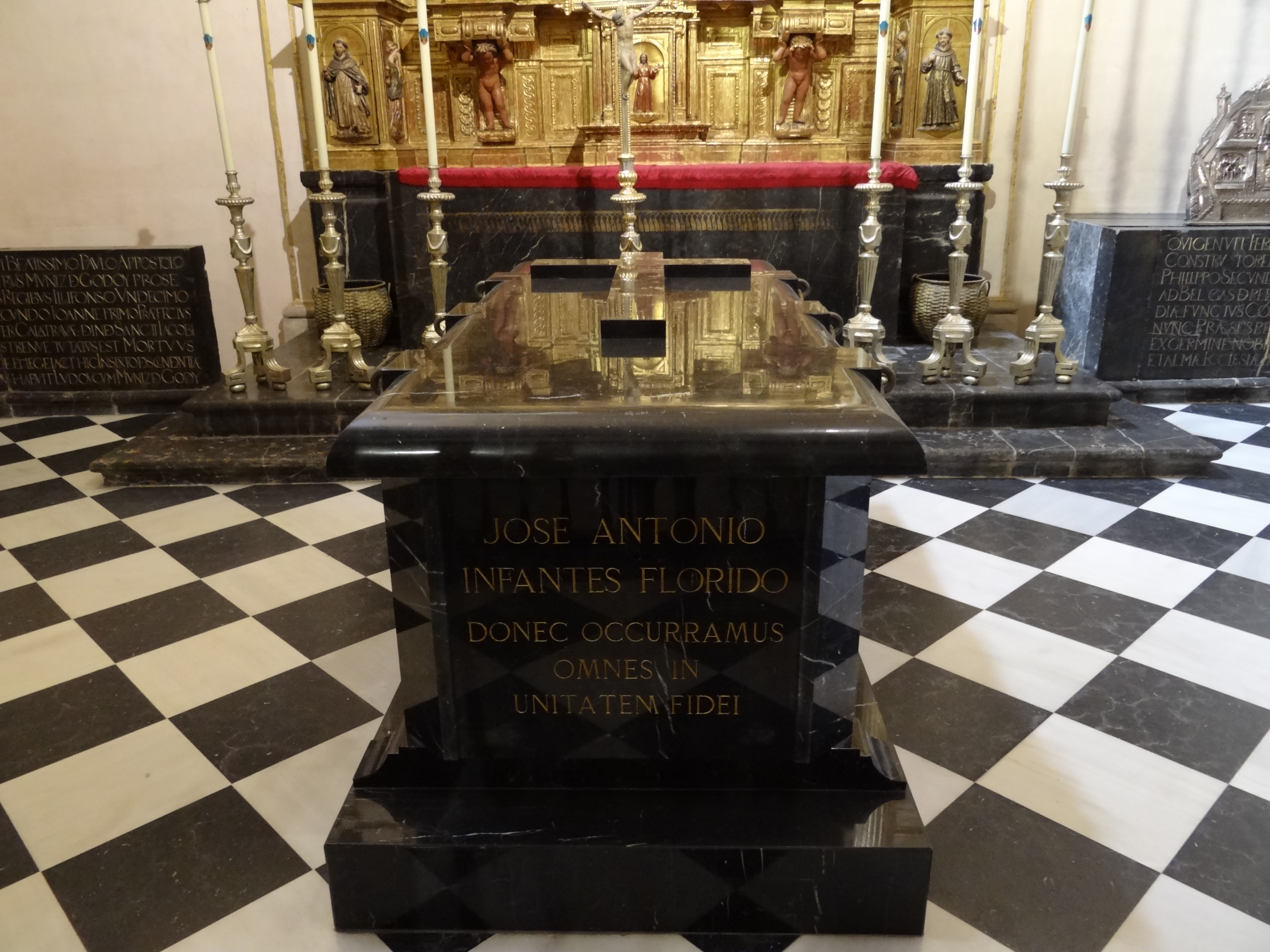
Tomb of José Antonio Infantes Florido in the Mosque–Cathedral of Córdoba (Spain).

He died in his home in Gelves on 6 November 2005 at the age of 85.

== See also ==
- Diocese of Canarias
- Diocese of Córdoba

Catholic Church titles
Preceded by Antonio Victor Pildáin y Zapiáin	Bishop of Canarias; 1967-1978	Succeeded by Ramón Echarren Istúriz
Preceded by José María Cirarda Lachiondo	Bishop of Córdoba; 1978-1996	Succeeded by Francisco Javier Martínez Fernández
