= Buenaventura Codina y Augerolas =

Spanish prelate of the Catholic Church (1788–1857)

Servant of God Buenaventura Codina y Augerolas
- Bishop of Canarias
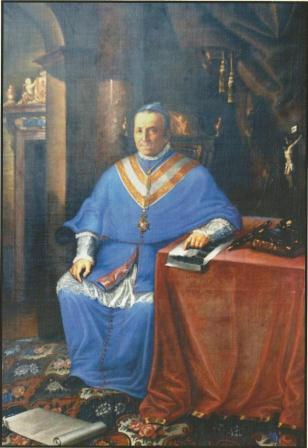
- Church: Catholic
- Diocese: Canarias
- Appointed: 16 September 1846
- In office: 1847 – 1857
- Predecessor: Judas José Romo y Gamboa
- Successor: Joaquín Lluch y Garriga

Orders
- Ordination: c. 1810
- Consecration: 20 February 1848 by Giovanni Brunelli

Personal details
- Born: 3 June 1788 Hostalric, Spain, Spanish Empire
- Died: 18 November 1857 (aged 69) Canary Islands, Spanish Empire
- Resting place: Chapel of Our Lady of Los Dolores, Cathedral of Santa Ana

Buenaventura Codina y Augerolas (3 June 1788 – 18 November 1857) was a Spanish prelate of the Catholic Church who served as Bishop of Canarias, which covers the islands of Fuerteventura, Gran Canaria and Lanzarote in the Canary Islands.

== Biography ==
Born in Hostalric in 1788, Codina was ordained a priest in 1810 and was appointed Bishop of Canarias in 1847 by Pope Pius IX; he held this position until his death in 1857.

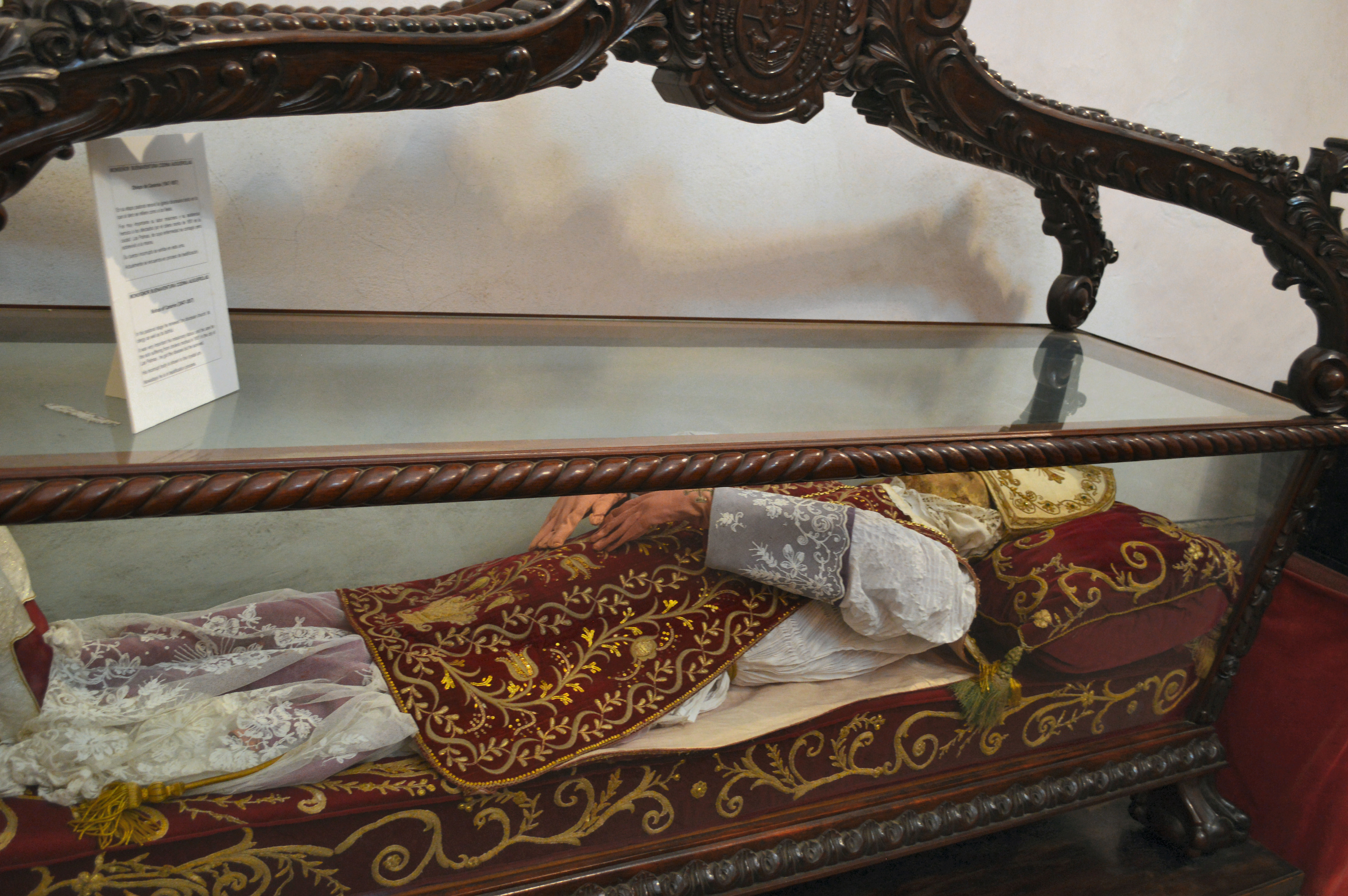
Cathedral of Santa Ana

In 1978, his body was exhumed from the crypt of the Cathedral of Santa Ana and was found to be in an incorrupt state, and is now on display in the Chapel of Our Lady of Los Dolores. He was declared a Servant of God and his case for beatification continues.

== See also ==
- Diocese of Tenerife

Catholic Church titles
Preceded by Judas José Romo y Gamboa	Bishop of Canarias; 1848 – 1857	Succeeded by Joaquín Lluch y Garriga
