= Miguel de los Santos Serra y Sucarrats =

Spanish Roman Catholic bishop

His Most Reverend Miguel de los Santos Serra y Sucarrats
- Bishop of Sergorbe
- Archdiocese: Valencia
- Diocese: Sergorbe
- Predecessor: Luis Amigó Ferrer
- Successor: Ramón Sanahuja y Marcé

Orders
- Ordination: 16 April 1892
- Consecration: 7 October 1923 by Francisco Vidal y Barraquer

Personal details
- Denomination: Roman Catholic

Miguel de los Santos Serra y Sucarrats (11 January 1868 – 9 August 1936) was a Spanish prelate of the Roman Catholic church and Bishop of Sergorbe.

== Biography ==
Serra was born on 11 January 1868 in Olot in Girona Spain. He studied for the priesthood and was ordained on 16 April 1892. On 14 December 1922, Pope Pius XI named him bishop of the Diocese of Canarias - part of the Canary Islands and took office on 7 October 1923. He was translated to the diocese of Sergorbe 16 January 1936.

== Death ==
Serra, along with other religious including his brother, was shot dead during the persecution of religious in Spain on 9 August 1936.

== See also ==
- Diocese of Canarias
- Diocese of Sergorbe

Catholic Church titles
Preceded by Ángel Marquina y Corrales	Bishop of Canarias; 1923-1936	Succeeded by Antonio Victor Pildáin y Zapiáin
Preceded by Luis Amigó Ferrer	Bishop of Segorbe; 1936-1936	Succeeded by Ramón Sanahuja y Marcé
