= Rexach =

Rexach is a surname. Notable people with the surname include:

- Carles Rexach (born 1947), Spanish footballer and manager
- Eduardo Serra Rexach (born 1946), Spanish politician and businessman
- Félix Benítez Rexach (1886–1975), Puerto Rican engineer and businessman
- Jaime Benítez Rexach (1908–2001), Puerto Rican author, academic, and politician
- Juan Rexach (fl. 1431–1482), Spanish painter and miniaturist
- Roberto Rexach Benítez (1929–2012), Puerto Rican politician
- Sylvia Rexach (1922–1961), Puerto Rican scriptwriter, poet, singer, and composer
