= Jacomart =

Spanish painter

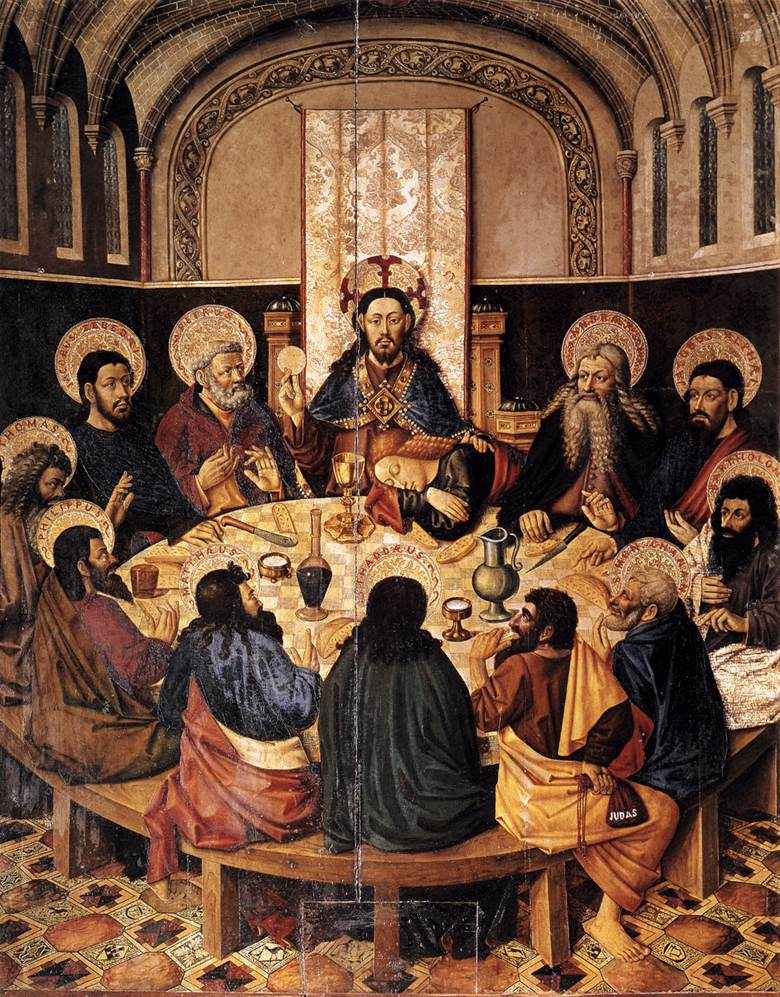
The Last Supper, c. 1450s, from the Cathedral of Segorbe.

Jaume Baçó, also spelled Baco or Jacomart (c. 1410–1461), was a Spanish painter from Valencia.

Most of his life is scarcely documented. He worked in his native city until 1442, when he was called to Naples by Alfonso V of Aragon. He had a deep influence on the local school, including artists such as Colantonio, and in 1445 he returned to Valencia. One year later he was again in Italy, again by the king's request. In that occasion he visited Rome and Tivoli, where he knew cardinal Alfonso Borgia, the future pope Calixtus III. In 1451 he was back to Valencia, remaining there for the rest of his life.

His style did not absorb the influences of Italian Renaissance, but kept the strong influence of Early Netherlandish painting. He left an altarpiece in the church of Santa Maria della Pace, now lost. Jacomart's only documented work is the Retable of Catì, a late work (1460) in collaboration with his follower Juan Rexach. Other works are only attributed, such as the Borgia Triptych in the Collegiate church of Xàtiva, and the panels with St. Benedict and St. Ildephonsus in the Cathedral of Valencia.

== Sources ==
- Zuffi, Stefano (2004). Il Quattrocento. Milan: Electa. ISBN 88-370-2315-4.
