= Francisco Moya (bishop) =

Spanish Roman Catholic prelate

Most Reverend Francisco Moya
- Bishop of Rubicón
- Church: Catholic Church
- Diocese: Diocese of Rubicón
- In office: 1436–?

Orders
- Consecration: 27 Oct 1436 by André Dias de Escobar

Francisco Moya, O.F.M. was a Roman Catholic prelate who served as Bishop of Rubicón (1436–?).

== Biography ==
Francisco Moya was ordained a priest in the Order of Friars Minor. On 26 Sep 1436, he was appointed during the papacy of Pope Eugene IV as Bishop of Rubicón. On 27 Oct 1436, he was consecrated bishop by André Dias de Escobar, Titular Bishop of Megara. It is uncertain how long he served as Bishop of Rubicón; the next bishop of record is Juan de Frías, who was appointed in 1474.

== External links and additional sources ==
- Cheney, David M. "Diocese of Islas Canarias". Catholic-Hierarchy.org. (for Chronology of Bishops)^{self-published}
- Chow, Gabriel. "Diocese of Islas Canarias {Canary Islands} (Spain)". GCatholic.org. (for Chronology of Bishops)^{self-published}

Catholic Church titles
Preceded by	Bishop of Rubicón; 1436–?	Succeeded by
