= Diocese of Canarias =

Diocese of the Catholic Church in Spain

Coordinates: 28.1008°N 15.4151°W

Diocese of Canarias Dioecesis Canariensis Diócesis de Canarias

Catholic
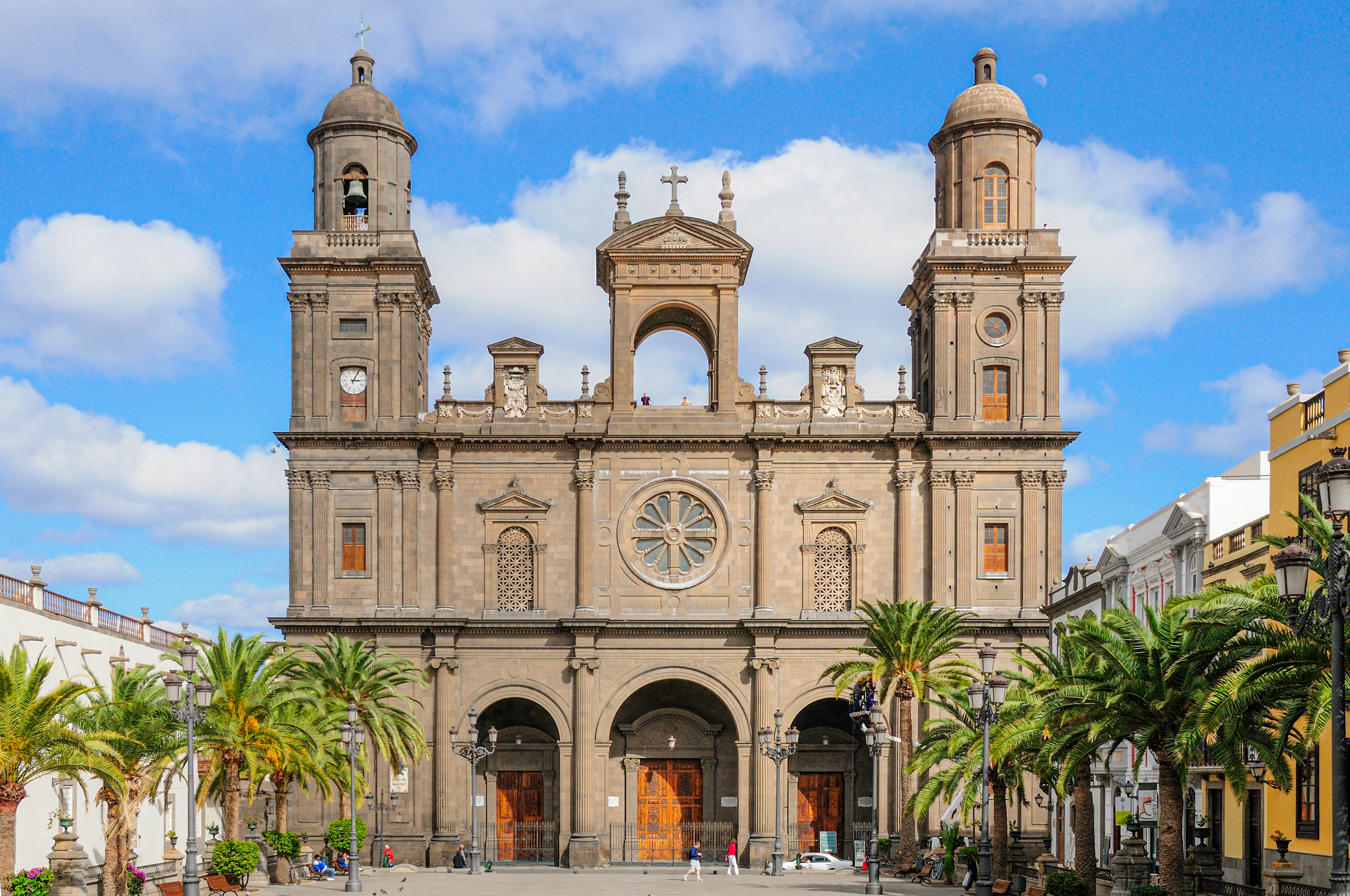
- Las Palmas Cathedral

Location
- Country: Spain
- Ecclesiastical province: Seville
- Metropolitan: Seville

Statistics
- Area: 4,106 km^{2} (1,585 sq mi)
- Population: Total; Catholics: (as of 2006); 1,011,928; 860,139 (85.0%)

Information
- Denomination: Roman Catholic
- Rite: Latin Rite
- Established: 7 July 1406
- Cathedral: Cathedral Basilica of St Anne in Las Palmas

Current leadership
- Pope: Leo XIV
- Bishop: José Mazuelos Pérez
- Metropolitan Archbishop: José Ángel Saiz Meneses
- Bishops emeritus: Francisco Cases Andreu

Map

Website
- Website of the Diocese

The Diocese of Canarias or Diocese Canariense-Rubicense (Latin: Dioecesis Canariensis) is a Latin diocese of the Catholic Church located in the Canary Islands in the ecclesiastical province of Seville in Spain. The dioceses includes the islands of Gran Canaria, Fuerteventura and Lanzarote (Oriental Province). However, it does not include the whole archipelago, since the Roman Catholic Diocese of San Cristóbal de La Laguna (or Tenerife or Nivariense) includes the Province of Santa Cruz de Tenerife.

== History ==
=== Diocese of Fortuna islands and Diocese of Rubicon ===
In 1351, Pope Clement VI issued the bull "Coelestis rex regum", which established the diocese of the Islas de la Fortuna, separating it from the diocese of Majorca. In 1369 Pope Urban V issued a bull renaming it the Diocese of Telde, extending its jurisdiction to the island of Gran Canaria. In 1441 this diocese was abolished.

On July 7, 1404, Pope Benedict XIII issued the bull "Romanus Pontifex", which established the Diocese of Rubicon, which extended its jurisdiction to the island of Lanzarote. On November 20, 1424, the Diocese of Rubicón ceded part of its territory for the construction of the Diocese of Fuerteventura, which was dissolved in 1433, its territory passing into the hands of the Diocese of Rubicón.

=== Diocese of the Canary Islands ===
On August 25, 1435, Pope Eugene IV issued a decree transferring the seat of the Diocese of Rubicon to the city of Las Palmas de Gran Canaria. In 1485, the Diocese of Rubicon was renamed the Diocese of the Canary Islands and Rubicon.

The first two native saints of the Canary Islands, Joseph of Anchieta (1534-1597) and Peter of Betancur (1626-1667), although of Tenerife origin, were born in this diocese when it still included the entire archipelago. Considered the two most important religious figures that the Canary Islands have given, they carried out great missionary and apostolic work on the American continent.

In 1630, the Diocese of the Canary Islands ceded part of its territory to form the Apostolic Prefecture of Tripoli (today the Apostolic Vicariate of Tripoli).

In 1787, 746 diocesan priests were registered, including secular and regular clergy. At the end of the 18th century, the diocese comprised 36 parishes with benefices, whose parish priests were appointed by the king, and 50 "cural" parishes, whose parish priests were appointed by the bishops and received a salary from the diocesan curia. The majority of the parishes were located on the island of Tenerife, with 16 charitable parishes and 22 curacies. The religious subdivision into parishes was used, at the beginning of the 19th century, for the administrative subdivision of the Canary Islands.

On February 1, 1819 and August 10, 1838, the Diocese of the Canary Islands ceded part of its territory for the construction of the new Diocese of San Cristóbal de la Laguna and the Diocese of Algiers (today the Archdiocese of Algeria). There are currently two dioceses in the Canary Islands, one of which, "Diocese of the Canary Islands", for this reason, the use of the name of the archipelago is currently a very controversial topic in the Canary Islands.

It has recently emerged between the society of Lanzarote the desire to recover the diocesan headquarters of Rubicon.

== Special churches ==
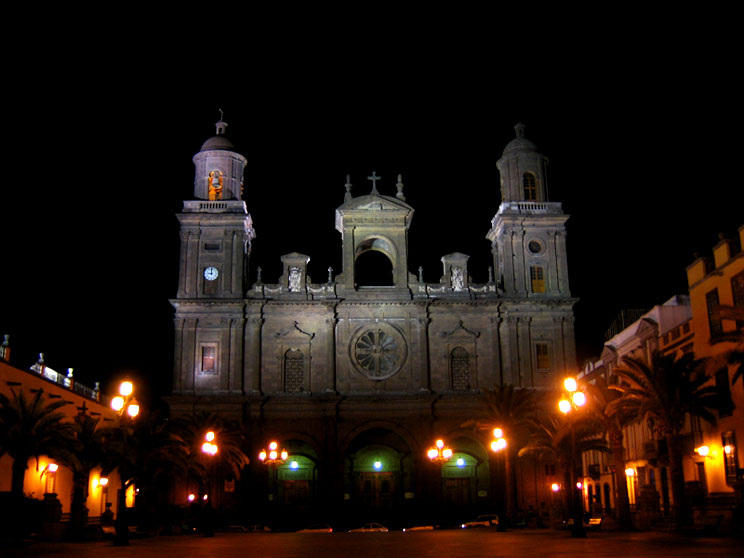
Catedral de Las Palmas de Gran Canaria

- Minor Basilicas:
  - Basílica de Nuestra Señora del Pino, Teror, Canarias

== Ordinaries ==
=== Diocese of Rubicón ===
Erected: 7 July 1406

- Fernando Calvetos, c. 1434-1436
- Francisco Moya (bishop), OFM (26 Sep 1436 Appointed – 1441)

...

- Juan de Frías (1474–1485 Died)

=== Diocese of Canaries ===
Name Changed: 1485

- Miguel López de la Serna, OFM (29 Mar 1486 – 1490 Died)

. . .

- Diego de Muros (27 Jun 1496 – 1507 Died)
- Pedro López Ayala (20 Oct 1507 – Feb 1513 Died)
- Fernando Vázquez de Arce (20 May 1513 – 1520 Died)
- Luis Cabeza de Vaca (11 Mar 1523 – 22 Jun 1530, Appointed, Bishop of Salamanca)
- Pedro Fernández Manrique (22 Jun 1530 – 14 Dec 1530 Appointed, Bishop of Ciudad Rodrigo)
- Juan de Salamanca, OP (6 Mar 1531 – 1538 Died)
- Alonso Ruiz de Virués, OSB (12 Aug 1538 – 19 Jan 1545 Died)
- Antonio de la Cruz (bishop), OFM (7 Dec 1545 – 1550 Died)
- Francisco de la Cerda Córdoba, OP (19 Jan 1551 – 14 Nov 1551 Died)
- Melchor Cano, OP (12 Sep 1552 – 1554 Resigned)
- Diego Deza Tello (30 Apr 1554 – 26 Apr 1566 Appointed, Bishop of Coria)
- Bartolomé Torres (bishop) (15 May 1566 – 1 Feb 1568 Died)
- Juan Alzóloras (Arzolaras), OSH (17 Sep 1568 – 7 May 1574 Died)
- Cristóbal Vela Tavera (15 Dec 1574 – 27 May 1580 Appointed, Archbishop of Burgos)
- Fernando Rueda (22 Jun 1580 – 17 Jun 1585 Died)
- Fernando Suárez de Figueroa (22 Jun 1587 – 26 Mar 1597 Appointed, Bishop of Zamora)
- Francisco Martínez de Cenicero (14 Apr 1597 – 13 Aug 1607 Appointed, Bishop of Cartagena (en España))
- Francisco de Sosa, OFM (3 Sep 1607 – 1610 Resigned)
- Juan Nicolás Valdés de Carriazo (26 Apr 1610 – 10 Oct 1611 Appointed, Bishop of Guadix)
- Lope Velasco Valdivieso (14 Nov 1611 – 29 Oct 1613 Died)
- Antonio Corrionero (6 Oct 1614 – 17 May 1621 Appointed, Bishop of Salamanca)
- Pedro Herrera Suárez, OP (7 Jun 1621 – 27 Jun 1622 Confirmed, Bishop of Tui)
- Juan Guzmán (archbishop), OFM (11 Jul 1622 – 6 Oct 1627 Appointed, Archbishop of Tarragona)
- Cristóbal de la Cámara y Murga (15 Nov 1627 – 7 May 1635 Appointed, Bishop of Salamanca)
- Francisco Sánchez Villanueva y Vega (9 Jul 1635 – 1651 Resigned)
- Rodrigo Gutiérrez de Rojas (3 Jul 1651 – 14 Dec 1658 Died)
- Juan Vande-Escarth y Briceño (loannes de Toledo), OSH (9 Jun 1659 – 12 Jan 1665 Appointed, Bishop of León)
- Bartolomé García Jiménez y Rabadán (16 Mar 1665 – 14 Jun 1690 Died)
- Bernardo de Vicuña Zuazo (12 Nov 1691 – 31 Jan 1705 Died)
- Juan Ruiz y Simón (22 Feb 1706 – 6 Jun 1712 Died)
- Lucas Conejero de Molina (28 May 1714 – 26 Jun 1724 Appointed, Archbishop of Burgos)
- Félix Bernuy Zapata y Mendoza (20 Nov 1724 – 23 May 1730 Died)
- Pedro Manuel Dávila y Cárdenas (6 Aug 1731 – 19 Dec 1738 Appointed, Bishop of Plasencia)
- Juan Francisco Guillén (30 Sep 1739 – 15 Mar 1751 Appointed, Archbishop of Burgos)
- Valentín Moran Menéndez, OdeM (15 Mar 1751 – 20 May 1761 Resigned)
- Francisco Javier Delgado y Venegas (25 May 1761 – 19 Dec 1768 Appointed, Bishop of Sigüenza)
- Juan Bautista Cervera, OFMDisc (12 Jun 1769 – 12 May 1777 Appointed, Bishop of Cádiz)
- Joaquín Herrera Bárcena, OCist (1 Mar 1779 – 4 Dec 1783 Died)
- Antonio Martínez de la Plaza (14 Feb 1785 – 29 Nov 1790 Appointed, Bishop of Cádiz)
- Antonio Tavira Almazán (11 Apr 1791 – 27 Jun 1796 Appointed, Bishop of Osma)
- Manuel Verdugo y Albiturría (27 Jun 1796 – 7 Jul 1818 Died)
- Manuel Bernardo Morete Bodelón (27 Sep 1824 – 21 Mar 1825 Confirmed, Bishop of Astorga)
- Fernando Cano Almirante, OFM (19 Dec 1825 – 22 Sep 1826 Died)
- Bernardo Martínez Carnero (21 May 1827 – 26 Jan 1833 Died)
- Judas José Romo y Gamboa (20 Jan 1834 – 17 Dec 1847 Confirmed, Archbishop of Sevilla)
- Buenaventura Codina y Augerolas, CM (17 Dec 1847 – 18 Nov 1857 Died)
- Joaquín Lluch y Garriga, OCD (27 Sep 1858 – 13 Mar 1868 Appointed, Bishop of Salamanca)
- José María de Urquinaona y Vidot (22 Jun 1868 – 15 Jul 1878 Appointed, Bishop of Barcelona)
- José Proceso Pozuelo y Herrero (28 Feb 1879 – 26 Jun 1890 Appointed, Bishop of Segovia)
- José Cueto y Díez de la Maza, OP (1 Jun 1891 – 17 Aug 1908 Died)
- Adolfo Pérez y Muñoz (29 Apr 1909 – 18 Jul 1913 Appointed, Bishop of Badajoz)
- Ángel Marquina y Corrales (18 Jul 1913 – 6 Sep 1922 Appointed, Bishop of Guadix)
- Miguel de los Santos Serra y Sucarrats (14 Dec 1922 – 16 Jan 1936 Appointed, Bishop of Segorbe)
- Antonio Victor Pildáin y Zapiáin (18 May 1936 – 15 Dec 1966 Retired)
- José Antonio Infantes Florido (20 Jul 1967 – 25 May 1978 Appointed, Bishop of Córdoba)
- Ramón Echarren Istúriz (27 Nov 1978 – 26 Nov 2005 Retired)
- Francisco Cases Andreu (26 Nov 2005 – 6 Jul 2020 Retired)
- José Mazuelos Pérez (6 Jul 2020 – )

== Saints and Blesseds ==
The diocese of the Canary Islands included the entire archipelago for more than four centuries, until 1819 when the diocese of San Cristóbal de La Laguna or Tenerife was created. For this reason, the saints and blesseds currently venerated in the archipelago were born in this diocese, and some of them are venerated equally in both Canarian bishoprics, especially those born or linked to the territory currently occupied by the diocese of Tenerife or Nivariense:

- Saint Peter of Betancur (also venerated by the diocese of Tenerife)
- Saint José de Anchieta (also venerated by the diocese of Tenerife)
- Blessed Martyrs of Tazacorte (also venerated by the diocese of Tenerife)
- Blessed Lorenza Díaz Bolaños
- Blessed Tomás Morales Morales
- Blessed José Torres Padilla (also venerated by the diocese of Tenerife)

== See also ==
- Roman Catholicism in Spain
