= Francisco de la Cerda Córdoba =

Bishop

Most Reverend Francisco de la Cerda Córdoba
- Bishop of Islas Canarias
- Church: Catholic Church
- Diocese: Diocese of Islas Canarias
- In office: 1551
- Predecessor: Antonio de la Cruz (bishop)
- Successor: Melchor Cano

Personal details
- Born: Córdoba, Spain
- Died: 14 November 1551

Francisco de la Cerda Córdoba, O.P. (died 1551) was a Roman Catholic prelate who served as Bishop of Islas Canarias (1551).

== Biography ==
Francisco de la Cerda Córdoba was born in Córdoba, Spain and ordained a priest in the Order of Preachers. On 19 Jan 1551, he was appointed during the papacy of Pope Julius III as Bishop of Islas Canarias. He served as Bishop of Islas Canarias until his death on 14 Nov 1551.

== See also ==
- Roman Catholicism in Spain

== External links and additional sources ==
- Cheney, David M. "Diocese of Islas Canarias". Catholic-Hierarchy.org. (for Chronology of Bishops) ^{[self-published]}
- Chow, Gabriel. "Diocese of Islas Canarias {Canary Islands} (Spain)". GCatholic.org. (for Chronology of Bishops) ^{[self-published]}

Catholic Church titles
Preceded by Antonio de la Cruz (bishop)	Bishop of Islas Canarias; 1551	Succeeded by Melchor Cano
