= Manuel Bernardo Morete Bodelón =

Spanish prelate of the Roman Catholic church

His Grace Manuel Bernardo Morete Bodelón
- Bishop of Astorga
- Church: Catholic
- Diocese: Roman Catholic Diocese of Astorga
- Predecessor: Guillermo Martínez Riaguas
- Successor: Leonardo Santander y Villavicencio

Orders
- Consecration: 21 November 1824 by Hipólito Antonio Sánchez Rangel de Fayas

Personal details
- Born: 20 August 1776 Magaz de Arriba, Spain
- Died: 2 January 1828 (aged 51) Astorga, Spain

Manuel Bernardo Morete Bodelón (20 August 1776 – 2 January 1828) was a Spanish prelate of the Catholic Church who served as bishop of Astorga. Previously he had served as Bishop of Canarias in the Canary Islands.

== Biography ==
He was born in Magaz de Arriba, Arganza Spain in 1776. Details of his ordination to the priesthood are not known, however, he was selected as Bishop of Canarias by Pope Leo XII in June 1824 and took up the role on 21 November that year. In January 1825 he was named Bishop of Astorga in mainland Spain an subsequently took up that position on 21 March 1825.

He died in office on 2 January 1826.

== Publications ==
Carta Pastoral, 1825, Madrid

== See also ==
- Roman Catholic Diocese of Canarias
- Roman Catholic Diocese of Astorga

Catholic Church titles
Preceded by Manuel Verdugo y Albiturría	Bishop of Canarias; 1824–1825	Succeeded by Fernando Cano Almirante, O.F.M.
Preceded by Guillermo Martínez Riaguas	Bishop of Astorga; 1825–1828	Succeeded by Leonardo Santander y Villavicencio
