= Miguel López de la Serna =

Spanish Roman Catholic prelate

Most Reverend Miguel López de la Serna
- Bishop of Islas Canarias
- Church: Catholic Church
- Diocese: Diocese of Islas Canarias
- In office: 1486–1490
- Predecessor: Juan de Frías

Personal details
- Died: 1490 Canary Islands, Spain

Miguel López de la Serna, O.F.M. (also Michele Lopez de la Sorra) (died 1490) was a Roman Catholic prelate who served as Bishop of Islas Canarias (1486–1490).

== Biography ==
Miguel López de la Serna was ordained a priest in the Order of Friars Minor. On 29 Mar 1486, he was appointed during the papacy of Pope Innocent VIII as Bishop of Islas Canarias. He served as Bishop of Islas Canarias until his death in 1490.

== External links and additional sources ==
- Cheney, David M. "Diocese of Islas Canarias". Catholic-Hierarchy.org. (for Chronology of Bishops)^{self-published}
- Chow, Gabriel. "Diocese of Islas Canarias {Canary Islands} (Spain)". GCatholic.org. (for Chronology of Bishops)^{self-published}

Catholic Church titles
Preceded by Juan de Frías	Bishop of Islas Canarias; 1486–1490	Succeeded by
