= Alonso Ruiz de Virués =

Spanish Roman Catholic prelate

Most Reverend Alonso Ruiz de Virués
- Bishop of Islas Canarias
- Church: Catholic Church
- Diocese: Diocese of Islas Canarias
- In office: 1538–1545
- Predecessor: Juan de Salamanca
- Successor: Antonio de la Cruz (bishop)

Personal details
- Born: 1480 Olmedo, Spain
- Died: 19 January 1545 (age 65) Telde, Spain

Alonso Ruiz de Virués, O.F.M. (died 1545) was a Roman Catholic prelate who served as Bishop of Islas Canarias (1538–1545).

== Biography ==
Alonso Ruiz de Virués was born in Olmedo, Spain 1480 and ordained a priest in the Order of Friars Minor. On 12 Aug 1538, he was appointed during the papacy of Pope Paul III as Bishop of Islas Canarias. He served as Bishop of Islas Canarias until his death on 19 January 1545.

== External links and additional sources ==
- Cheney, David M. "Diocese of Islas Canarias". Catholic-Hierarchy.org. (for Chronology of Bishops)^{self-published}
- Chow, Gabriel. "Diocese of Islas Canarias {Canary Islands} (Spain)". GCatholic.org. (for Chronology of Bishops)^{self-published}

Catholic Church titles
Preceded by Juan de Salamanca	Bishop of Islas Canarias; 1538–1545	Succeeded by Antonio de la Cruz (bishop)
