= Melchor Cano =

Spanish theologian

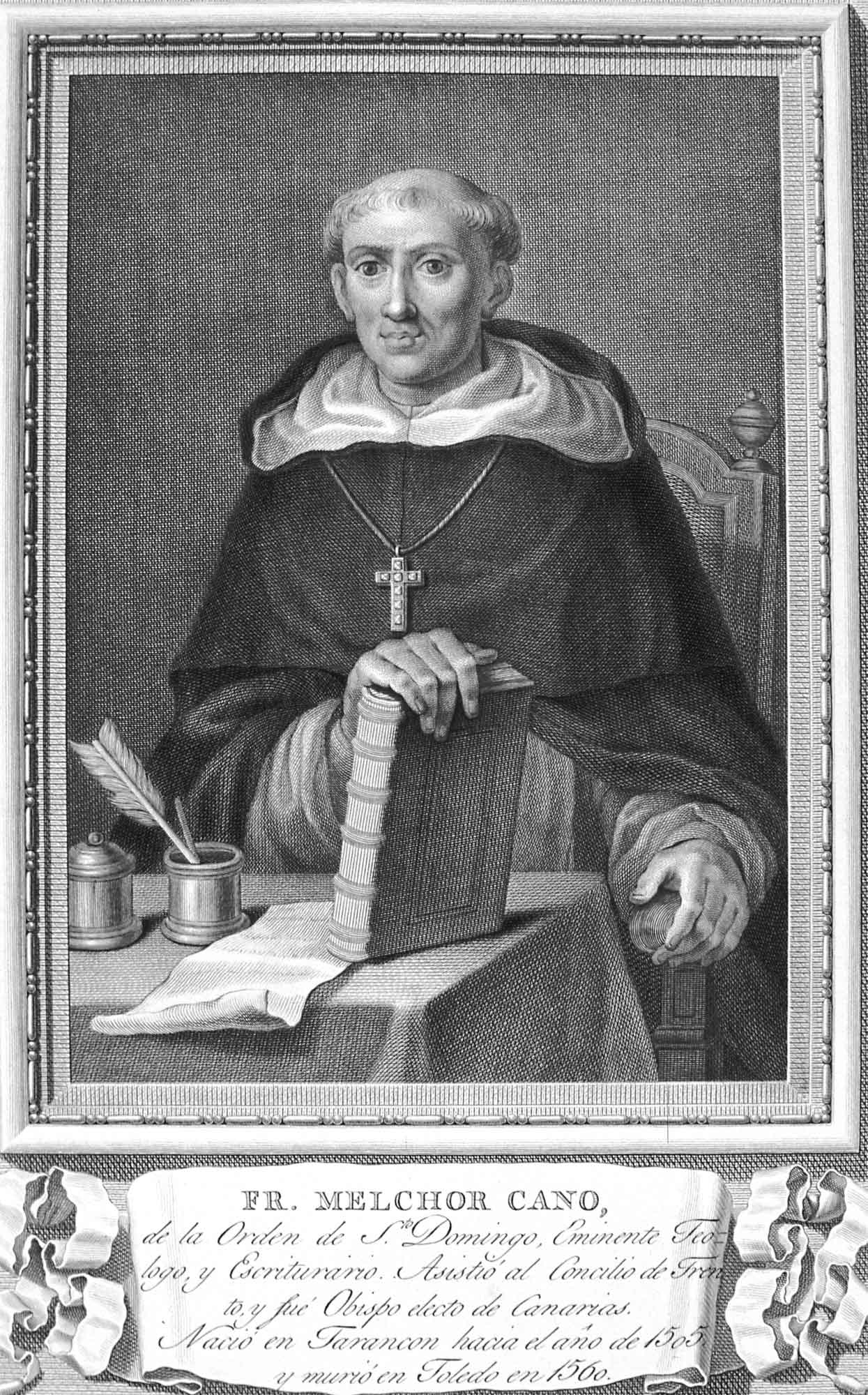
Melchor Cano.

Melchor Cano O.P. (1509? – 30 September 1560) was a Spanish Scholastic theologian. Cano's most important theological work was his posthumously published De locis theologicis (Salamanca, 1563), a major contribution to the New Scholasticism of the School of Salamanca.

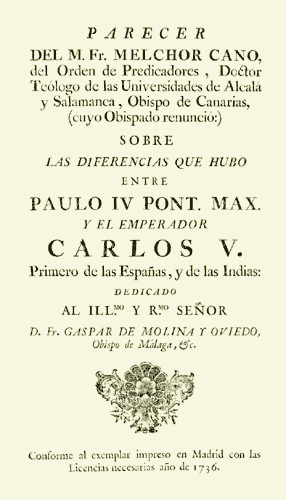
Parecer del M. fr. Melchor Cano dado al Señor Emperador Carlos V (1555) edition of 1736.

== Clerical life ==
Melchor Cano was born in Tarancón (New Castile); in 1523 he entered the Dominican order in Salamanca, where he was taught by Francisco de Vitoria. He taught at Valladolid (1534–43) and Alcalá (1543–6) before succeeding Vitoria as professor of theology at Salamanca. Cano was a man of deep learning and originality. His only rival was Bartolomé Carranza, also a Dominican and afterwards archbishop of Toledo. At the university the schools were divided between the partisans of the two professors; Cano pursued his rival with relentless virulence, and took part in the condemnation for heresy of his brother-friar. He attended the Council of Trent and participated in the debates on the eucharist and on penance (which dealt with the issue of indulgences). In 1552 Cano was appointed bishop of the Canary Islands at the behest of Jesuits who wanted him out of Spain because of his opposition to their Order; there was unease in Rome about the appointment, and the following year Cano renounced the see.

== Consultatio theologica ==
His personal influence with King Philip II of Spain soon brought about his recall, and he was made provincial of his order in Castile. In 1556 he wrote his famous Consultatio theologica, in which he advised the king to resist the temporal encroachments of the papacy and, as absolute monarch, to defend his rights by bringing about a radical change in the administration of ecclesiastical revenues, thus making Spain less dependent on Rome. With this in his mind Pope Paul IV styled him "a son of perdition." In 1557 Cano was elected Dominican provincial of Castile, but the Vatican declined to confirm the appointment; he was again elected in 1559, and after an initial refusal the Vatican acquiesced in the appointment.

== De Locis theologicis ==
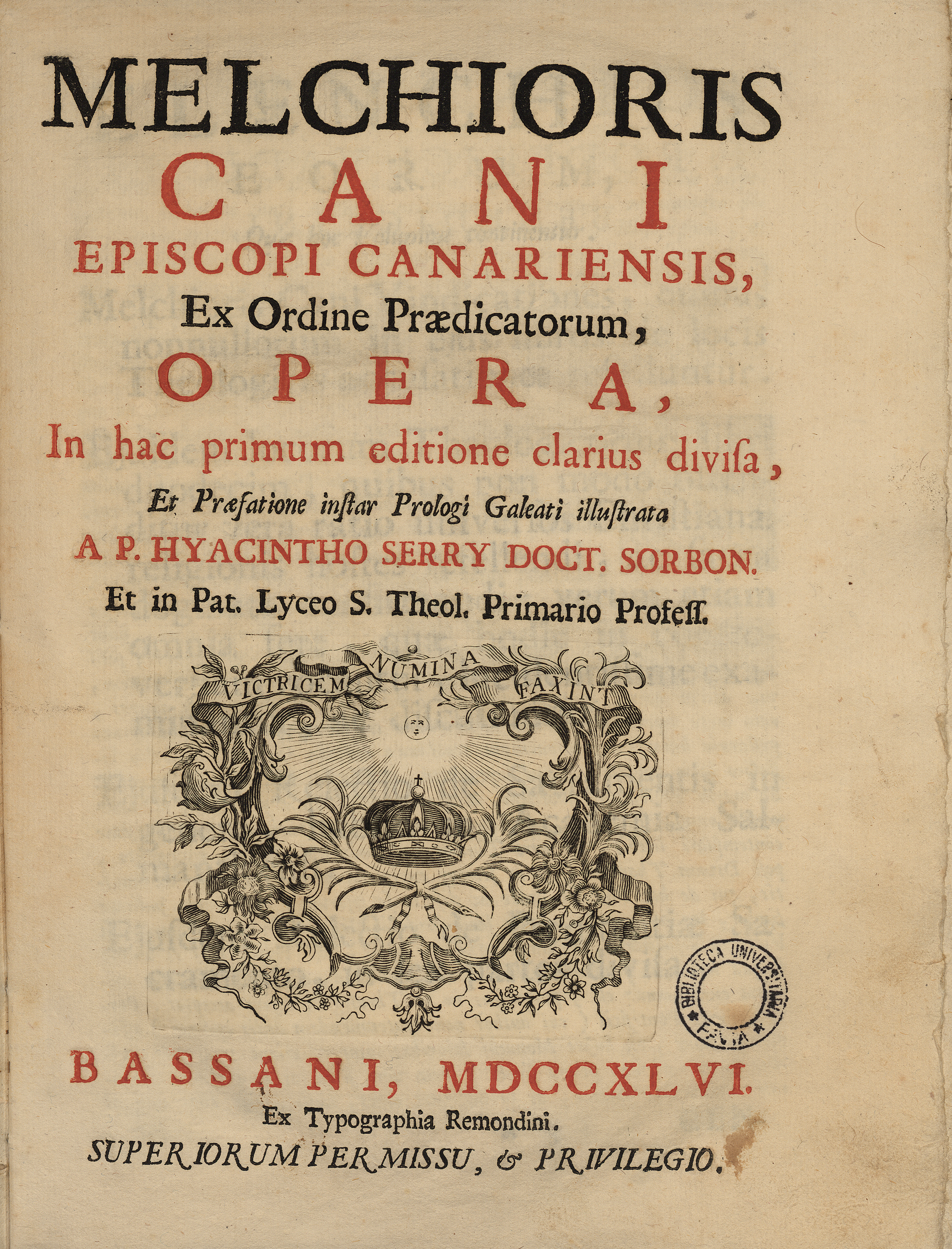
Opera, 1746

The reputation of Cano rests on a posthumous work, De Locis theologicis (Salamanca, 1562), unrivalled in its own line. In this, a genuine work of the Renaissance, Cano tried to free dogmatic theology from the vain subtleties of the schools; by clearing away the puerilities of the later scholastic theologians, to bring religion back to first principles; and, by giving rules, method, co-ordination and system, to build up a scientific treatment of theology. In discussing the credibility of sources, he was one of the first to inquire into the principles of the credibility of historical documents. He argues that if all serious historians agree about a fact, then we should believe it, even if it is unlikely. Otherwise "It would be as if the Mediterranean peoples were to deny the existence of the ocean ... or if, indeed, we should mock at him who speaks of elephants."

== Bibliography ==
- Text of the Salamanca edition is to be found in Migne I, 1837, 78, 908.
- Franklin, J. (2001). The Science of Conjecture: Evidence and Probability Before Pascal. Baltimore: Johns Hopkins University Press. pp. 192–3. ISBN 978-0801865695.

Catholic Church titles
Preceded by Francisco de la Cerda Córdoba	Bishop of Islas Canarias; 1552–1554	Succeeded by Diego Deza Tello
