= Manuel Verdugo y Albiturría =

Spanish prelate of the Roman Catholic church

His Grace Manuel Verdugo y Albiturría
- Diocese of Canarias
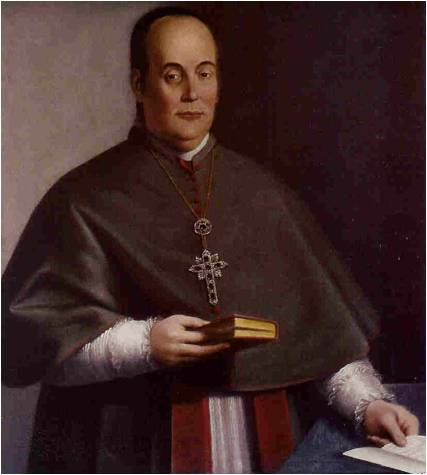
- Manuel Verdugo y Albiturría, Bishop of Canarias
- Church: Catholic
- Diocese: Diocese of Canarias
- Predecessor: Antonio Tavira Almazán
- Successor: Manuel Bernardo Morete Bodelón

Orders
- Consecration: 21 August 1796 by Francisco Antonio de Lorenzana

Personal details
- Born: 22 August 1749 Magaz de Arriba, Spain
- Died: 7 July 1818 (aged 68) Las Palmas, Spain

Manuel Verdugo y Albiturría (22 August 1749 – 7 July 1818) was a Spanish prelate of the Catholic Church who served as bishop of Diocese of Canarias.

== Biography ==
He was born in Las Palmas in the Canary Islands, Spain in 1749. Details of his ordination to the priesthood are not known, however, he was selected as Bishop of Canarias by Pope Pius VI in June 1796 and took up the role on 21 August of that year, becoming the first bishop born on the Canary Islands to serve in that role.

He died in office on 7 July 1818.

== See also ==
- Diocese of Canarias

Catholic Church titles
Preceded by Antonio Tavira Almazán	Bishop of Canarias; 1796–1818	Succeeded by Manuel Bernardo Morete Bodelón
