= Juan Rexach =

Spanish painter

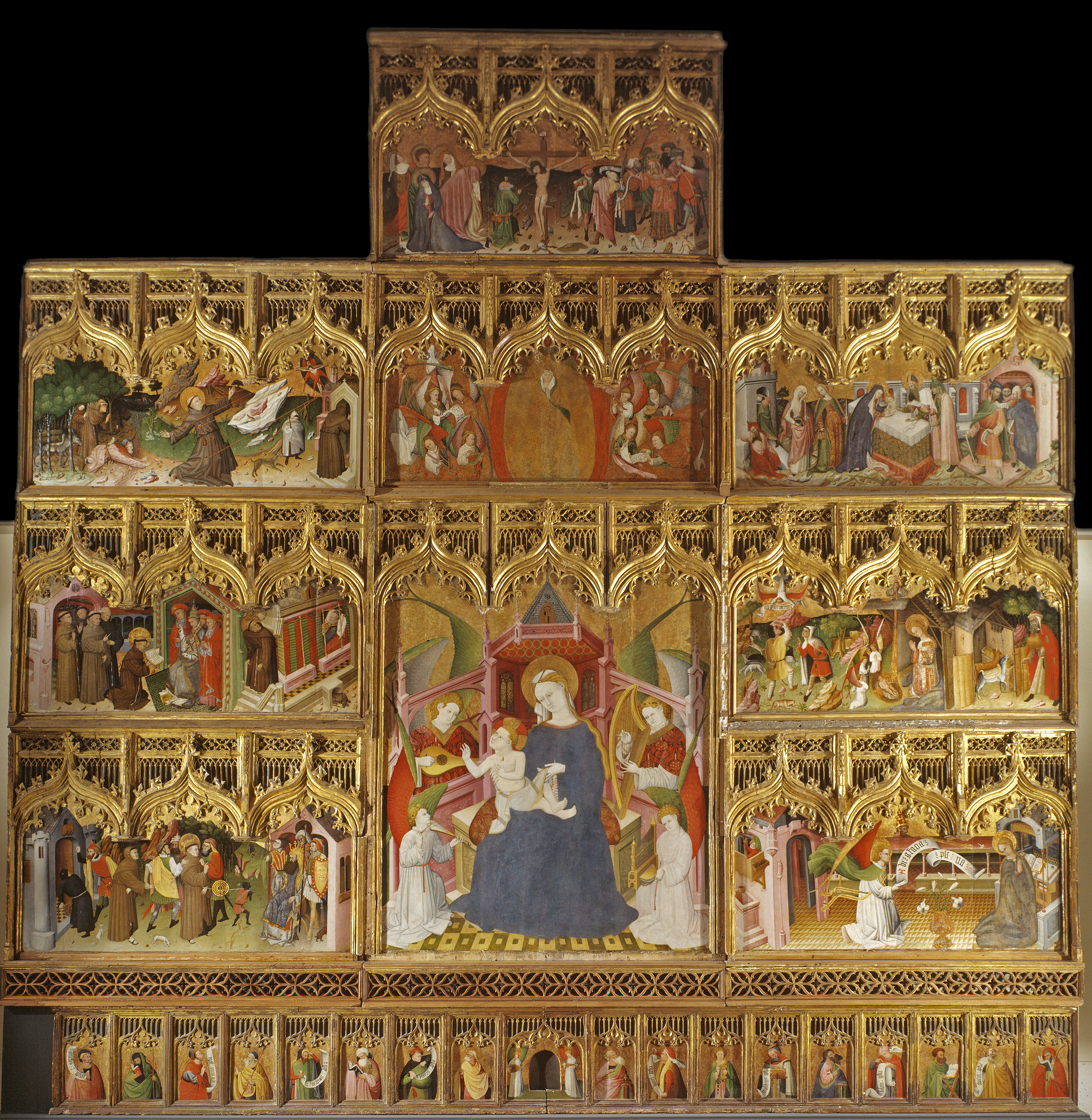
Life of the Virgin and Saint Francis by Nicolás Francés, altarpiece, now located in Museo del Prado

Juan Rexach, (fl. 1431-1482) was a Spanish painter and miniaturist. His date of birth is not known.

Most of his life is scarcely documented. He studied with Jacomart, in whose studio he worked, and after a period of time Rexach succeeded his master. He completed some altarpieces left incomplete by Jacomart, and worked with him on certain commissions, so sometimes attributions can be difficult. Rexach opted for large formats and monumental treatment of the figures.

Rexach was an eminent painter in Valencia during the 15th century. Although his works are markedly Spanish, they also reflect influences of other European artistic style, especially Flanders. His famous painting, The Crucifixion, resembles the work of Gerard David. The architecture shown in the painting is northern. His other famous work, Madonna and Child Enthroned, was in vogue to the point of becoming a motif in Valencian art of his time. These two paintings were part of a larger retable.

Among his works are the following altarpieces:

- The Santa Ursula, from Cubells, now in the Museu Nacional d'Art de Catalunya (National Art Museum of Catalonia). Signature appears at the feet of the saint
- The Epiphany, from the Augustinian convent in Rubielos de Mora, also in the Museu Nacional d'Art de Catalunya
- The San Martin, Segorbe Cathedral
- The Crucifixion and the Virgin enthroned with Angels, in the Norton Simon Museum
- The Annunciation, a diptych (118x110 cm each table) dated circa 1460, now in the Chilean National Museum of Fine Arts

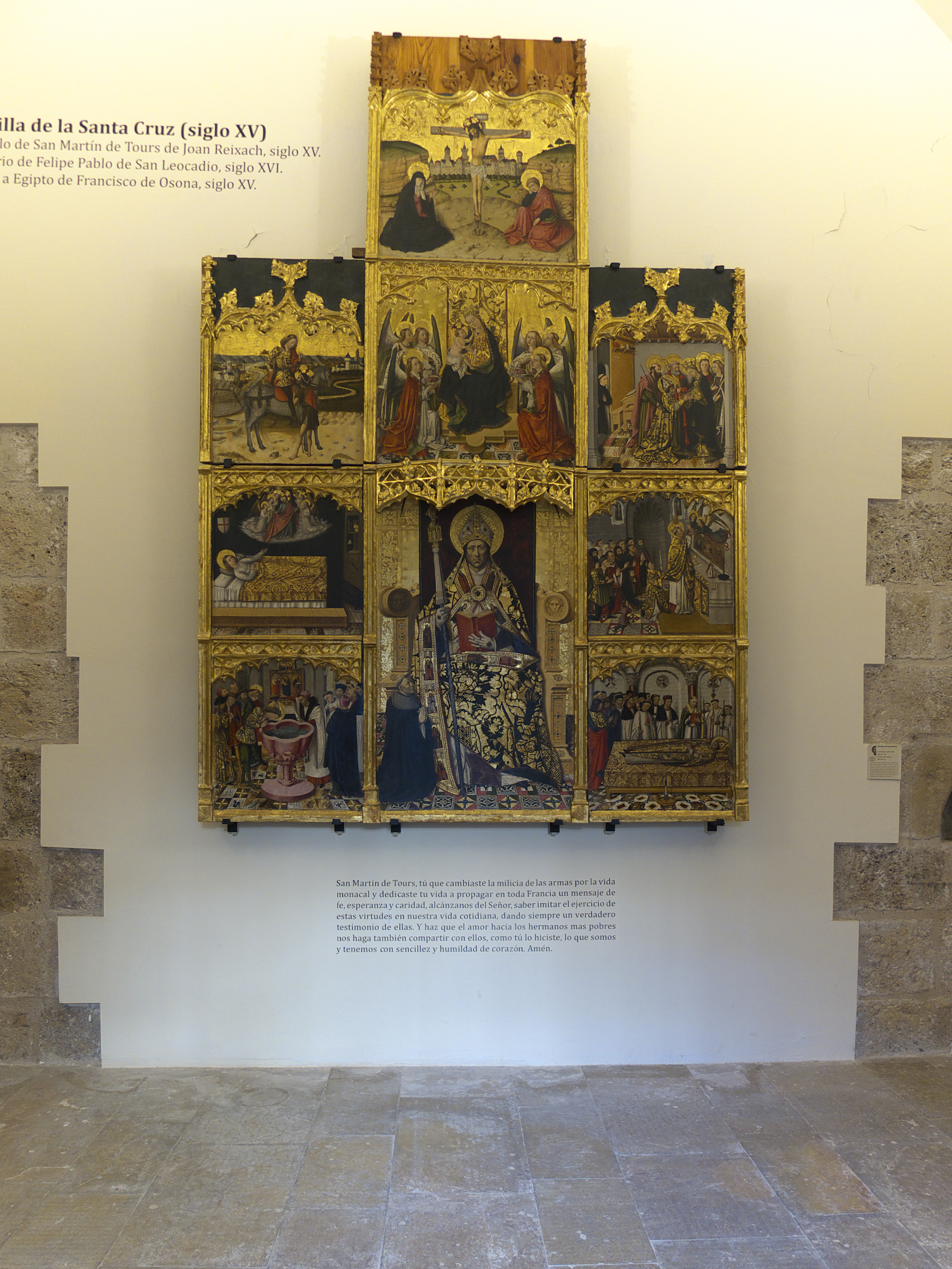
St. Martin of Tours, a retable by Juan Rexach, Segorbe Cathedral Museum
