= Adolfo Pérez y Muñoz =

Spanish Roman Catholic bishop

His Most Reverend Adolfo Pérez y Muñoz
- Bishop of Córdoba
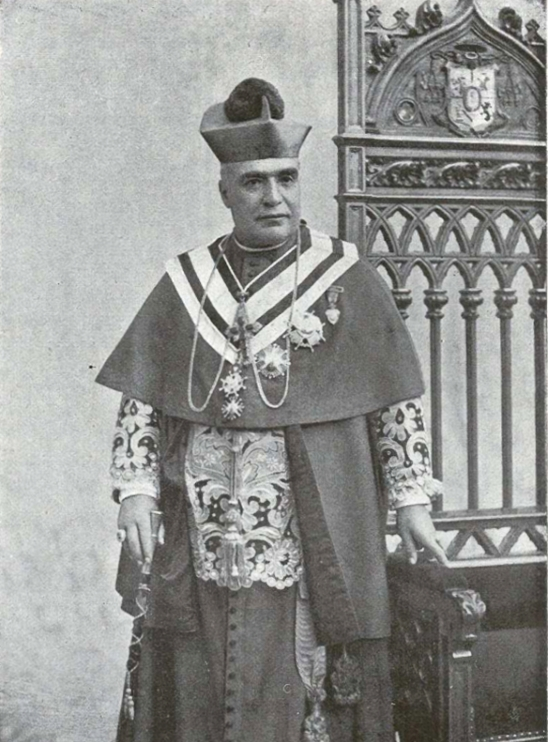
- Diocese: Córdoba
- Predecessor: Ramón Guillamet y Coma
- Successor: Albino González y Menéndez Reigada

Orders
- Ordination: 17 September 1888
- Consecration: 3 October 1909 by Enrique Almaraz y Santos

Personal details
- Denomination: Roman Catholic

Adolfo Pérez y Muñoz (18 July 1864 - 21 December 1945) was a Spanish prelate of the Roman Catholic church who served as Bishop of Córdoba.

== Biography ==
He was born in Cantabria, entered the seminary at a young age and was ordained a priest at the age of 24. On 29 April 1909 Pope Pius X named him Bishop of Canarias in the Canary Islands, he took up the position on 3 October that year. Four years later he was appointed Bishop of Badajoz on 18 July 1918, and he was assigned to Córdoba 11 July 1920.

== Death ==
He died on 21 December 1945 while serving as Bishop in Córdoba, Spain.

== See also ==
- Roman Catholic Diocese of Canarias
- Roman Catholic Archdiocese of Mérida-Badajoz
- Roman Catholic Diocese of Córdoba

Catholic Church titles
Preceded by José Cueto y Díez de la Maza	Bishop of Canarias; 1909-1913	Succeeded by Ángel Marquina y Corrales
Preceded by Félix Soto y Mancera	Bishop of Badajoz; 1913-1920	Succeeded by Ramón Pérez y Rodríguez
Preceded by Ramón Guillamet y Coma	Bishop of Córdoba; 1920-1945	Succeeded by Albino González y Menéndez Reigada
