= Antonio de la Cruz (bishop) =

Spanish Roman Catholic prelate

Most Reverend Antonio de la Cruz
- Bishop of Islas Canarias
- Church: Catholic Church
- Diocese: Diocese of Canarias
- In office: 1545–1550
- Predecessor: Alonso Ruiz de Virués
- Successor: Francisco de la Cerda Córdoba

Personal details
- Born: 1480 Burgos, Spain
- Died: 1550 (aged 69–70) Cádiz, Spain

Antonio de la Cruz, O.F.M. (1480–1550) was a Roman Catholic prelate who served as Bishop of Islas Canarias (1545–1550).

== Biography ==
Antonio de la Cruz was born in Burgos, Spain in 1480 and ordained a priest in the Order of Friars Minor. On 7 December 1545, he was appointed during the papacy of Pope Paul III as Bishop of Islas Canarias. On 4 January 1546, he was consecrated bishop. He served as Bishop of Islas Canarias until his death in 1550 in Cádiz.

== See also ==
- Roman Catholicism in Spain

== External links and additional sources ==
- Cheney, David M. "Diocese of Islas Canarias". Catholic-Hierarchy.org. (for Chronology of Bishops)^{self-published}
- Chow, Gabriel. "Diocese of Islas Canarias {Canary Islands} (Spain)". GCatholic.org. (for Chronology of Bishops)^{self-published}

Catholic Church titles
Preceded by Alonso Ruiz de Virués	Bishop of Islas Canarias; 1545–1550	Succeeded by Francisco de la Cerda Córdoba
