= Judas José Romo y Gamboa =

Spanish prelate of the Roman Catholic church (1779–1855)

His Eminence Judas José Romo y Gamboa
- Archbishop of Seville
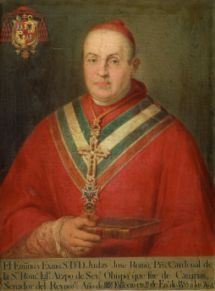
- Church: Catholic
- Archdiocese: Seville
- Predecessor: Francisco Javier de Cienfuegos y Jovellanos
- Successor: Manuel Joaquín Tarancón y Morón

Orders
- Consecration: 1 May 1834 by Pedro José de Fonte y Hernández Miravete
- Created cardinal: 30 September 1850 by Pope Pius IX

Personal details
- Born: 7 January 1779 Toledo, Spain
- Died: 11 January 1855 (aged 76) Seville, Spain
- Coat of arms

Judas José Romo y Gamboa (7 January 1779 – 11 January 1855) was a Spanish prelate of the Catholic Church who served as Cardinal Archbishop of Seville. Previously he had served as Bishop of Canarias in the Canary Islands.

== Biography ==
He was born in Toledo, Spain to Brigadier Francisco Romo y Gamboa (1746–1813) and Ramona Fernández Manrique (1750–1787), and was educated at the University of Huesca. Details of his ordination to the priesthood are not known, however, he was selected as Bishop of Canarias by Pope Gregory XVI in 1833 and took up the role on 1 May 1834. In September 1847 Pope Pius IX named him Archbishop of Seville a subsequently elevated him to Cardinal Priest on 30 September 1850.

He died on 11 January 1855 in Seville.

== See also ==
- Roman Catholic Diocese of Canarias
- Roman Catholic Archdiocese of Seville

Catholic Church titles
Preceded by Bernardo Martínez Carnero	Bishop of Canarias; 1834–1847	Succeeded by Buenaventura Codina y Augerolas
Preceded by Francisco Javier de Cienfuegos y Jovellanos	Archbishop of Seville; 1847–1855	Succeeded by Manuel Joaquín Tarancón y Morón
