= José Cueto y Díez de la Maza =

Spanish Roman Catholic bishop

Servant of God José Cueto y Díez de la Maza OP
- Bishop of Canarias
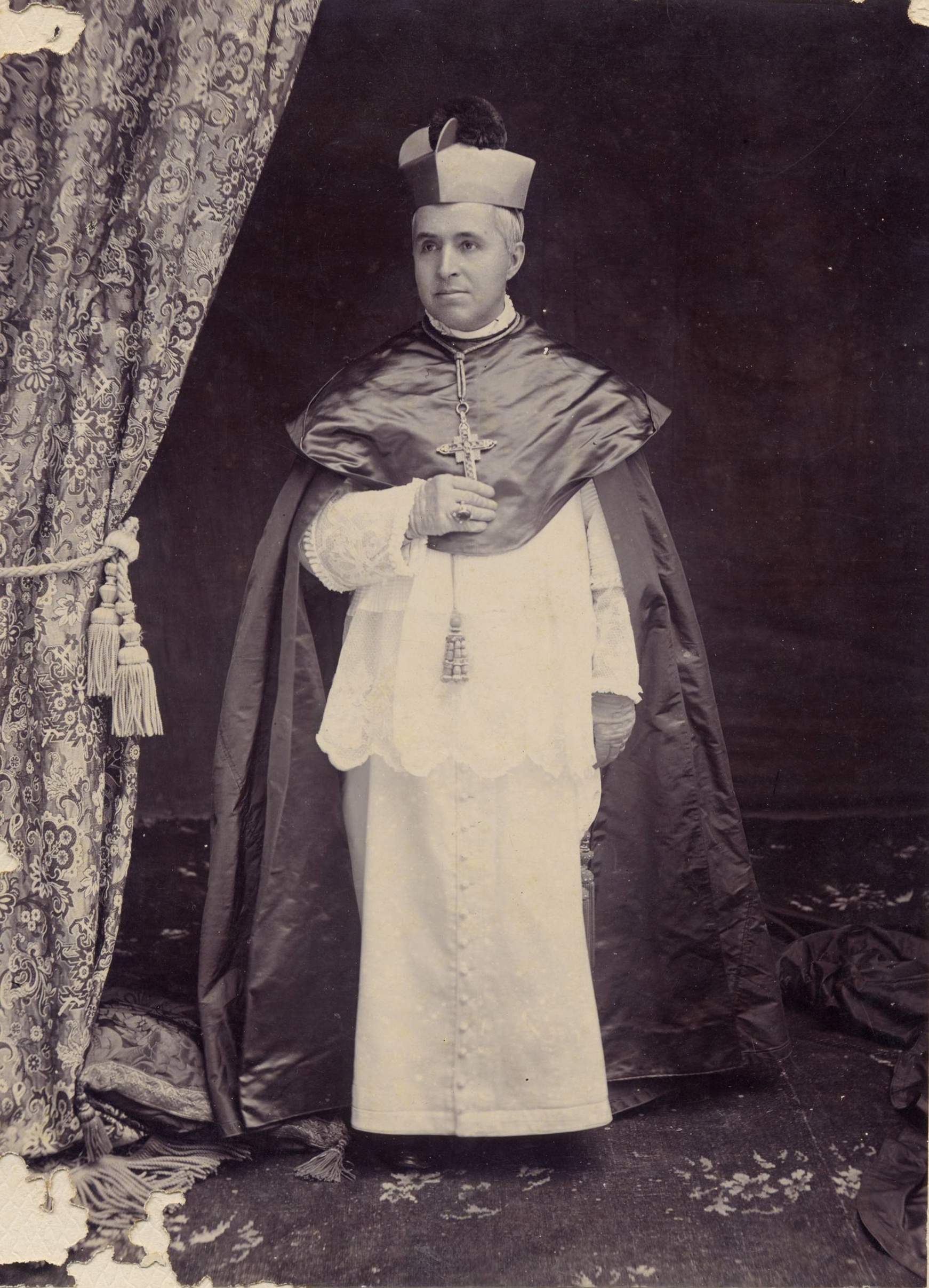
- Diocese: Canarias
- Predecessor: José Proceso Pozuelo y Herrero
- Successor: Adolfo Pérez y Muñoz

Orders
- Ordination: 1863
- Consecration: 27 September 1891 by Ramón Martínez y Vigil

Personal details
- Born: 4 November 1839 Yermo, Cantabria, Spain
- Died: 17 August 1908 (aged 68) Las Palmas, Islas Canarias, Spain
- Denomination: Roman Catholic

José Carlos Cueto y Díez de la Maza OP (4 November 1839 - 17 August 1908) was a Spanish prelate of the Roman Catholic Church who served as Bishop of Canarias.

== Biography ==
He was born in 1839 and ordained as a priest in the Order of Preachers in 1863. On 27 September 1891 Pope Leo XIII appointed him Bishop of Canarias, which serves three of Canary Islands (Gran Canaria, Lanzarote and Fuerteventura). In 1895 he founded the Dominican Congregation Missionaries of the Holy Family.

=== Death ===
He died in office on 17 August 1908.

== Beatification ==
His beatification process has been initiated in 2002 and the inquiry was closed on diocesan level in 2007.

== See also ==
- Diocese of Tenerife (the remaining Canary Islands)

Catholic Church titles
Preceded by José Proceso Pozuelo y Herrero	Bishop of Canarias; 1891-1908	Succeeded by Adolfo Pérez y Muñoz
