= Ángel Marquina y Corrales =

Spanish Roman Catholic bishop

His Most Reverend Ángel Marquina y Corrales
- Bishop of Guadix
- Archdiocese: Granada
- Diocese: Guadix
- Predecessor: Adolfo Pérez y Muñoz
- Successor: Miguel de los Santos Serra y Sucarrats

Orders
- Ordination: 4 June 1887
- Consecration: 7 December 1913 by Prudencio Melo y Alcalde

Personal details
- Denomination: Roman Catholic

Ángel Marquina y Corrales (8 October 1859 - 1 January 1928) was a Spanish prelate of the Roman Catholic church and Bishop of Gaudix.

== Biography ==
Marquina, the son of a farmer, studied at the seminary of San Jerónimo de Burgos and was ordained a priest on 4 June 1887. He was later rector of the seminary from 1888 until 1898. He was appointed bishop of Canarias (the part of the Canary Islands including Gran Canaria, Lanzarote and Fuertaventura) on 18 July 1913 by Pope Pius X. On 6 September 1922, Pope Pius XI appointed him to be Bishop of Gaudix.

== Death ==
He died on 1 January 1928 while serving as Bishop in Gaudix, Spain.

== See also ==
- Roman Catholic Diocese of Canarias
- Roman Catholic Diocese of Guadix

Catholic Church titles
| Preceded by Adolfo Pérez y Muñoz | Bishop of Canarias; 1913-1922 | Succeeded by Miguel de los Santos Serra y Sucarrats |
| Preceded by Timoteo Hernández y Mulas | Bishop of Gaudix; 1922-1928 | Succeeded by Manuel Medina y Olmos |
