= Juan de Salamanca =

Spanish Roman Catholic prelate

Most Reverend Juan de Salamanca
- Bishop of Islas Canarias
- Church: Catholic Church
- Diocese: Diocese of Islas Canarias
- In office: 1531–1538
- Predecessor: Pedro Fernández Manrique
- Successor: Alonso Ruiz de Virués

Personal details
- Died: 1538 Canary Islands, Spain

Juan de Salamanca Polanco, O.P. (Burgos, c. 1490- Canary Islands, 1538) was a Roman Catholic prelate who served as Bishop of Islas Canarias (1531–1538).

== Biography ==
Juan de Salamanca was ordained a priest in the Order of Preachers. On 6 Mar 1531, he was appointed during the papacy of Pope Clement VII as Bishop of Islas Canarias. He served as Bishop of Islas Canarias until his death in 1538.

== External links and additional sources ==
- Cheney, David M. "Diocese of Islas Canarias". Catholic-Hierarchy.org. (for Chronology of Bishops)^{self-published}
- Chow, Gabriel. "Diocese of Islas Canarias {Canary Islands} (Spain)". GCatholic.org. (for Chronology of Bishops)^{self-published}

Catholic Church titles
Preceded by Pedro Fernández Manrique	Bishop of Islas Canarias; 1531–1538	Succeeded by Alonso Ruiz de Virués
