= Bernardo Martínez Carnero =

Spanish Roman Catholic bishop

His Most Reverend Bernardo Martínez Carnero
- Bishop of Canarias
- Diocese: Bishop of Canarias
- Predecessor: Fernando Cano Almirante, OFM
- Successor: Judas José Romo y Gamboa

Orders
- Consecration: 21 May 1827 by Antonio Allué y Sesse

Personal details
- Denomination: Roman Catholic

Bernardo Martínez Carnero (2 February 1763 - 26 January 1833) was a Spanish prelate of the Roman Catholic church who served as Bishop of Canarias, a part of the Canary Islands consisting of Gran Canaria, Lanzarote and Fuertaventura.

He was born on 2 February 1763. Little is known of his early life or priesthood until he was named Bishop of Canarias on 21 May 1827 by Pope Leo XII.

He died on 26 January 1833 while still serving as Bishop.

== See also ==
- Roman Catholic Diocese of Canarias

Catholic Church titles
Preceded by Fernando Cano Almirante, OFM	Bishop of Canarias; 1827-1833	Succeeded by Judas José Romo y Gamboa
