= José Proceso Pozuelo y Herrero =

Spanish Roman Catholic bishop

His Most Reverend José Proceso Pozuelo y Herrero
- Bishop of Córdoba
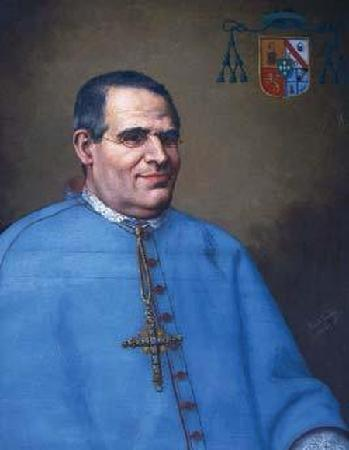
- Diocese: Córdoba
- Predecessor: Sebastián Herrero Espinosa de los Monteros
- Successor: Ramón Guillamet y Coma

Personal details
- Born: 2 July 1828
- Died: 23 March 1913 (aged 84)
- Denomination: Roman Catholic

Styles of José Proceso Pozuelo y Herrero
- Reference style: The Most Reverend
- Spoken style: Your Grace
- Religious style: Bishop

José Proceso Pozuelo y Herrero (Born 2 July 1828, died 23 March 1913) was a Spanish prelate of the Catholic Church, who served successively as apostolic administrator of Ceuta, bishop of Canarias, Segovia and Córdoba

== Biography ==
Born in Pozoblanco on July 2, 1828, he studied at the Córdoba Seminary, where he later became a professor. He was ordained as a priest in 1853.

He was appointed apostolic administrator of Ceuta and titular bishop of Antipatris in 1877 by Pope Pius IX, in 1879 he became Bishop of Canarias. Eleven years later, in 1890 he was appointed to the diocese of Segovia and in 1898 he was named bishop of Córdoba. He died in Córdoba on 23 March 1913.

Catholic Church titles
Preceded by	Titular Bishop of Antipatris; 1877 - 1879	Succeeded by Manuel Antonio Bandini
Preceded by José María Urquinaona y Bidot	Bishop of Canarias; 1879 - 1890	Succeeded by José Cueto y Díez de la Maza
Preceded by Antonio García y Fernández	Bishop of Segovia; 1890 - 1898	Succeeded by José Ramón Quesada y Gascón
Preceded by Sebastián Herrero Espinosa de los Monteros	Bishop of Córdoba; 1898 - 1913	Succeeded by Ramón Guillamet y Coma
