= Juan de Frías =

Spanish Roman Catholic prelate

Most Reverend Juan de Frías
- Bishop of Rubicón
- Church: Catholic Church
- Diocese: Diocese of Rubicón
- In office: 1474–1485
- Successor: Miguel López de la Serna

Personal details
- Died: 1485

Juan de Frías (died 1485) was a Roman Catholic prelate who served as Bishop of Rubicón (1474–1485).

== Biography ==
He was appointed during the papacy of Pope Sixtus IV, and held the position until his death in 1485.

== External links and additional sources ==
- Cheney, David M. "Diocese of Islas Canarias". Catholic-Hierarchy.org. (for Chronology of Bishops)^{self-published}
- Chow, Gabriel. "Diocese of Islas Canarias {Canary Islands} (Spain)". GCatholic.org. (for Chronology of Bishops)^{self-published}

Catholic Church titles
Preceded by	Bishop of Rubicón; 1474–1485	Succeeded by Miguel López de la Serna
