= Ramón Echarren Istúriz =

Spanish bishop

Ramón Echarren Istúriz (13 November 1929 – 25 August 2014) was a Roman Catholic bishop.

Ordained to the priesthood in 1958, Echarren Istúriz was appointed titular bishop of 'Diano' and auxiliary bishop of the Roman Catholic Archdiocese of Madrid, Spain, in 1969. In 1978, he was appointed bishop of the Roman Catholic Diocese of Canarias and retired in 2005.
