= Las Palmas Cathedral =

Catholic church in the Canary Islands

Coordinates: 28°06′03″N 15°24′53″W

Las Palmas Cathedral Catedral de Canarias
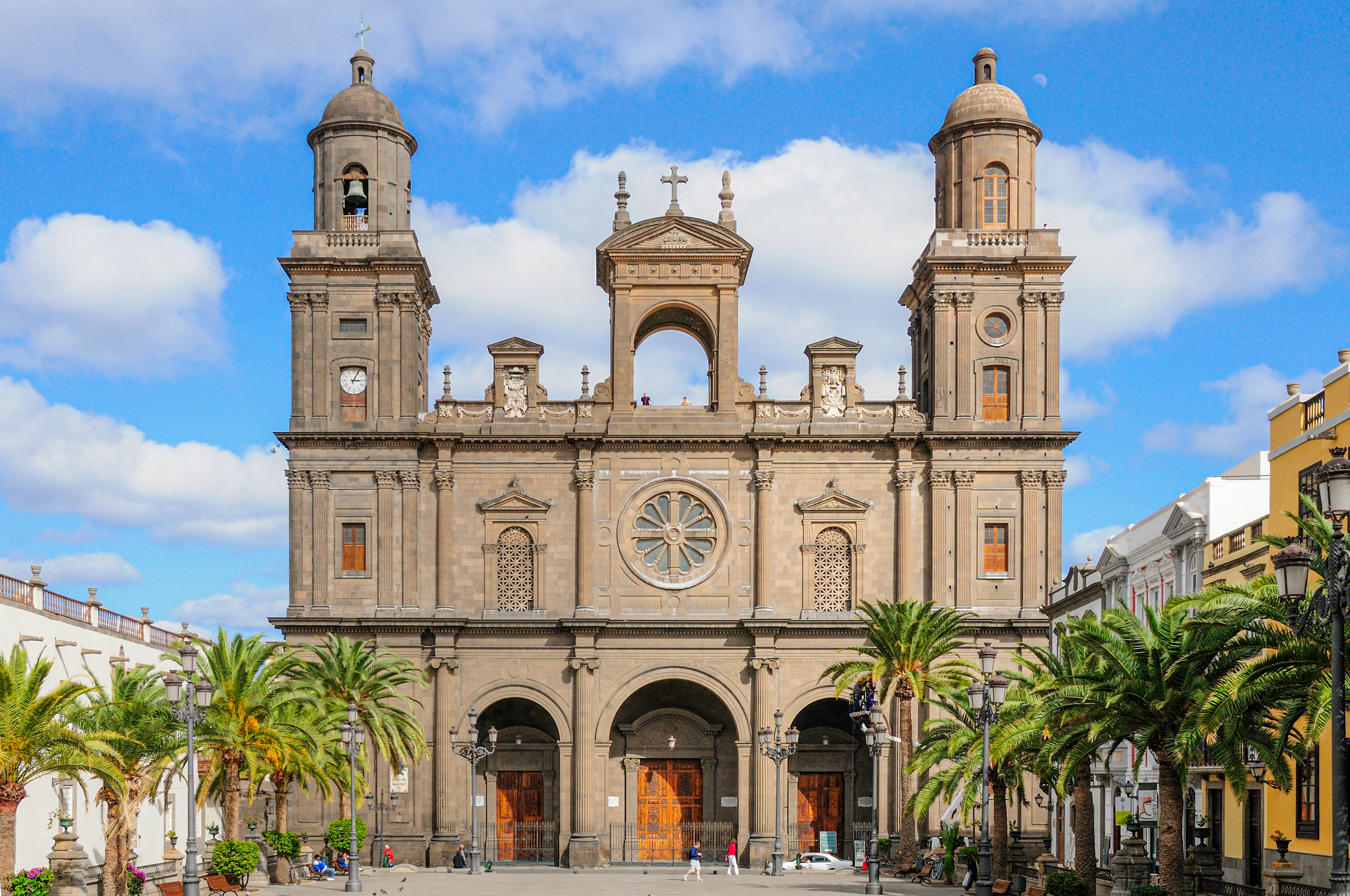
- Cathedral of Santa Ana.

Religion
- Affiliation: Roman Catholic Church
- Ecclesiastical or organizational status: Cathedral
- Leadership: Nicolás Monche (Deán)

Location
- Location: Las Palmas, Spain
- Interactive map of Las Palmas Cathedral; Catedral de Canarias

Architecture
- Type: church
- Style: Gothic (Pointed), Corinthian, Moorish, Romanesque
- General contractor: Siglo XVI

The Cathedral of Santa Ana (Holy Cathedral-Basilica of Canary or Cathedral of Las Palmas de Gran Canaria) is a Roman Catholic church located in Las Palmas, Canary Islands. The cathedral is the see of the Roman Catholic Diocese of Canarias. It is situated within the Vegueta neighborhood, next to the Plaza Mayor of Santa Ana.

The feast of the cathedral's dedication is celebrated every November 26. The structure is considered the most important monument of Canarian religious architecture.

== History ==
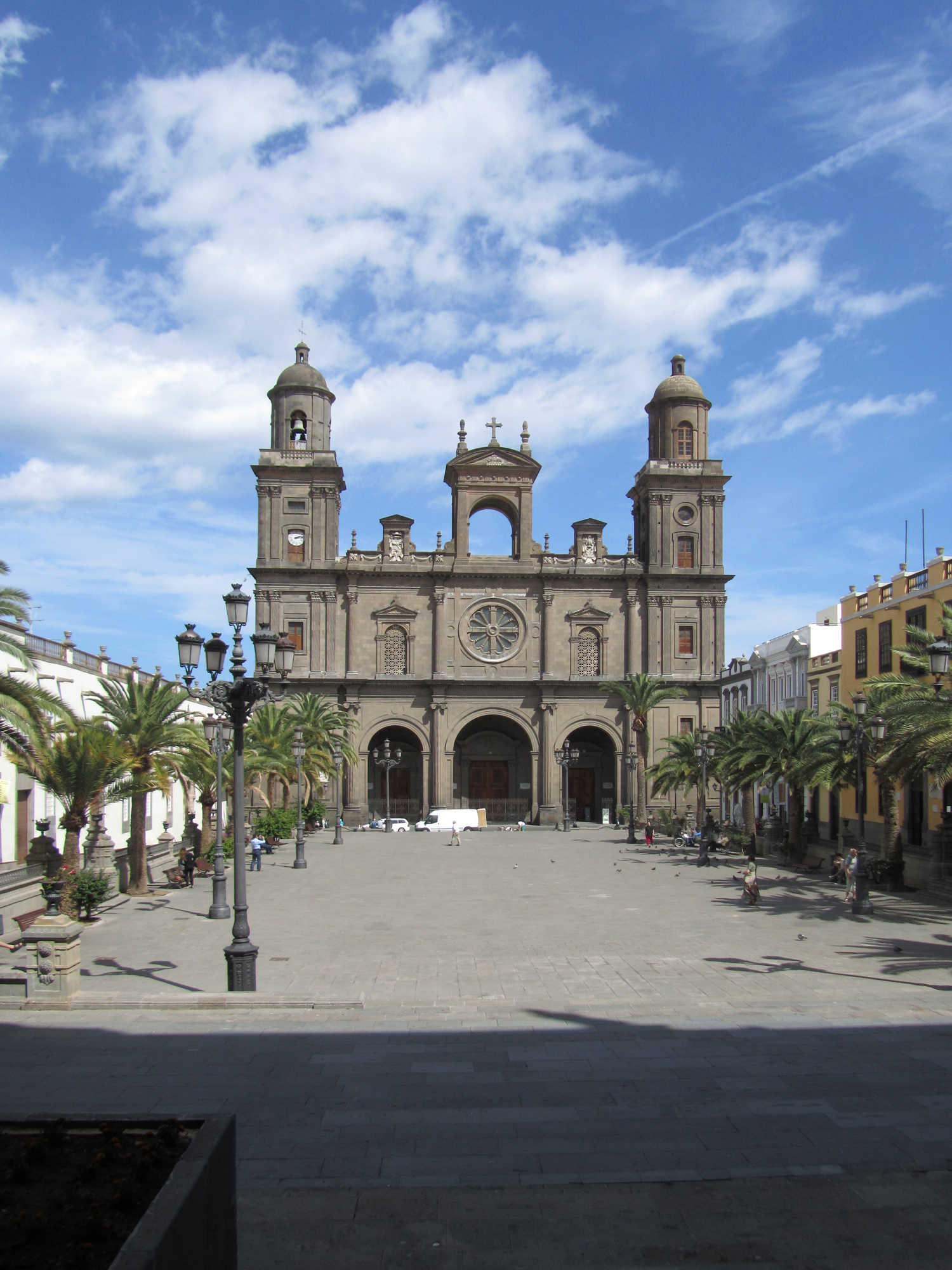
Vista de catedral de Canàries.

The present church was commenced in 1500, in the episcopate of Fr. Diego de Muros (d. 1524), dean of Santiago. He was third Bishop of Las Palmas. The architect was Don Diego Montaude. The design is credited to him, though he was succeeded by Juan de Palacio. The structure was finished, and the first offices celebrated, on the eve of Corpus Christi, 1570, in the time of the fourteenth Bishop, Fr. Juan de Alzolares. The eighteenth century saw the reconstruction and refurbishment of the cathedral after the Bishop, controlling a large tithe surplus, decided to commence work, overseen by Dean D. Geronimo Roos. The architect of the existing cathedral was Don Diego Nicolas Eduardo. Eduardo's plans were submitted to the St Ferdinand Academy of Madrid, who retained the original drawings, and returned copies for the commencement of the work itself.

Las Palmas Cathedral was the only cathedral in the Canary Islands until 1819, when it was founded the Roman Catholic Diocese of San Cristóbal de La Laguna based in the La Laguna Cathedral, with jurisdiction to the islands of the province of Santa Cruz de Tenerife.

== Architecture and fittings ==
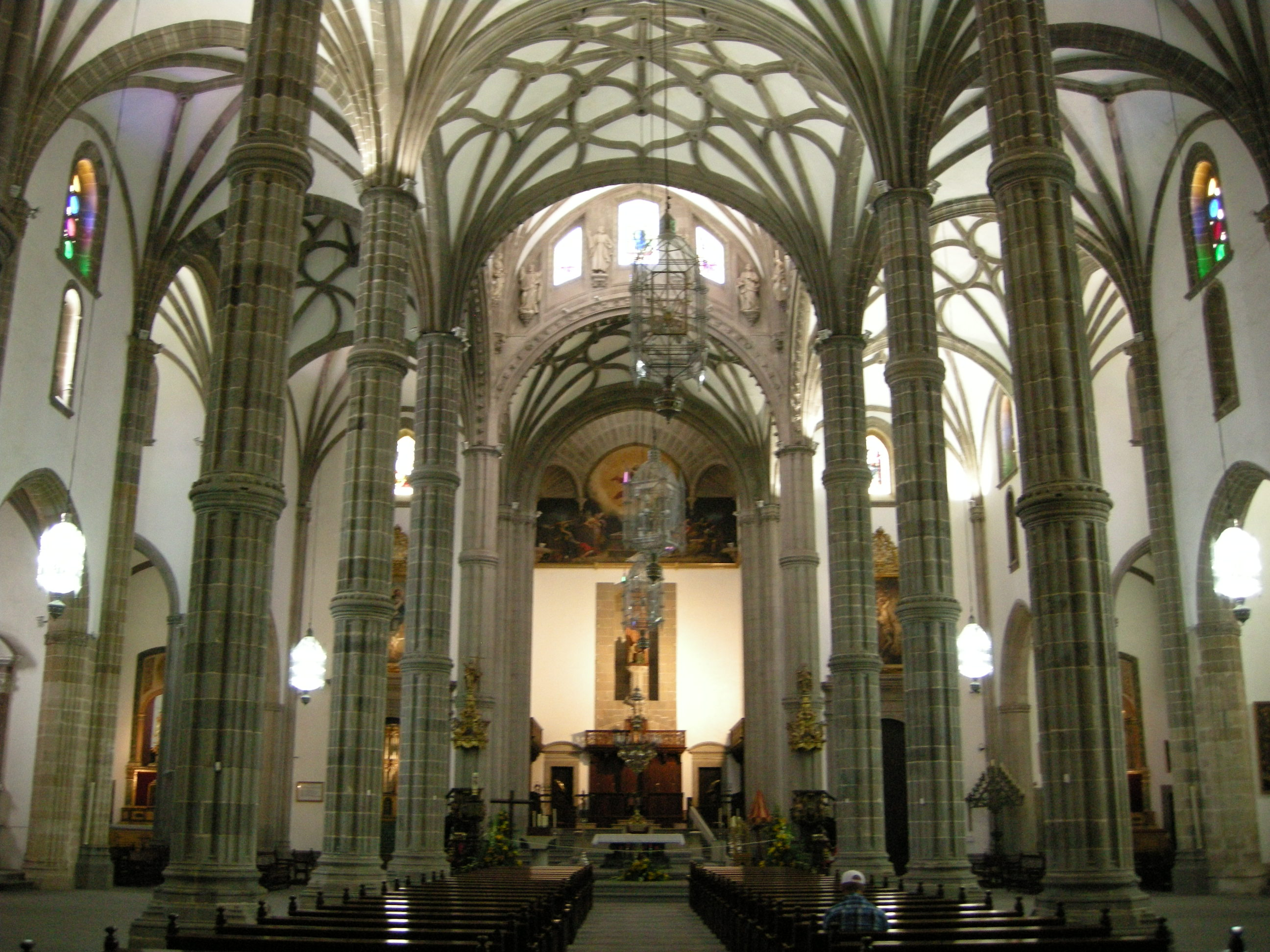
Interior view, demonstrating the piers as imitation palm trees.

The cathedral was designed in the Gothic Pointed architectural style. The present structure consists of a nave with double aisles, pseudo-transepts with eastern aisles, and a sanctuary. The nave and aisles are of four bays westward of the cross. The primary aisles are carried to the same height as the nave. The secondary aisles are low, and used for chapels. The wall between the two aisles carries a clerestory. The piers are worked in imitation of palm-trees. On a bold square base, 5 square feet (0.46 m^{2}), is imposed an octagon. On the octagon, there is a circle of deeply cut classicizing mouldings from which rise columns circular in plan. These columns are finely moulded; four bold circular rolls at the cardinal sides; between each are three fluted members. The whole effect combines the Corinthian and Pointed. These columns are banded twice with a very rich and effective moulding, combining a cable, with a row of ball-flowers above it; below, a deeply cut chevron, pointing downwards. These shafts have no capitals; they run up into a horizontal fillet, from which spring plain vaulting ribs, which flow from the shafts as palm-branches do from the trunk. The vaulting is good sexpartite. Between the two aisles are pure pointed arches. The responds to the circular piers,—that is, the responds on the wall between the aisles, into which the vaulting of the primary aisles falls,—are half shafts of ordinary Pointed work, without fillets, and of five foliaged heads; the caps of the aisle vaulting are also foliaged. The western responds to the circular shafts are also ordinary Pointed. It is plain, therefore, that the architect could only trust to his palmary development in the isolated shafts. This is the old work: the church being left unfinished in the sixteenth century.

Eastward of the four bays is Eduardo's eighteenth century work; it consists of a cross, with transepts, or rather pseudo-transepts, carried up throughout to the height of the nave and first aisles, but not extending laterally beyond the secondary aisles. Throughout the arches are scarcely pointed, as nearly as possible forming a semi-circle. The square of the cross is like the old work, except that the soffits of the four sustaining arches are enriched with featherings of shell-work, and above these is a deeply sunk hollow, enriched with ornaments. Above the arches rises a second pointed arch, sustaining a vaulted ciborium, entirely classical on the exterior, but pointed within. The space between the two arches is pierced with three windows; between each window is a statue. The transepts have eastward aisles, the piers of all which are exactly the same palm-trees as in the old work. The sanctuary has one bay more, without aisles, to itself, making in all seven bays to the nave, cross, and sanctuary, and six to the rest of the church. As is frequently the case in Spain, a mass of sacristy and the "panteon" are attached to the east end, which has therefore no constructive architectural feature. The dimensions of the church from the west are as follows:—four bays, each 23 feet (7.0 m) long; three piers, each 5 feet (1.5 m) in the square; two piers for the cross, each 5 feet (1.5 m) in the square; the cross, 30 feet (9.1 m); the aisle of the cross, 25 feet (7.6 m); the sanctuary, 25 feet (7.6 m); equal to 197 feet (60 m), total length. The nave is 36 feet (11 m) wide, and the aisles are each 27 feet (8.2 m); equal to 144 feet (44 m) total width.

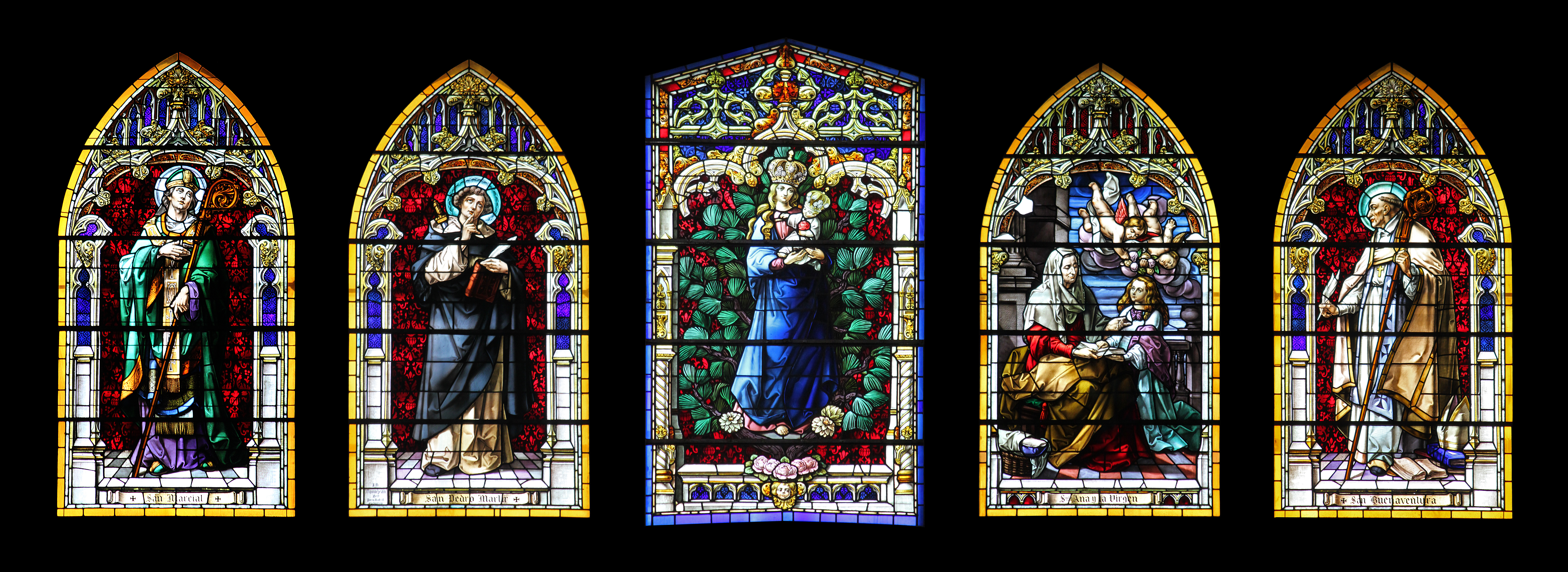
The cathedral's windows.

The second and third bays from the west are filled, or rather walled up, with a vile classical coro. The aisle-windows are broad single-lights, and pointed. Many of them, however, are classicized internally, as the secondary aisles have been tampered with. Several are walled off for chapels, and in the two western bays of the north aisle the vaulting is plaistered over; and in one of the bays of the south aisle, the old piers have been cut away, and Corinthian shafts have been stuck onto the walls. There are two ambons against the easternmost piers of the cross.

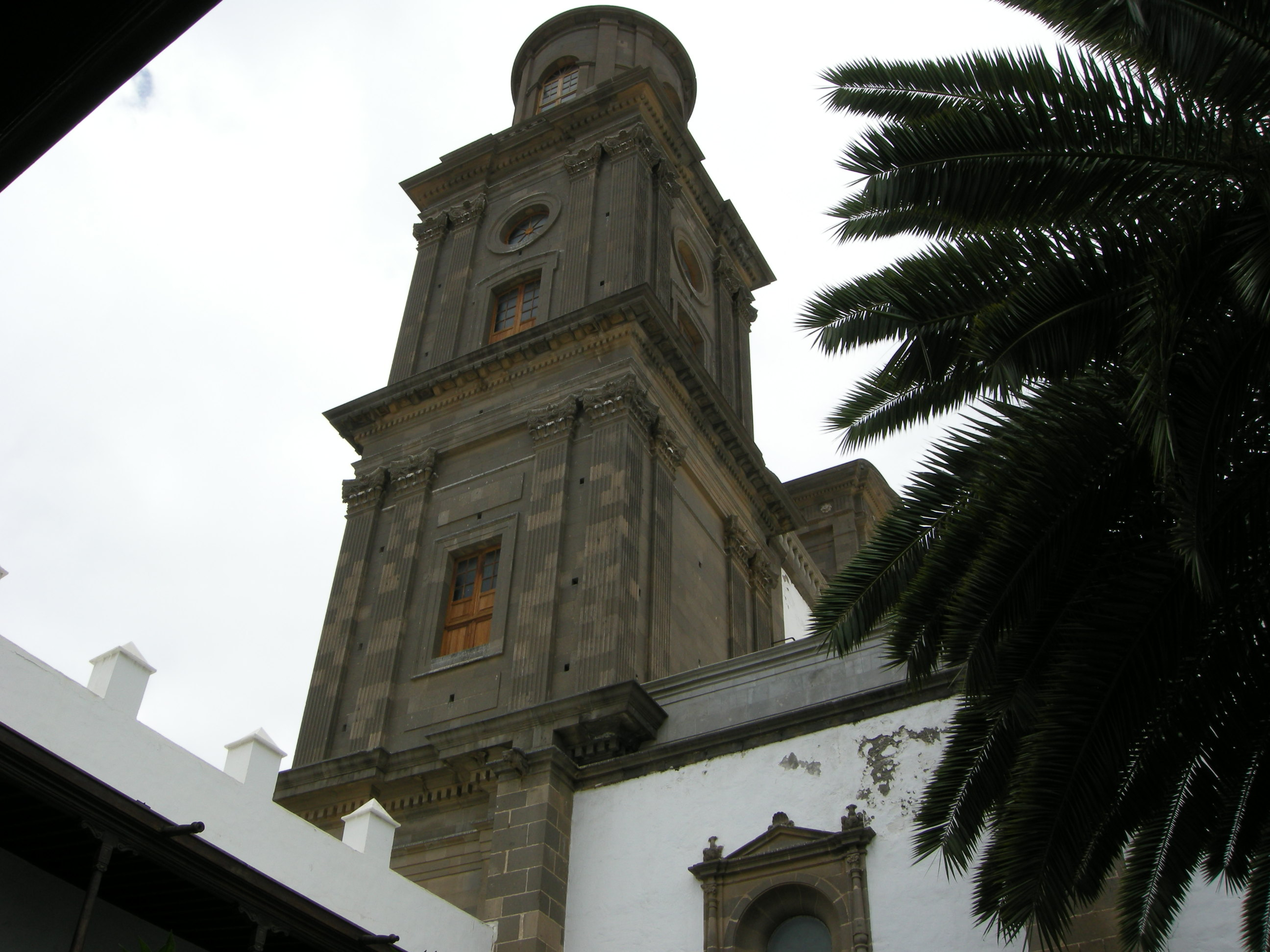
One of the campaniles.

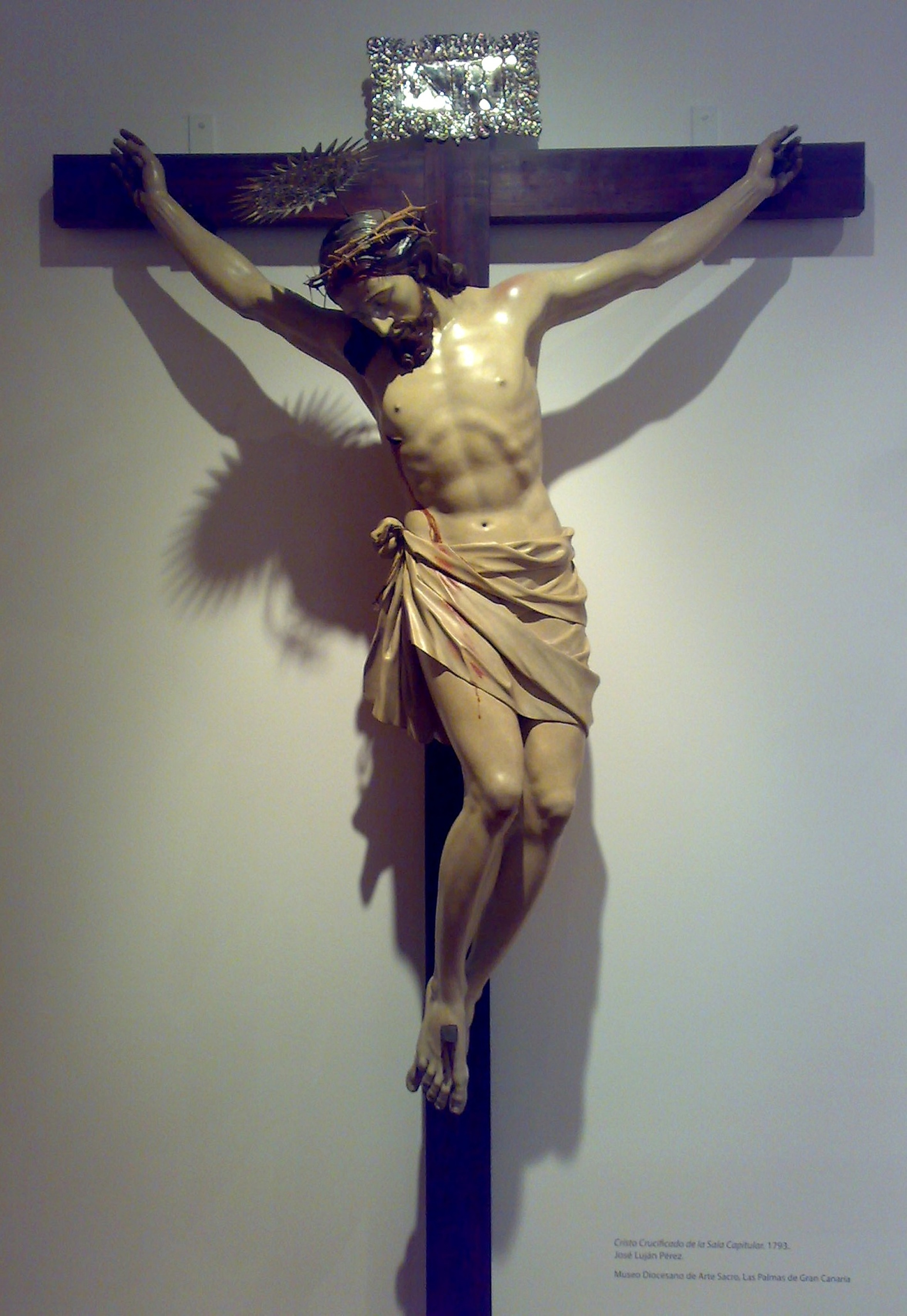
Crucified by José Luján Pérez, 1793, located in the Sala Capitular.

Video on Luján Pérez masterpiece.

The exterior was intended to be entirely cased by Eduardo, and reduced to a so-called classical uniformity with the new works, which, though Pointed both in feeling and detail internally, are entirely classical on the exterior. His object was to fuse the whole cathedral, with its vast accessories of sacristies into a complete design. Only the eastern part is finished, in which the sacristy has a somewhat grand, though false, apsidal look, with very lofty columns and recesses; the northern and southern fronts of the transepts were to have been masked by huge, soaring, and deep portals, and the western facade was to have been resolved into a Corinthian arcade, with flanking campaniles. Of these latter only one is executed. The arcade is carried up to the architrave; but the second story has not been built. This new work was set forward a few feet, so that the old western front is partly discoverable. It consisted of a centre gable for the nave, flanked by two octagonal Italian Romanesque campaniles. The primary aisles again are gabled; but it is impossible to say whether the secondary aisles were gabled, or again terminated westward by turrets. Whatever was their western finish, it is now embedded in the modern work. The Romanesque campaniles are similar to the ones found in the village of Teror, in an old octagonal Italian Romanesque tower of the same date. This exactly reproduces the flanking campaniles of the cathedral, and was probably by the same architect. It rises simply from the ground, and consists of six equal stages; the mouldings are good and divided, and the alternate faces of the top stage are pierced for the bells with a Pisan-looking arcade. It has a pyramidal, and very Norman-looking, capping. Externally, the window-arches—there is one, of course, in each bay of the aisles—are moulded with a single bold roll imposed upon a shaft, with a good base and capital. The bases are some moulded, and some run into a string, enriched with the ball ornament. The buttresses have been cased and modernized; the old gurgoyles remain. The buttresses are joined to the clerestory walls by flying buttresses, of which the outline of the segmental arches remain. The clerestory windows are plain pointed single lights, -with mouldings of three orders; the transept windows the same. Below each clerestory window is a single, recessed, narrow niche, or blank window, in the place of a triforium. There is a very pretty rose window in the western gable of the nave. The rest of the exterior is classicized;; the cimborium, or dome over the cross, is very mean; its curtailment was another of the poor architect's death-blows; and the rest consists of the usual vases, flower-wreaths, knobs, pots and pans, and spikes, and scent bottles of so-called Italian art. Eduardo's elevation is still preserved; but inquiries were made in vain for any memorial drawing of the church before the eighteenth century. In the westernmost chapel of the south aisle is the gigantic St.Christopher, the unfailing accompaniment of so many Spanish churches; here is also a door leading to a pretty semi-Moorish wooden cloister, somewhat too domestic and patio-like in effect; above this are the library and chapter-house, common-place Italian rooms. The sacristy has a very remarkable stone floor, 40 square feet (3.7 m^{2}), which is cunningly jointed and dovetailed; how it is supported without piers, or girders, for vaulting, the under surface being entirely horizontal, is a crux to the Canarians and others. The natives always point this floor out as the triumph of Eduardo's genius. The plate and vestments are rich hut late. A pax of Italian enamel is worth attention; and in the sacrarium, capilla mayor, is suspended a lamp of Genoese work—the offering of Bishop Ximenes, (1005–1690). Both the altar and credence have frontals of beaten silver; on the latter, which is at the south side of the altar, are three large salvers arranged, heraldically speaking. The gigantic paschal candle stands on the north side of the altar is about 15 feet (4.6 m). The sacrarium is lined throughout with crimson velvet, canopied into a baldachin over the high altar. The clerestory windows, and those of the cimborium, are basely filled with circular patches of plain coloured glass.

== Panoramas ==
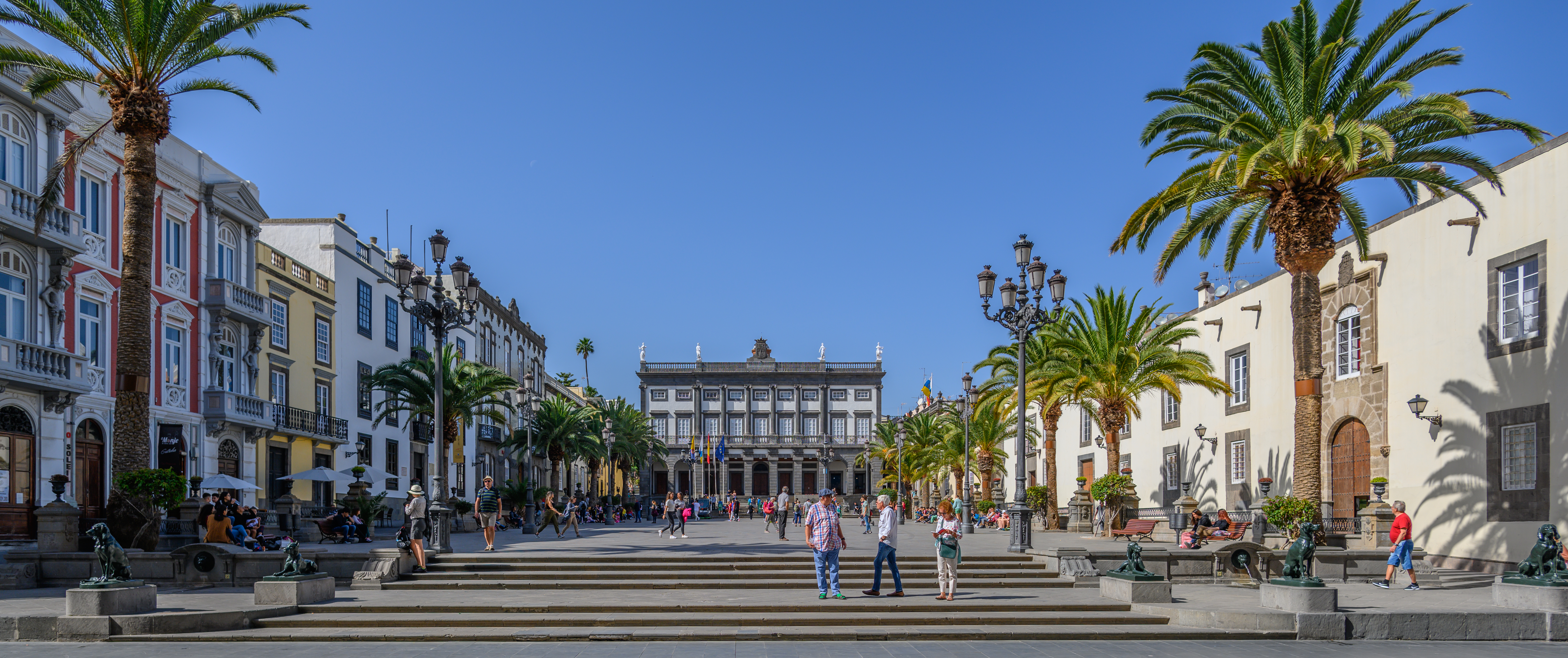
Santa Ana Plaza in front of Santa Ana Cathedral, February 2019
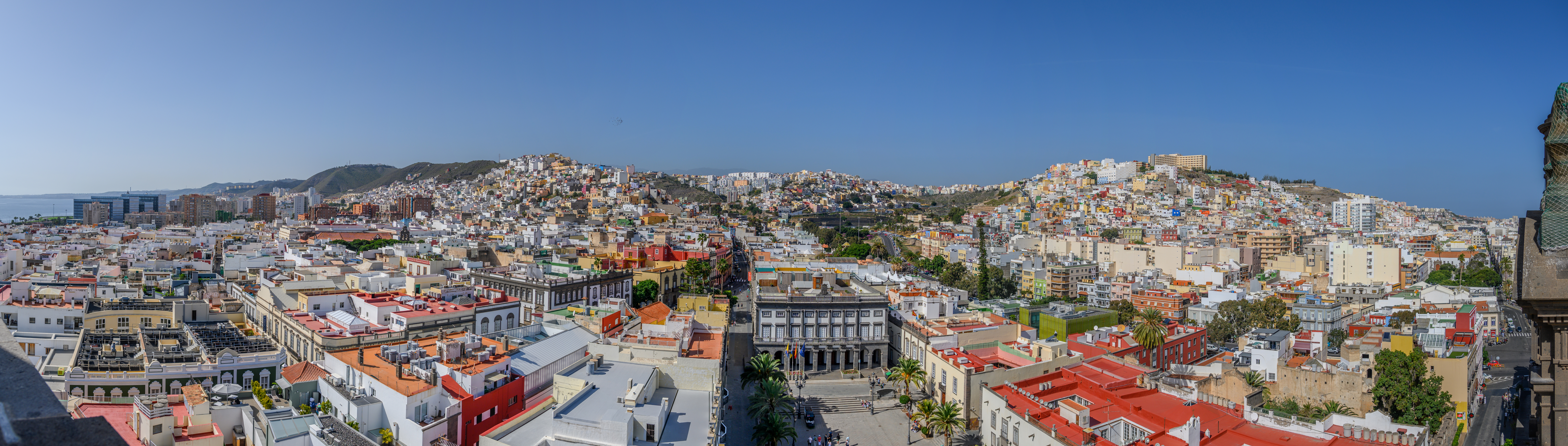
View looking west from atop Santa Ana Cathedral, February 2019
