= Diocese of Segorbe-Castellón =

Spanish diocese of the Catholic Church

Diocese of Segorbe-Castellón Dioecesis Segobricensis-Castillionensis Diócesis de Segorbe-Castellón (es) Diòcesi de Sogorb-Castelló (val)

Catholic

Location
- Country: Spain
- Ecclesiastical province: Valencia
- Metropolitan: Valencia
- Coordinates: 39.8523°N 0.4883°W

Information
- Denomination: Catholic
- Sui iuris church: Latin Church
- Rite: Roman Rite
- Cathedral: Segorbe Cathedral
- Co-cathedral: Castelló Cathedral

Current leadership
- Pope: Leo XIV
- Bishop: Casimiro López Llorente
- Metropolitan Archbishop: Antonio Cañizares Llovera

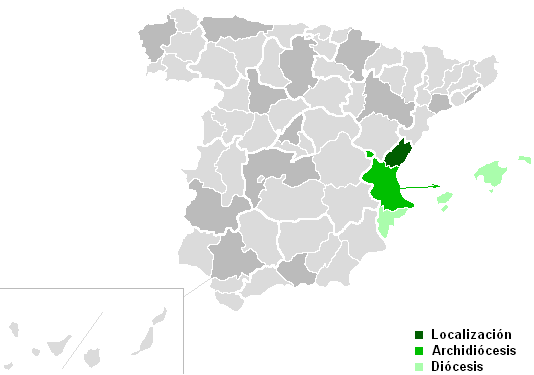
Map of the Roman Catholic Diocese of Segorbe-Castellón (dark green)

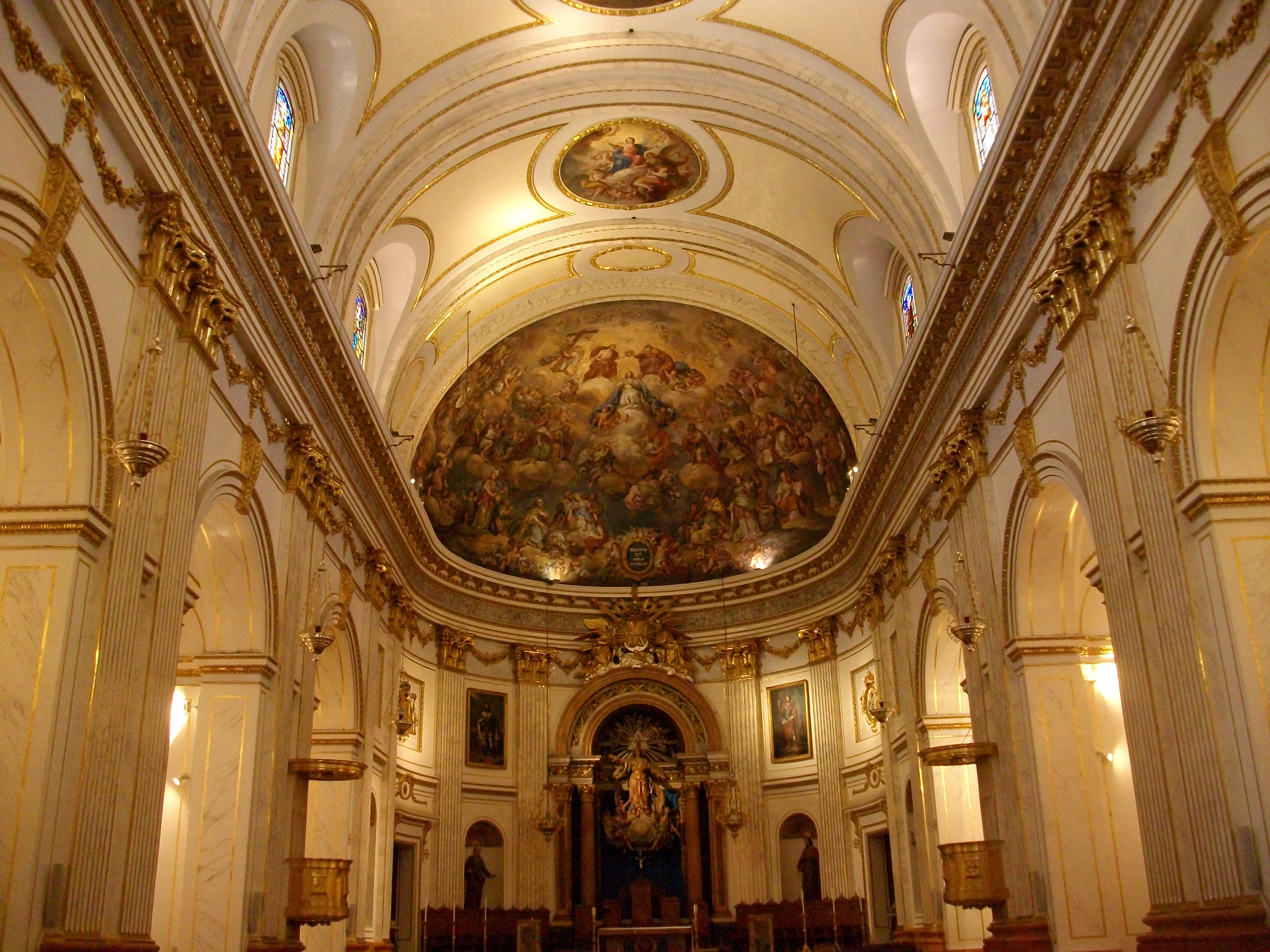
Interior of Segorbe Cathedral

The Diocese of Segorbe-Castellón (Latin: Dioecesis Segobricensis-Castillionensis; Valencian: Diòcesi de Sogorb-Castelló) is a Latin Church diocese of the Catholic Church located in north-eastern Spain, in the province of Castellón, part of the autonomous community of Valencia. The diocese forms part of the ecclesiastical province of Valencia, and is thus suffragan to the Archdiocese of Valencia.

== History ==
No name of any Bishop of Segorbe is known earlier than Proculus, who signed in the Third Council of Toledo (589). He was followed by a succession of bishop until Anterius, who attended the fifteenth (688) and the sixteenth (693). After this, there is no information of its bishops until the Arab invasion, when its church was converted into a mosque.

In 1172 Pedro Ruiz de Azagra, second son of the Lord of Estella, held the city of Albarracín, and succeeded in establishing there a bishop. Pedro's refusal to recognise Aragonese sovereignty extended to his bishop, Martin, who refused to recognise the supremacy of the Bishop of Zaragoza, though ordered to do so by the pope. Instead, Martin swore allegiance to the Metropolitan of Toledo. Four years later, Martin took instead the title of Bishop of Segorbe. This choice of name follows the ideology of the Reconquest, according to which the bishops were simply restoring the old Christian entities only temporarily taken over by the Moors. In this way, the city of Albarracín became the seat of the bishops of Segorbe.

When Segorbe was conquered by the king James I of Aragon in 1245, the cathedral seat was relocated from Albarracín to Segorbe. There arose serious territorial disputes with the Archdiocese of Valencia which claimed rights over several churches in Segorbe. The Bishop of Valencia, Arnau of Peralta, entered the church of Segorbe by force and expelled the prelate. The controversy being referred to Rome, Rome agreed with the Bishop of Segorbe-Albarracín. In 1318 Pope John XXII raised the see of Zaragoza to an Archdiocese, with the diocese of Segorbe-Albarracín as a suffragan.

The Cathedral of the Assumption of Our Lady of Segorbe, once a mosque, was reconsecrated in 1534, and in 1795 the nave was lengthened, and new altars added, in the episcopate of Lorenzo Gómez de Haedo.Amadó,

In 1577, Pope Gregory XIII, at the urging of Philip II of Spain, separated Albarracín and Segorbe. The terms of the papal bull specified that Segorbe belonged to the Kingdom of Valencia and Albarracín to that of Aragón. The order was well received in Albarracín, but not in Segorbe. The new bishopric of Albarracín was proclaimed a suffragan of Zaragoza, while that of Segorbe was of Valencia.

In 1960 the see became the Diocese of Segorbe-Castellón. Following the De mutatione finium Dioecesium Valentinae-Segorbicensis-Dertotensis decree, of 31 May 1960, the parishes belonging to the Province of València were dismembered and aggregated to the Archdiocese of Valencia. On the other hand, the Nules, Vila-real, Castelló de la Plana, Lucena and Albocàsser parishes that had belonged to the Roman Catholic Diocese of Tortosa were aggregated to the Diocese of Segorbe-Castellón along with the parish of Betxí.

== Present day ==
The Cathedral was elevated to the rank of minor basilica in 1985. Its time-stained tower and its cloister are built on a trapezoidal ground plan. It is connected by a bridge with the old episcopal palace. The Cathedral Museum is located in the upper cloister and its adjacent rooms.

== Bishops of Segorbe (6th and 7th centuries) ==
- c. 589: Proculus (Mentioned in the Third Council of Toledo of 589)
- c. 610: Porcarius (Mentioned in the Council of Gundemar of 610)
- c. 633: Antonius (Mentioned in the Fourth Council of Toledo of 633)
- c. 646: Floridius (Mentioned in the Seventh Council of Toledo of 646)
- c. 655: Eusicius (Mentioned in the Ninth and Tenth Councils of Toledo of 655 and 656)
- c. 680: Memorius (Mentioned in the eleventh and twelfth Councils of Toledo of 675 and 681)
- c. 683: Olipa (Mentioned in the Thirteenth Council of Toledo of 683)
- c. 690: Anterius (Mentioned in the fifteenth and sixteenth Councils of Toledo of 688 and 693)

Episcopal see suppressed (unknown–1173)

== Bishops of Segorbe (1173–1259) ==
Bishops of Segorbe with seat in Albarracín. All the names are given in Spanish:

1. 1173–1213: Martín
2. 1213–1215: Hispano
3. 1216–1222: Juan Gil
4. 1223–1234: Domingo
5. 1235–1238: Guillermo
6. 1245–1246: Jimeno
7. 1246–1259: Pedro

== Bishops of Segorbe-Albarracín (1259–1576) ==
All the names are given in Spanish:

1. 1259–1265: Martín Álvarez
2. 1265–1272: Pedro Garcés
3. 1272–1277: Pedro Jiménez de Segura
4. 1284–1288: Miguel Sánchez
5. 1288–1301: Aparicio
6. 1302–1318: Antonio Muñoz
7. 1319–1356: Sancho Dull
8. 1356–1362: Elías
9. 1362–1369: Juan Martínez de Barcelona
10. 1369–1387: Iñigo de Valterra
11. 1387–1400: Diego de Heredia
12. 1400–1409: Francisco Riquer y Bastero
13. 1410–1427: Juan de Tauste
14. 1428–1437: Francisco de Aguiló
15. 1438–1445: Jaime Gerart
16. 1445–1454: Gisberto Pardo de la Casta
17. 1455–1459: Luis de Milá y Borja
18. 1461–1473: Pedro Baldó
19. 1473–1498: Bartolomé Martí
20. 1498–1499: Juan Marrades
21. 1500–1530: Gilberto Martí
22. 1530–1556: Gaspar Jofre de Borja
23. 1556–1571: Juan de Muñatones
24. 1571–1576: Francisco de Soto Salazar

== Bishops of Segorbe (1577–1960) ==
1. 1577–1578: Francisco Sancho
2. 1579–1582: Gil Ruiz de Liori
3. 1583–1591: Martín de Salvatierra
4. 1591–1597: Juan Bautista Pérez Rubert
5. 1599–1609: Feliciano de Figueroa
6. 1610–1635: Pedro Ginés de Casanova
7. 1636–1638: Juan Bautista Pellicer
8. 1639–1652: Diego Serrano de Sotomayor
9. 1652–1660: Francisco Gavaldá
10. 1661–1672: Anastasio Vives de Rocamora
11. 1673–1679: José Sanchís y Ferrandis
12. 1680–1691: Crisóstomo Royo de Castellví
13. 1691–1707: Antonio Ferrer y Milán
14. 1708–1714: Rodrigo Marín Rubio
15. 1714–1730: Diego Muños de Baquerizo
16. 1731–1748: Francisco de Cepeda y Guerrero
17. 1749–1751: Francisco Cuartero
18. 1751–1757: Pedro Fernández Velarde
19. 1758–1770: Blas de Arganda
20. 1770–1780: Alonso Cano
21. 1780–1781: Lorenzo Lay Anzano
22. 1783–1808: Lorenzo Gómez de Haedo
23. 1814–1816: Lorenzo Algüero Ribera
24. 1816–1821: Francisco de la Dueña Cisneros
  - 1822–1824: Vicente Ramos García (Elected)
25. 1825–1837: Juan Sanz Palanco
26. 1847–1864: Domingo Canubio y Alberto
27. 1865–1868: Joaquín Hernández Herrero
28. 1868–1875: José Luis Montagut
29. 1876–1880: Mariano Miguel Gómez
30. 1880–1899: Francisco Aguilar
31. 1900–1907: Manuel García Cerero y Soler
32. 1907–1911: Antonio María Massanet
33. 1913–1934: Luis Amigó Ferrer
34. 1936–1936: Miguel de los Santos Serra y Sucarrats
35. 1944–1950: Ramón Sanahuja y Marcé
36. 1951–1960: José Pont y Gol

== Bishops of Segorbe-Castellón (since 1960) ==
1. 1960–1970: José Pont y Gol
2. 1971–1996: José María Cases Deordal
3. 1996–2005: Juan Antonio Reig Pla
4. 2006–today: Casimiro López Llorente

== See also ==
- List of the Roman Catholic dioceses of Spain
- Roman Catholic Diocese of Albarracín
- Segorbe Cathedral

== Sources ==
- IBERCRONOX: Obispado de Segorbe-Castellón (Segóbriga) (in Spanish)
