= Antonio Victor Pildáin y Zapiáin =

Spanish Roman Catholic bishop

His Most Reverend Antonio Victor Pildáin y Zapiáin
- Bishop of Diocese of Canarias
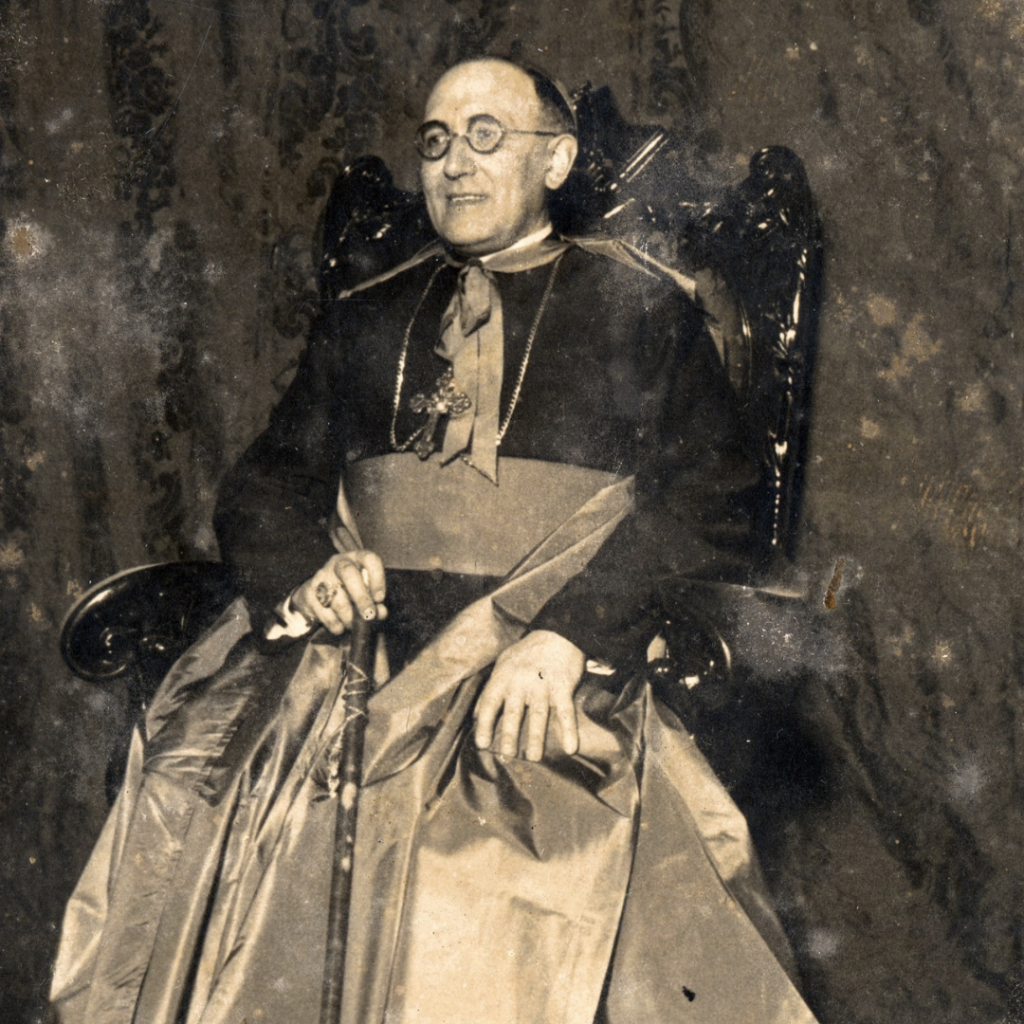
- Fortitudo nostra nomen Jesu
- Archdiocese: Seville
- Diocese: Canarias
- Predecessor: Miguel de los Santos Serra y Sucarrats
- Successor: José Antonio Infantes Florido

Orders
- Ordination: 13 September 1913
- Consecration: 14 February 1937 by Federico Tedeschini

Personal details
- Denomination: Roman Catholic
- Motto: Fortitudo nostra nomen Jesu

Antonio Victor Pildáin y Zapiáin (17 January 1890 - 7 May 1973) was a Spanish prelate of the Roman Catholic church and Bishop of the Diocese of Canarias.

== Biography ==
Pildáin was born on the 17 January 1890 in Guipúzcoa in the Basque region of Spain. He studied for the priesthood in Vitoria-Gasteiz and Rome and was ordained on 13 September 1913. On the 18 May 1936, Pope Pius XI named him bishop of the Diocese of Canarias - part of the Canary Islands including the islands of Gran Canaria, Lanzarote and Fuerteventura. He retired from his role in 1966 and died in Las Palmas on 7 May 1973.

== See also ==
- Diocese of Canarias
- Diocese of Tenerife (the remaining Canary Islands)
