= Segorbe Cathedral =

Cathedral in Segorbe, Spain

Cathedral of the Assumption of Our Lady Catedral de la Asunción de la Virgen
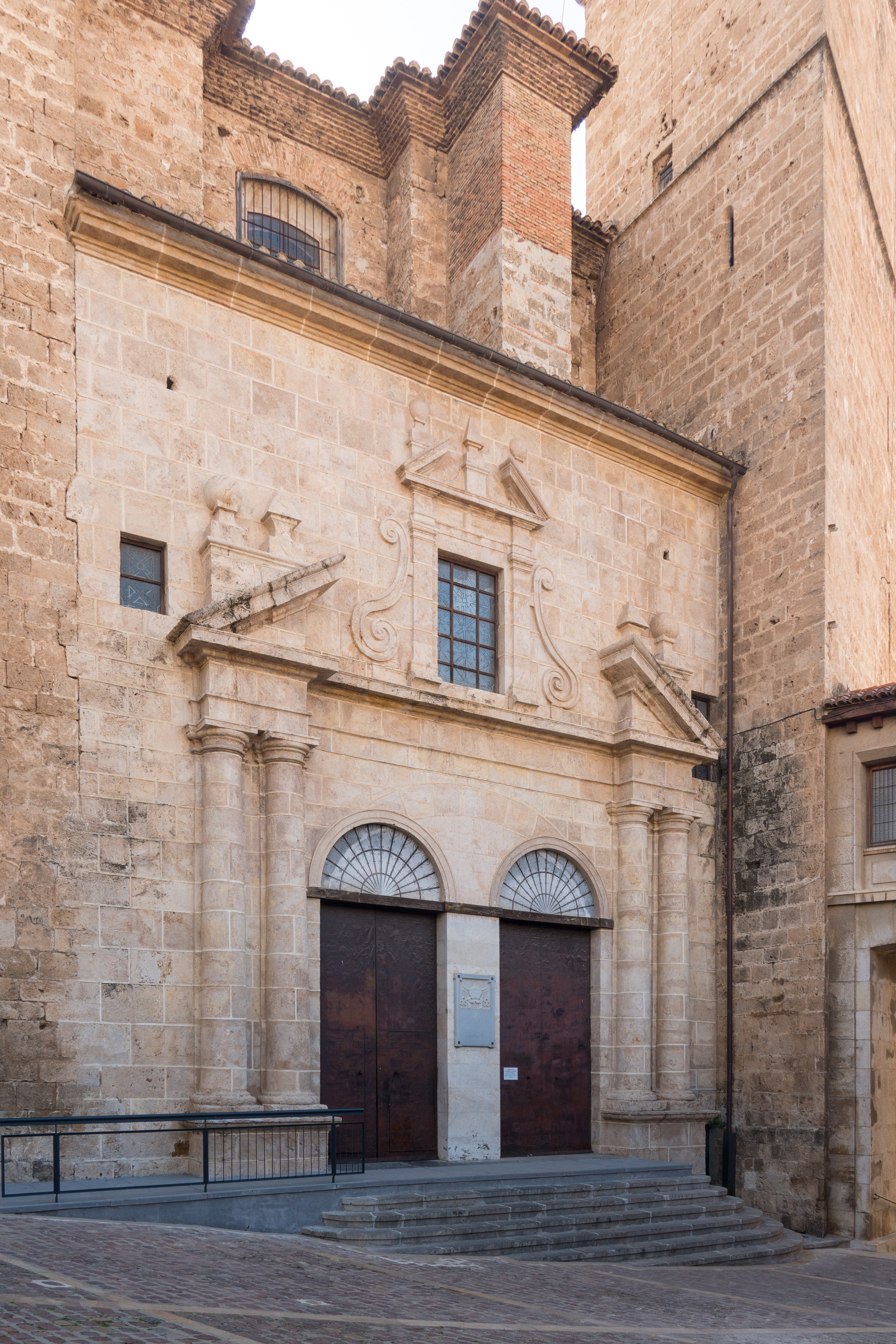
- View of the façade of the Cathedral of Segorbe.

Religion
- Affiliation: Roman Catholic Church
- Ecclesiastical or organisational status: Cathedral, minor basilica
- Leadership: B. Casimiro López Llorente
- Year consecrated: 1534

Location
- Location: Segorbe, Spain
- Interactive map of Cathedral of the Assumption of Our Lady; Catedral de la Asunción de la Virgen
- Coordinates: 39°51′8.2″N 0°29′17.7″W

Architecture
- Type: Church
- Style: Valencian Gothic, Neoclassical
- Groundbreaking: 1246
- Completed: 17th century
- Spanish Cultural Heritage
- Official name: Santa Iglesia Catedral Basílica de Santa María de la Asunción
- Designated: 24 September 2002
- Reference no.: (R.I.)-51-0009270

Website
- www.catedraldesegorbe.es

The Cathedral of the Assumption of Our Lady of Segorbe (Spanish: Catedral de la Asunción de la Virgen) is a Roman Catholic church in Segorbe, province of Castellón, Spain. It is the see of the Diocese of Segorbe-Castellon. It was elevated to the rank of minor basilica in 1985.

== History ==
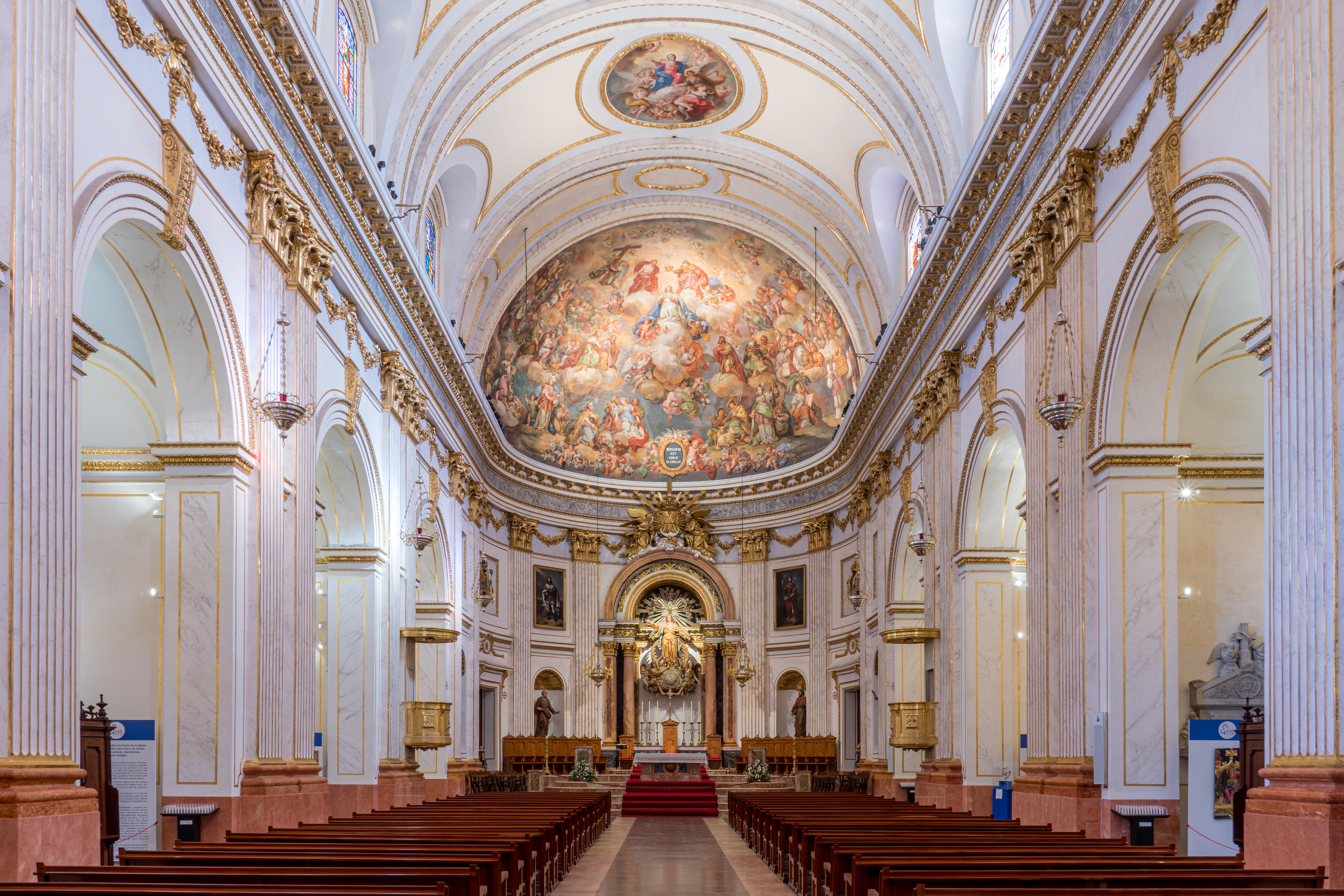
Interior and Main Altar

Located against the city's walls, the church, once a mosque, has been completely rebuilt in 1246 in Valencian Gothic style in such a manner that it preserves no trace of Arab architecture. Of this 13th-century edifice, only parts of the western façade, the vaults of several chapels, the load-bearing walls, the tower of Santa Barbara, the bell tower and the cloister remain. It was consecrated on 7 May 1534, and has a single, cross-vaulted nave, without transept and dome, with chapels located between the buttresses. It is connected by a bridge with the old episcopal palace.

The bell tower, with a massive appearance and a square plan, is typically Romanesque in his simplicity. It stands at a height of 36 metres (118 ft). The Gothic cloister has a trapezoidal plan and two floors: the lower one dates to the 14th-15th centuries, while the other was added in the late 15th and early 16th centuries. The main façade dates to 1665.

The presbytery was renewed in Renaissance style during the 16th century; the high altar was also added in 1530, under design by Vicente Juan Masip. The church is decorated by frescoes of Luis Planes.

The church was renovated in 1791-1795 in Neo-classic style, resulting in the nearly total hiding of the Gothic structure. The nave was lengthened, and new altars were added.

== Museum ==
The Cathedral museum houses several artworks by local and foreign artists, belonging to the International Gothic, the 15th-century Flemish painting, the 16th-century Valencian school and more recent ones. Artists represented include Jaume Mateu (St. Jerome Altarpiece, c. 1450), Vicente Juan Masip and his son Juan (two 16th-century altarpieces), as well as the Italian Donatello, with an attributed work.
