= Jorge Alberto Ossa Soto =

Colombian Roman Catholic archbishop (born 1956)

The Most Reverend Jorge Alberto Ossa Soto
- Archbishop of Nueva Pamplona
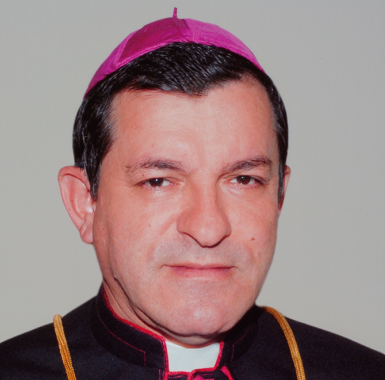
- Archdiocese: Nueva Pamplona
- Appointed: 15 October 2019
- Installed: 28 November 2019
- Predecessor: Luis Madrid Merlano
- Successor: Incumbent

Orders
- Ordination: 23 May 1982
- Consecration: 1 March 2003 by Alonso Llano Ruiz

Personal details
- Born: 29 July 1956 (age 70) El Carmen de Viboral, Antioquia Department, Colombia
- Education: University of Innsbruck
- Motto: Scio Cui Credidi
- Coat of arms

Jorge Alberto Ossa Soto (born 29 July 1956) is a Colombian Roman Catholic prelate who has served as archbishop of the Archdiocese of Nueva Pamplona since 2019. He previously served as bishop of the Diocese of Florencia from 2003 to 2011 and bishop of the Diocese of Santa Rosa de Osos from 2011 to 2019. He has also served as apostolic administrator of the Diocese of Tibú and the Diocese of Ocaña.

== Early life and education ==
Ossa Soto was born in El Carmen de Viboral, in the Archdiocese of Medellín, on 29 July 1956. He studied at the Minor Seminary of San Pío X in Istmina and subsequently at the Major Seminary of San Pío X of the Diocese of Istmina-Tadó. He later obtained a licentiate in Dogmatic Theology from the University of Innsbruck in Austria.

He was ordained a priest for the Diocese of Istmina-Tadó on 23 May 1982. During his priestly ministry he served in several pastoral and administrative positions, including as parish priest, diocesan treasurer, director of diocesan social projects, rector of the Major Seminary of San Pío X, and vicar general of the diocese.

== Episcopate ==
=== Bishop of Florencia ===
On 21 January 2003, Pope John Paul II appointed Ossa Soto bishop of the Diocese of Florencia, Colombia. At the time of his appointment, he was vicar general and rector of the Major Seminary of San Pío X of the Diocese of Istmina-Tadó.

He received his episcopal consecration on 1 March 2003 at the church of Nuestra Señora del Carmen in El Carmen de Viboral. Alonso Llano Ruiz, bishop of Istmina-Tadó, was the principal consecrator, with Luis Madrid Merlano, bishop of Cartago, and José de Jesús Quintero Díaz, titular bishop of Chimaera, as principal co-consecrators. Ossa Soto took canonical possession of the Diocese of Florencia on 29 March 2003.

During his tenure in Florencia, the diocesan website reported initiatives involving social assistance, education, communications, and pastoral development.

=== Bishop of Santa Rosa de Osos ===
On 15 July 2011, Pope Benedict XVI appointed Ossa Soto bishop of the Diocese of Santa Rosa de Osos, transferring him from Florencia. The Diocese of Florencia's archived website also reported his transfer to Santa Rosa de Osos.

He served as bishop of Santa Rosa de Osos until his appointment as archbishop of Nueva Pamplona in 2019.

=== Archbishop of Nueva Pamplona ===
On 15 October 2019, Pope Francis appointed Ossa Soto archbishop of the Archdiocese of Nueva Pamplona, succeeding Luis Madrid Merlano. He was installed as archbishop on 28 November 2019.

From 12 December 2020 to 12 February 2022, Ossa Soto served as apostolic administrator of the Diocese of Tibú.

On 15 January 2023, he was appointed apostolic administrator of the Diocese of Ocaña. He ceased serving as apostolic administrator on 28 September 2024.
