= Maria Berenice Hencker =

Colombian religious sister and Blessed

Blessed María Berenice Hencker OP
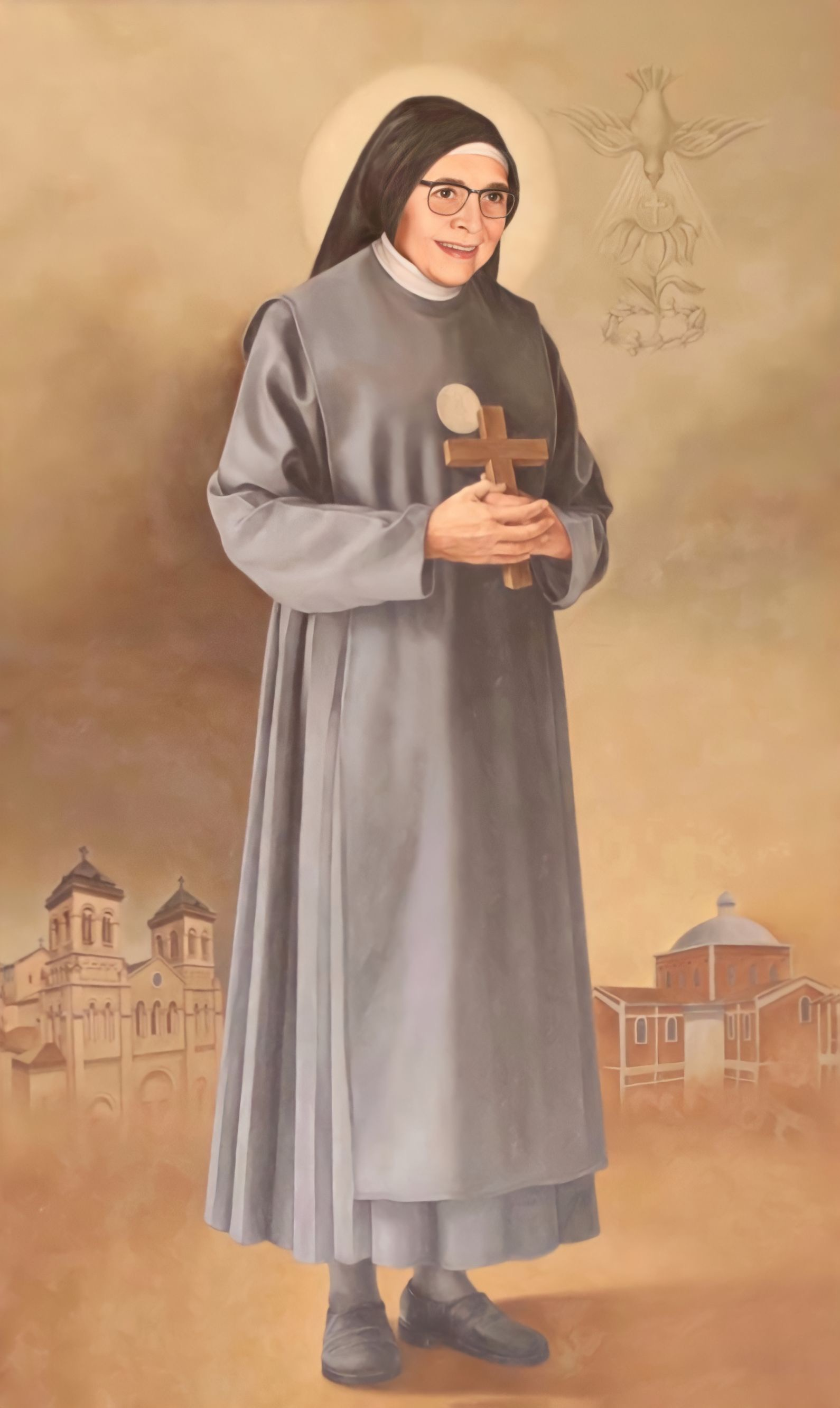
- Official image used for the beatification
- Born: 14 August 1898; Salamina, Caldas, Colombia
- Died: 25 July 1993 (aged 94); Medellín, Antioquia, Colombia
- Venerated in: Roman Catholic Church
- Beatified: 29 October 2022, Cathedral of La Inmaculada Concepción de María, Medellín, Colombia by Cardinal Marcello Semeraro
- Feast: 24 July
- Attributes: Religious habit, crucifix

María Berenice Hencker (14 August 1898 – 25 July 1993), born as Ana Julia Duque Hencker, was a Colombian religious sister and the founder of the Little Sisters of the Annunciation. Hencker first entered the Dominican nuns in Bogotá in 1917 where she made her solemn vows after the completion of her novitiate. It was after this that she spent the next three decades teaching children in various locations until she saw the plight of the poor and the minorities around her; she decided to establish a religious congregation that would cater to their needs and secured support from the Archbishop of Bogotá to achieve this.

Hencker was a prolific writer and was known to write articles and books in service to her fellow sisters that would touch upon the aims of the congregation she founded and on various themes that she wanted it to address. Through her congregation she was able to establish schools and nurseries with a particular emphasis on girls and women who were often left sidelined in Colombian life and left to fend for themselves. Hencker focused on the disadvantaged regions in Colombia and exhorted her sisters to tend to the marginalized and those on the peripheries such as prostitutes and drug addicts. She also founded several branches of the congregation that would cater to people living in the world and to priests who shared her desire to evangelize among the poor and tend to those on the societal peripheries.

The beatification process launched in Medellín in 1998 and Hencker was titled a Servant of God. Hencker was beatified in Medellín on 29 October 2022.

== Life ==
Ana Julia Duque Hencker was born on 14 August 1898 in Salamina in the Caldas Department as the eldest of nineteen children born to Antonio José Duque Botero and Ana Berenice Hencker Rister (of German origins). Five of her siblings entered into the religious life with one brother becoming a priest and three sisters all becoming religious; Elías became a priest while María, Lucila, and Tulia all became nuns. Hencker was baptized on 16 August in the Immaculate Conception parish in Salamina; on 31 October 1902 received her Confirmation from the Bishop of Manizales Gregorio Nacianceno Hoyos and on 7 September 1907 made her First Communion. Her parents provided for her initial religious formation and it was from them that she developed a strong devotion to the Mother of God and would herald her known trait of reciting frequent rosaries.

But she was an avid reader in her childhood and fostered a strong desire to become a Carmelite after she read the works of Teresa of Ávila since the writings of the saint strengthened her faith and religious ideals. Hencker worked in her parish as a catechist and became part of a Marian group that was active in the parish. But difficulties arose when she turned fifteen since her parents indicated that it was time for her to consider marriage in the future. Her parents had also indicated this to her since it was hoped that it would see her abandon her desires for the religious life since she was the eldest and some of her siblings had expressed similar intentions. Hencker refused their attempts and instead in November 1917 entered a convent and decided to join the Dominican Sisters of the Presentation in Bogotá on 20 December 1917.

Hencker entered the Dominican Sisters of the Presentation in November 1917 in Bogotá as a postulant before she commenced her novitiate there; she was invested in the religious habit on 26 July 1919. She made her solemn vows on 21 November 1919 and assumed the religious name María Berenice upon her profession. The next three decades would see her serve as an teacher and she would work at colleges first at San Gil and Ubaté before she was transferred to Manizales (and on occasion in Fredonia which was close to the town) and Rionegro. But she also worked to establish a school for girls of poorer families and of Afro-Colombian descent to whom she taught reading and writing as well as to train them in catechism and housework. But what caused her much suffering was that women of color could not enter a convent due to racial discrimination or on the basis of their poor economic backgrounds. Hencker came to see the poor as the chosen ones of God and when she ended up founding a congregation welcomed those women with the noted phrase: "They are hidden treasures of God". In 1930 she travelled to Medellín to work as an assistant for the formative process for those who had just entered into the religious life. But from 1938 to 1942 she increased her apostolate among the poor and often visited textile factories to instruct people in catechism or to just talk about God and the Gospel to the workers. But it was during that time that she also visited the dangerous regions that were known for being havens for criminals and drug addicts as well as for alcoholics and prostitutes to whom she tried to evangelize and convert from a life of sin. It was in those neighborhoods that she developed a strong sense of social justice and a powerful goal to cater to the needs of those on the societal peripheries.

Hencker organized Marian conferences and also organized spiritual retreats and meetings in different places that included hospitals and clinics. She also helped to establish Catholic Action units as a means to attract adolescents to a stronger religious vocation. But a particular focus was spent on the women that desired entrance into the religious life; she often helped them in their formation and also helped them to discern their call to the religious life. Hencker also focused on welcoming poorer girls and girls of color as well as those of unmarried parents. She came to realize over time that she alone could not resolve the different situations that these girls faced and realized that she needed further support to be able to manage such a broad and difficult apostolate.

Hencker secured permission from her provincial superior and the Archbishop of Medellín Joaquín García Benítez to set up the basis for what would become her own religious congregation and on 14 May 1943 started steps towards this goal. Hencker had seen the plight of girls and women who often tended to end up on the margins of Colombian life and were more often than not forced to fend for themselves; she wanted to help them and had a stronger urge to tend to those who lived and struggled on the societal peripheries. This hard work paid off on 6 October 1953 when the Congregation for Religious provided her with the permission needed to establish the Little Sisters of the Annunciation with further permission that she act as its first Superior General. Further permission for the congregation came on 5 August 1954 when she obtained a decree of perpetual adoration while the construction of the motherhouse would commence in Medellín in 1955. The first women who joined her were almost all of color and Hencker helped to form them in the ideals that she wanted the congregation to possess.

But difficulties soon arose when some of the women were sent to tend to other apostolates and she herself was sent to France where she fell ill before she could even return to her homeland in 1947. It was upon her return that she resumed her apostolate with a renewed vigor to make up for lost time despite the initial setbacks that saw her almost have to begin anew. Hencker helped the congregation recover from its brief stagnation due to her brief dismissal to France and helped them to further expand their work outside of Medellín and into other regions. She also supported the apostolic nuncio Paolo Bertoli in further promoting the Catholic Action movement in Colombia. It was around this time that she began to write the constitutions and received further support from Archbishop Joaquín García Benítez who had an active role in assisting Hencker and her companions. This led to the congregation receiving canonical recognition from the archbishop on 3 October 1950 as a pious union and then on 2 July 1953 as a institute of diocesan right. Hencker put on the new congregation's habit on 23 October 1953 and made her perpetual vows. She made a pilgrimage to Israel in 1954 and made other trips to France and Rome (a Marian year had been called hence her pilgrimage to Rome). Between 1962 and 1965 she reviewed the documents from the Second Vatican Council and encouraged religious renewal among her sisters through studies of the documents. In 1967 she stepped down as the Superior General and continued her apostolate to tend to the ill despite her own illness and sent some of her sisters to Rome for further studies. Hencker founded the Afro-Colombian Missionaries on 15 August 1957 after she received a series of requests from some people of color from the Colombian coast. Her tenure as the Superior General saw houses open in Ecuador and Peru but also crossed international borders with a house opened in Spain. The institute received the papal decree of praise from Pope Pius XII on 25 March 1958.

Hencker established the Domus Dei Institute (it has since been renamed as the Missionaries of the Annunciation) which she established with the aim of welcoming priests and religious brothers into the congregation who shared her views on the service to those that suffered from societal marginalization.

Her illness returned sometime in the 1970s and was manageable until it saw her confined to bed rest. This long illness led to her death in Medellín on 25 July 1993 at 2:20 pm. The Bishop Emeritus of Santa Rosa de Osos Joaquín García Ordóñez presided over her funeral on 28 July with the Archbishop of Medellín Héctor Rueda Hernández as a concelebrant. Her congregation continued to expand upon her death and is now established in fifteen countries (such as the Philippines and Côte d'Ivoire) around the world as she had once hoped. Her remains are housed at the order's motherhouse in Medellín.

== Beatification ==
The beatification process opened on 12 October 1998 after the Congregation for the Causes of Saints issued the official nihil obstat ("no objections") edict that provided the Medellín archdiocese permission to launch the diocesan investigation. That process started on 14 August 1998 (two months before the nihil obstat had been provided) but had started before formal approval had been provided since it started to deal in initial document gathering and swearing in the participants involved to manage the process. The Archbishop of Medellín Alberto Giraldo Jaramillo closed the diocesan process on 23 October 2003 and the documentation was submitted to the C.C.S. in Rome. The C.C.S. provided a decree of validation on 26 August 2005 that determined that all the correct evidence had been submitted to them and that the diocesan process had been conducted according to their regulations. The postulation (the officials managing the cause) submitted the "Positio" dossier to the C.C.S. in 2009 for additional evaluation.

Nine theologians approved the Positio on 19 December 2018 and the cardinal and bishop members of the C.C.S. also provided their approval to the cause on 15 January 2019. On 12 February 2019 Pope Francis signed a decree that determined that Hencker could be titled venerable on the account of her life of heroic virtue. Francis later signed a decree that approved a miracle attributed to her intercession on 13 October 2021 (medical consultants advising the C.C.S. approved it in March 2021 as did nine theologians in June 2021) which therefore enabled for Hencker to be beatified. The miracle was the healing of a thirteen year old girl in April 2004.The beatification was celebrated in Medellín on 29 October 2022.

The postulator for this cause is Alix Mercedes Duarte Roa, HA.
