= Diocese of Barrancabermeja =

Diocese of the Catholic Church in Colombia

Coordinates: 7.0605°N 73.8719°W

Diocese of Barrancabermeja Dioecesis Barrancabermeiensis

Catholic

Location
- Country: Colombia
- Ecclesiastical province: Bucaramanga

Statistics
- Area: 15,000 km^{2} (5,800 sq mi)
- Population: Total; Catholics: (as of 2004); 540,000; 320,000 (59.3%)

Information
- Rite: Latin Rite
- Established: 2 April 1928 (98 years ago)
- Cathedral: Catedral del Sagrado Corazón

Current leadership
- Pope: Leo XIV
- Bishop: Ovidio Giraldo Velásquez
- Metropolitan Archbishop: Ismael Rueda Sierra
- Bishops emeritus: Camilo Fernando Castrellon Pizano, S.D.B.

Map

The Roman Catholic Diocese of Barrancabermeja (Latin: Barrancabermeiensis) is a Latin suffragan diocese in the ecclesiastical province of Bucaramanga.

Its cathedral episcopal see is the Catedral del Sagrado Corazón, dedicated to the Sacred Heart, in the city of Barrancabermeja in Santander State, Colombia.

== Statistics ==
As per 2014, it pastorally served 430,000 Catholics (71.9% of 598,000 total) on 15,000 km², in 34 parishes and 8 missions, with 71 priests (57 diocesan, 14 religious), 1 deacon, 44 lay religious (15 brothers, 29 sisters) and 22 seminarians.

== History ==
- Established on 2 April 1928 as Territorial Prelature of Río Magdalena, named after the Magdalena River, on canonical territories split off from the Diocese of Nueva Pamplona and Diocese of Socorro y San Gil
- Promoted on 18 April 1950 and renamed after its see as Apostolic Vicariate of Barrancabermeja
- Promoted on 27 October 1962 as Diocese of Barrancabermeja

== Bishops ==
(all Latin Rite)

=== Ordinaries ===
Territorial Prelates of Río Magdalena

- Father Carlo Ilario Currea, Jesuits (S.J.) (1929.01.08 – 1932)
- Father Raffaello Toro, S.J. (1932.02.20 – 1947)
- Bishop-elect Bernardo Arango Henao, S.J. (1947 – 1950.04.18 see below)

Apostolic Vicar of Barrancabermeja

- Bernardo Arango Henao, S.J. (see above 1950.04.18 – 1962.10.27 see below), Titular Bishop of Bela (1950.04.18 – 1962.10.27)

Suffragan Bishops of Barrancabermeja

- Bernardo Arango Henao, S.J. (see above 1962.10.27 – 1983.12.23)
- Juan Francisco Sarasti Jaramillo, Eudists (C.I.M.) (1983.12.23 – 1993.03.25); previously Titular Bishop of Egara (1978.03.08 – 1983.12.23) as Auxiliary Bishop of Cali (Colombia) (1978.03.08 – 1983.12.23); later Metropolitan Archbishop of Ibagué (1993.03.25 - 2002.08.17), Metropolitan Archbishop of above Cali (2002.08.17 – retired 2011.05.18), Apostolic Administrator of Buenaventura (Colombia) (2004.02.21 – 2004.04.29)
- Jaime Prieto Amaya (1993.11.11 – 2009.12.02), later Bishop of Cúcuta (Colombia) (2008.12.01 – death 2010.08.25), Apostolic Administrator of Nueva Pamplona (Colombia) (2009.09 – 2010.03.30)
- Apostolic Administrator Ignacio José Gómez Aristizábal (2009.02 – 2009.12.02), while Metropolitan Archbishop of Santa Fe de Antioquia (Colombia) (1992.10.10 – 2007.01.12)
- Camilo Fernando Castrellon Pizano, S.D.B. (2009.12.02 – 2020.05.29), previously Bishop of Tibú (Colombia) (2001.04.23 – 2009.12.02)
- Ovidio Giraldo Velásquez (2020.05.29 -)

=== Other priests of this diocese who became bishops ===
- José Figueroa Gómez, appointed Bishop of Granada en Colombia in 2002
- Orlando Olave Villanoba, appointed Bishop of Tumaco in 2017

== See also ==
- Roman Catholicism in Colombia

== Sources and external links ==
- GCatholic.org
