= Víctor Manuel López Forero =

Roman Catholic prelate (1931–2023)

- Archbishop Emertus of Bucaramanga
- Appointed: 27 June 1998
- Term ended: 13 February 2009
- Predecessor: Darío Castrillón Hoyos
- Successor: Ismael Rueda Sierra
- Previous posts: Auxiliary Bishop of Bogotá and Titular Bishop of Afufenia (1977–1980); Bishop of Socorro y San Gil (1980–1985); Titular Bishop of Cilibia (1985–1994); Archbishop of Nueva Pamplona (1994–1998)

Orders
- Ordination: 27 October 1957
- Consecration: 29 June 1977 by Aníbal Muñoz Duque

Personal details
- Born: 29 March 1931 Puente Nacional, Colombia
- Died: 23 September 2023 (aged 92) Bucaramanga, Colombia

Víctor Manuel López Forero (29 March 1931 – 23 September 2023) was a Colombian prelate of the Catholic Church. He served as bishop of Socorro y San Gil from 1980 to 1985, archbishop of Nueva Pamplona from 1994 to 1998 and archbishop of Bucaramanga from 1998 to 2009.

== Biography ==
Víctor Manuel López Forero was ordained a priest on 27 October 1957 and was incardinated into the clergy of the Archdiocese of Bogotá. He was appointed by Pope Paul VI as auxiliary bishop of Bogotá and titular bishop of Afufenia, on 6 May 1977.

The Archbishop of Bogotá and Military Vicar of Colombia, Cardinal Aníbal Muñoz Duque, ordained López bishop on 29 June of the same year; The co-consecrators were José Gabriel Calderón Contreras, Bishop of Cartago, and Alfonso López Trujillo, Auxiliary Archbishop ad personam in Bogotá.

Pope John Paul II appointed López as Bishop of Socorro y San Gil on 6 December 1980. On 7 June 1985, he was named Military Vicar of Colombia and Titular Bishop of Cilíbia. On 21 June 1994, he was named Archbishop of Nueva Pamplona. On 27 June 1998, he was named Archbishop of Bucaramanga. On 13 February 2009, Pope Benedict XVI accepted López's request to resign due to age.

López died in Bucaramanga on 23 September 2023, at the age of 92.

Catholic Church titles
Preceded by Darío Castrillón Hoyos	Archbishop of Bucaramanga; 1998–2009	Succeeded by Ismael Rueda Sierra
Preceded by Rafael Sarmiento Peralta	Archbishop of Nueva Pamplona; 1994–1998	Succeeded by Gustavo Martínez Frías
Preceded by First	Titular Bishop of Cilibia; 1985–1994	Succeeded by Javier Echevarría Rodríguez
Preceded by Ciro Alfonso Gómez Serrano	Bishop of Socorro y San Gil; 1980–1985	Succeeded by Jorge Leonardo Gómez Serna
Preceded by Paolo Vieri Andreotti	Titular Bishop of Afufenia; 1977–1980	Succeeded by Francis Bible Schulte
Preceded by —	Auxiliary Bishop of Bogotá; 1977–1980	Succeeded by —
