= Israel Bravo Cortés =

Colombian Catholic bishop

- Bishop of Tibú
- Church: Catholic Church
- Archdiocese: Nueva Pamplona
- Appointed: 5 November 2021
- Installed: 5 February 2022
- Predecessor: Omar Alberto Sánchez Cubillos

Orders
- Ordination: 1 February 1997
- Consecration: 5 February 2022 by Luis Mariano Montemayor

Personal details
- Born: 4 June 1971 (age 54); El Espinal, Tolima, Colombia

Israel Bravo Cortés (born 4 June 1971) is a Colombian prelate of the Catholic Church. He has served as bishop of the Diocese of Tibú since November 2021.

== Biography ==
Bravo was ordained a priest on 1 February 1997 and incardinated in the diocese of Cúcuta. He worked mainly as a parish priest, but also, among others, an educator in a diocesan seminary and a vicar general.

On 5 November 2021, Bravo was appointed by Pope Francis as Bishop of Tibú. He was consecrated on 5 February 2022 by the Apostolic Nunciature to Colombia, Archbishop Luis Mariano Montemayor.
