= Hernán Giraldo Jaramillo =

Colombian Roman Catholic prelate (1936–2026)

His Excellency Hernán Giraldo Jaramillo
- Bishop Emeritus of Buga
- Archdiocese: Cali
- Diocese: Buga
- Appointed: 19 January 2001
- Term ended: 10 May 2012
- Predecessor: Rodrigo Arango Velásquez
- Successor: José Roberto Ospina Leongómez
- Other post: Apostolic Administrator of Magangué (2012–2015)
- Previous posts: Auxiliary Bishop of Pereira and Titular Bishop of Alexanum (1984–1987); Bishop of Málaga–Soatá (1987–2001)

Orders
- Ordination: 15 August 1964
- Consecration: 6 August 1984 by José Gabriel Calderón Contreras, Darío Castrillón Hoyos and Alberto Giraldo Jaramillo

Personal details
- Born: 21 October 1936 Manizales, Colonbia
- Died: 3 January 2026 (aged 89) Cartago, Valle del Cauca, Colombia
- Motto: Testigo De Amor

Hernán Giraldo Jaramillo (21 October 1936 – 3 January 2026) was a Colombian Roman Catholic prelate.

== Biography ==
On 27 June 1984, Pope John Paul II appointed him auxiliary bishop of Diocese of Pereira and titular bishop of Alexanum. On 1 July 1987, he was appointed the first bishop of the diocese of Málaga-Soatá, which was established on the same date. On 19 January 2001, he was appointed Bishop of Buga.

On 10 May 2012, Pope Benedict XVI accepted his retirement due to age.

Giraldo Jaramillo died on 3 January 2026, at the age of 89.

Catholic Church titles
Preceded by Rodrigo Arango Velásquez	Bishop of Buga; 2001–2012	Succeeded by José Roberto Ospina Leongómez
Preceded by Position established	Bishop of Málaga–Soatá; 1987–2001	Succeeded by Darío de Jesús Monsalve Mejía
Preceded by William Russell Houck	Titular Bishop of Alexanum; 1984–1987	Succeeded by Natalino Pescarolo
Preceded by —	Auxiliary Bishop of Pereira; 1984–1987	Succeeded by —
