= Diocese of Quibdó =

Diocese of the Catholic Church in Colombia

Coordinates: 5°41′32″N 76°39′29″W

Diocese of Quibdó Dioecesis Quibduana

Catholic

Location
- Country: Colombia
- Ecclesiastical province: Santa Fe de Antioquia

Statistics
- Area: 12,758 km^{2} (4,926 sq mi)
- Population: Total; Catholics: (as of 2004); 227,000; 215,470 (94.9%)

Information
- Rite: Latin Rite
- Established: 14 November 1952 (73 years ago)
- Cathedral: Catedral de San Francisco de Asís

Current leadership
- Pope: Leo XIV
- Bishop: Wiston Mosquera Moreno

Map

Website
- diocesisquibdo.org

The Roman Catholic Diocese of Quibdó (Latin: Dioecesis Quibduana) is a diocese located in the city of Quibdó in the ecclesiastical province of Santa Fe de Antioquia in Colombia.

== History ==
- 14 November 1952: Established as Apostolic Vicariate of Quibdó from the Diocese of Antioquía and Apostolic Prefecture of Chocó
- 30 April 1990: Promoted as Diocese of Quibdó

== Ordinaries ==
- Vicars Apostolic of Quibdó
  - Pedro Grau y Arola, C.M.F. † (24 Mar 1953 – 6 Jun 1983) Retired
  - Jorge Iván Castaño Rubio, C.M.F. (6 Jun 1983 – 30 Apr 1990) Appointed, Bishop of Quibdó (see below)
- Bishops of Quibdó
  - Jorge Iván Castaño Rubio, C.M.F. (30 Apr 1990 – 16 Feb 2001) Appointed, Auxiliary Bishop of Medellín
  - Fidel León Cadavid Marin (25 Jul 2001 – 2 Feb 2011) Appointed, Bishop of Sonsón-Rionegro
  - Juan Carlos Barreto Barreto (30 Jan 2013 – 2022)
  - Wiston Mosquera Moreno (2024 – present)

== See also ==
- Roman Catholicism in Colombia
