= Diocese of Vélez =

Diocese of the Catholic Church in Colombia

Diocese of Vélez Dioecesis Velezana

Catholic

Location
- Country: Colombia
- Ecclesiastical province: Bucaramanga

Statistics
- Area: 4,958 km^{2} (1,914 sq mi)
- Population: Total; Catholics: (as of 2004); 200,000; 180,000 (90.0%)

Information
- Denomination: Catholic Church
- Rite: Latin Rite
- Established: 14 May 2003 (23 years ago)
- Cathedral: Catedral Nuestra Señora de las Nieves

Current leadership
- Pope: Leo XIV
- Bishop: José Camilo Arbeláez Montoya
- Metropolitan Archbishop: Ismael Rueda Sierra

Map

The Roman Catholic Diocese of Vélez (Latin: Dioecesis Velezana) is a diocese located in the city of Vélez in the ecclesiastical province of Bucaramanga in Colombia.

== History ==
- 14 May 2003: Established as Diocese of Vélez from the Diocese of Socorro y San Gil

== Ordinaries ==
- Luis Albeiro Cortés Rendón (May 14, 2003 – November 30, 2015), appointed Auxiliary Bishop of Pereira
- Marco Antonio Merchán Ladino (October 26, 2016 – April 14, 2023), appointed Bishop of Neiva
- José Camilo Arbeláez Montoya (November 14, 2025 – Present)

== See also ==
- Roman Catholicism in Colombia
