= Diocese of Istmina–Tadó =

Diocese of the Catholic Church in Colombia

Coordinates: 5°10′N 76°41′W

Diocese of Istmina–Tadó Dioecesis Istminana-Taduana

Catholic

Location
- Country: Colombia
- Ecclesiastical province: Santa Fe de Antioquia

Statistics
- Area: 22,240 km^{2} (8,590 sq mi)
- Population: Total; Catholics: (as of 2006); 206,000; 181,000 (87.9%)

Information
- Rite: Latin Rite
- Established: 14 November 1952 (73 years ago)
- Cathedral: Catedral de San Pablo Apóstol
- Co-cathedral: Co-Cathedral of St. Joseph (Tadó)

Current leadership
- Pope: Leo XIV
- Bishop: Mario de Jesús Álvarez Gómez

Map

The Roman Catholic Diocese of Istmina–Tadó (Latin: Dioecesis Istminana-Taduana) is a diocese located in the cities of Istmina and Tadó in the ecclesiastical province of Santa Fe de Antioquia in Colombia.

== History ==
- 14 November 1952: Established as Diocese of Istmina from the Apostolic Prefecture of Chocó
- 30 April 1990: Renamed as Diocese of Istmina – Tadó

== Bishops ==
=== Ordinaries ===
- Bishop of Istmina
  - Gustavo Posada Peláez, M.X.Y. (24 Mar 1953 – 30 Apr 1990), appointed Bishop of Istmina–Tadó (see below)
- Bishops of Istmina–Tadó
  - Gustavo Posada Peláez, M.X.Y. (30 Apr 1990 – 5 May 1993)
  - Alonso Llano Ruiz (5 May 1993 – 5 Jun 2010)
  - Julio Hernando García Peláez (5 Jun 2010 – 15 Jun 2017), appointed Bishop of Garagoa
  - Mario de Jesús Álvarez Gómez (3 Feb 2018–present)

=== Other priests of this diocese who became bishops ===
- Luis Madrid Merlano, appointed Prelate of Tibú in 1988
- Jorge Alberto Ossa Soto, appointed Bishop of Florencia in 2003

== See also ==
- Roman Catholicism in Colombia
