= Co-Cathedral of St. Joseph (Tadó) =

Coordinates: 5°15′48″N 76°33′42″W

- Concatedral de San José de Tadó
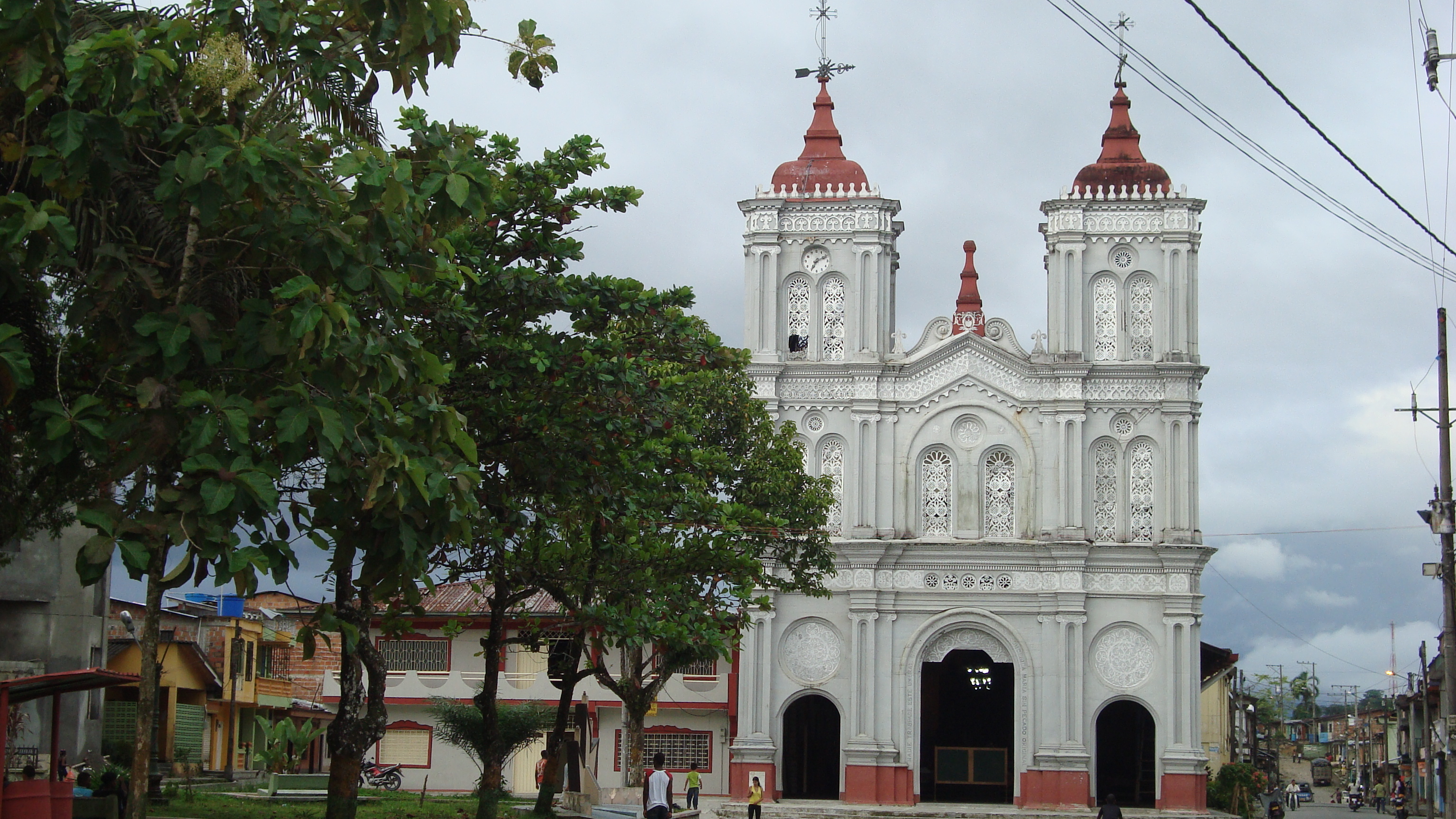
- Co-Cathedral of St. Joseph
- Location: Tadó
- Country: Colombia
- Denomination: Roman Catholic Church

Administration
- Diocese: Roman Catholic Diocese of Istmina–Tadó

The Co-Cathedral of St. Joseph (Spanish: Concatedral de San José de Tadó) Also Tadó Cathedral is a cathedral of the Catholic Church under the invocation of St. Joseph. The building is located in the municipality of Tadó in the department of Chocó in the South American country of Colombia and is one of the episcopal headquarters of the Diocese of Istmina-Tadó along with the St. Paul Cathedral in Istmina.

The building was originally designed as a parish church, being elevated to the rank of co-cathedral on April 30, 1990, by Pope John Paul II, when the mentioned diocese is created, later, for its historical significance, architectural and cultural value was declared a Monument National by resolution No.0795 of July 31, 1998. In addition, the cathedral building underwent a total restoration between 1999 and 2006.

== See also ==
- Roman Catholicism in Colombia
- Co-Cathedral
- List of cathedrals in Colombia
