= Fidoloma =

Fidoloma (Latin: Dioecesis Fidolomensis) was an ancient Roman Catholic diocese located in present-day Algeria. The bishopric was founded in the Roman–Berber province of Mauretania Caesariensis, though the seat of the diocese is unknown.

== History ==
The bishopric was centered on a Roman town that flourished in late antiquity but did not last long after the Muslim conquest of the Maghreb and is now lost to history. The only known bishop of this diocese is Onesimo, who took part in the synod assembled in Carthage in 484 by the Vandal King Huneric, after which the Bishop was exiled. Today Fidoloma survives as a titular bishopric and the current bishop is Luis Alberto Cortés Rendon, auxiliary bishop of Pereira.

== Known bishops ==
1. Onesimo, fl. 484 AD.
2. Loras Joseph Watters (USA) 21 June 1965 – 8 January 1969
3. Bernard Mabula 9 January 1969 – 25 March 1972
4. Czesław Lewandowski of Włocławek 16 February 1973 – 16 August 2009
5. Ferenc Palánki 27 December 2010 – 21 September 2015
6. Luis Albeiro Cortés Rendón 30 November 2015 – 12 May 2022
