= Diocese of Málaga–Soatá =

Diocese of the Catholic Church in Colombia

Diocese of Málaga–Soatá Dioecesis Malagensis-Soatensis

Catholic

Location
- Country: Colombia
- Ecclesiastical province: Bucaramanga

Statistics
- Area: 7,466 km^{2} (2,883 sq mi)
- Population: Total; Catholics: (as of 2004); 171,110; 161,133 (94.2%)

Information
- Rite: Latin Rite
- Established: 7 July 1987 (39 years ago)
- Cathedral: Catedral de La Inmaculada Concepción in Málaga
- Co-cathedral: Co-Catedral de La Inmaculada Concepción in Soatá

Current leadership
- Pope: Leo XIV
- Bishop: Félix María Ramírez Barajas
- Metropolitan Archbishop: Ismael Rueda Sierra

Map

Website
- diocesismalagasoata.org

The Roman Catholic Diocese of Málaga–Soatá (Latin: Malagensis–Soatensis) is a diocese located in the cities of Málaga and Soatá in the ecclesiastical province of Bucaramanga in Colombia.

== History ==
- 7 July 1987: Established as Diocese of Málaga – Soatá from the Metropolitan Archdiocese of Bucaramanga and Diocese of Duitama.

== Bishops ==
=== Ordinaries ===
- Hernán Giraldo Jaramillo (1987.07.07 – 2001.01.19) Appointed, Bishop of Buga
- Darío de Jesús Monsalve Mejía (2001.07.25 – 2010.06.03) Appointed, Coadjutor Archbishop of Cali
- Víctor Manuel Ochoa Cadavid (2011.01.24 – 2015.07.24) Appointed, Bishop of Cúcuta
- José Libardo Garcés Monsalve (2016.06.29 - 2021.11.20)
- Félix Ramírez Barajas (2022.10.01 - present)

=== Another priest of this diocese who became bishop ===
- Hency Martínez Vargas, appointed Bishop of La Dorada-Guaduas in 2019

== See also ==
- Roman Catholicism in Colombia
