= Tibu =

Tibu may refer to:

- The Toubou people of the eastern Sahara
- Tibú, a city in Colombia
- Roman Catholic Diocese of Tibú, Colombia
