= Archdiocese of Bucaramanga =

Catholic archdiocese in Colombia

Coordinates: 7.1167°N 73.1167°W

Archdiocese of Bucaramanga Archidioecesis Bucaramanguensis

Catholic

Location
- Country: Colombia
- Ecclesiastical province: Bucaramanga

Statistics
- Area: 5,397 km^{2} (2,084 sq mi)
- Population: Total; Catholics: (as of 2004); 1,192,350; 1,168,525 (98.0%)

Information
- Rite: Latin Rite
- Established: 17 December 1952 (73 years ago)
- Cathedral: Catedral de la Sagrada Familia

Current leadership
- Pope: Leo XIV
- Archbishop: Luis Augusto Campos Flórez

Map

Website
- www.arquidiocesisbucaramanga.com

The Roman Catholic Archdiocese of Bucaramanga (Latin: Bucaramanguensis) is an archdiocese located in the city of Bucaramanga in Colombia.

== History ==
- 17 December 1952: Established as Diocese of Bucaramanga from the Diocese of Nueva Pamplona
- 14 December 1974: Promoted as Metropolitan Archdiocese of Bucaramanga

== Special churches ==
- Minor Basilicas:
  - St. John Baptist, Girón

== Bishops ==
=== Ordinaries ===
- Bishops of Bucaramanga
  - Aníbal Muñoz Duque (1952.12.18 – 1959.08.03) Appointed, Archbishop of Nueva Pamplona; future Cardinal
  - Héctor Rueda Hernández (1960.05.06 – 1974.12.14)
- Archbishops of Bucaramanga
  - Héctor Rueda Hernández (1974.12.14 – 1991.11.07) Appointed, Archbishop of Medellín
  - Darío Castrillón Hoyos (1992.12.16 – 1996.06.15) Appointed, Pro-Prefect of the Congregation for the Clergy; future Cardinal
  - Víctor Manuel López Forero (1998.06.27 – 2009.02.13)
  - Ismael Rueda Sierra (2009.02.13 – 2026.02.24)
  - Luis Augusto Campos Flórez (2026.02.24 – present)

=== Auxiliary bishops ===
- Isaías Duarte Cancino (1985-1988), appointed Bishop of Apartadó
- Héctor Cubillos Peña (2002-2004), appointed Bishop of Zipaquirá
- Juan Vicente Córdoba Villota, S.J. (2004-2011), appointed Bishop of Fontibón

=== Other priests of this diocese who became bishops ===
- Rafael Sarmiento Peralta, appointed Bishop of Ocaña in 1962
- Carlos Prada Sanmiguel, appointed Auxiliary Bishop of Medellín in 1988
- Jorge Enrique Lozano Zafra, appointed Bishop of Ocaña in 1993
- Hency Martínez Vargas (priest here, 1985-1987), appointed Bishop of La Dorada-Guaduas in 2019

== Suffragan dioceses ==
- Barrancabermeja
- Málaga–Soatá
- Socorro y San Gil
- Vélez

== See also ==
- Roman Catholicism in Colombia
