= Mosé Higuera =

Colombian prelate

The Most Reverend Mosé Higuera
- Auxiliary Bishop of Medellín
- Church: Catholic Church
- Diocese: Medellín
- Appointed: 4 March 1884 by Pope Leo XIII
- Term ended: 25 September 1915
- Previous post: Auxiliary Bishop of Bogotá (1876–84)

Orders
- Ordination: c. 1869
- Consecration: 19 May 1878 by Vicente Arbeláez Gómez

Personal details
- Born: 20 December 1842 Tibasosa, Tunja, New Granada
- Died: 25 September 1915 (aged 72) Medellín, Antioquia, Colombia

Ordination history of Mosé Higuera
History
Episcopal consecration
- Principal consecrator: Vicente Arbeláez Gómez
- Co-consecrators: Bonifacio Antonio Toscano

Mosé Higuera (20 December 1842 – 25 September 1915) was a Colombian prelate of the Catholic Church. He served as an auxiliary bishop of two dioceses, first for the Archdiocese of Bogotá from 1876 to 1884, and next for the Archdiocese of Medellín from 1884 until his death.

== Biography ==
Higuera was born on 20 December 1842 in Tibasosa, Tunja Province, Republic of New Granada (today located in Boyacá Department, Colombia). He was ordained a priest c. 1869. On 7 April 1876, he was appointed Titular Bishop of Maximianopolis in Arabia and Auxiliary Bishop of the Archdiocese of Santafé en Nueva Granada (today the Archdiocese of Bogotá). His episcopal consecration was held on 19 May 1878 in the Primatial Cathedral in Bogotá, with Archbishop Vicente Arbeláez Gómez serving as principal consecrator, and Auxiliary Bishop Bonifacio Antonio Toscano serving as co-consecrator.

On 4 March 1884, Higuera was appointed Auxiliary Bishop of the Diocese of Medellín by Pope Leo XIII. He served in that capacity until 25 September 1915, when he died in Medellín at the age of 72.

During his time as bishop, Higuera was the co-consecrator of a number of bishops. They are listed as follows, with the year of consecration parenthesized: Severo Garcia (1882), Juan Nepomuceno Rueda Rueda (1882), Bernardo Herrera Restrepo (1885), José Benigo Perilla y Martínez (1887), Joaquín Pardo y Vergara (1892), Eduardo Maldonado Calvo (1905), Atanasio María Vicente Soler y Royo, OFMCap (1907), Manuel Antonio Arboleda y Scarpetta, CM (1907), and Francisco Cristóbal Toro (1911).

== Episcopal lineage ==
Higuera's episcopal lineage is as follows:

- Cardinal Scipione Rebiba
- Cardinal Giulio Antonio Santorio (1566)
- Cardinal Girolamo Bernerio, OP (1586)
- Archbishop Galeazzo Sanvitale (1604)
- Cardinal Ludovico Ludovisi (1621)
- Cardinal Luigi Caetani (1622)
- Cardinal Ulderico Carpegna (1630)
- Cardinal Paluzzo Paluzzi Altieri degli Albertoni (1666)
- Pope Benedict XIII (1675)
- Pope Benedict XIV (1724)
- Archbishop Enrico Enríquez (1743)
- Bishop Manuel Quintano Bonifaz (1749)
- Cardinal Francisco Antonio de Lorenzana (1765)
- Bishop Atanasio Puyal y Poveda (1790)
- Bishop Andrés Esteban y Gómez (1815)
- Bishop Salvador Jiménez y Padilla (1816)
- Bishop Jose Antonio Chaves, OFM (1834)
- Bishop Bernabé Rojas, OP (1855)
- Bishop Domingo Antonio Riaño Martínez (1855)
- Archbishop Antonio Herrán y Zaldúa (1855)
- Archbishop Vicente Arbeláez Gómez (1860)
- Bishop Mosé Higuera (1878)
