= Luis Albeiro Cortés Rendón =

Colombian Roman Catholic bishop (1952–2022)

His Excellency Luis Albeiro Cortés Rendón
- Auxiliary Bishop of Pereira
- Diocese: Pereira
- Appointed: 30 November 2015
- Term ended: 12 May 2022
- Other post: Titular Bishop of Fidoloma (2015–2022)
- Previous post: Bishop of Vélez (2003–2015)

Orders
- Ordination: 8 December 1978
- Consecration: 27 June 2003 by Beniamino Stella

Personal details
- Born: 2 February 1952 Quimbaya, Quindío, Colombia
- Died: 12 May 2022 (aged 70) Pereira, Colombia

Luis Alberio Cortés Rendón (2 February 1952 – 12 May 2022) was a Colombian Roman Catholic prelate.

Cortès Rendón was born in Quimbaya, Quindío, Colombia. He served as bishop of the Roman Catholic Diocese of Vélez, Colombia, from 2003 to 2015. He then served as titular bishop of Fidoloma and auxiliary bishop of the Roman Catholic Diocese of Pereira Colombia from 2015 until his death.

Catholic Church titles
Preceded by —	Auxiliary Bishop of Pereira; 2015–2022	Succeeded by —
Preceded by Ferenc Palánki	Titular Bishop of Fidoloma; 2015–2022	Succeeded by Sede vacante
Preceded by Post created	Bishop of Vélez; 2003–2015	Succeeded by Marco Antonio Merchán Ladino
