= Diocese of Caldas =

Diocese of the Catholic Church in Colombia

Coordinates: 6.0918°N 75.6363°W

Diocese of Caldas Dioecesis Caldensis

Catholic

Location
- Country: Colombia
- Ecclesiastical province: Medellín

Statistics
- Area: 1,250 km^{2} (480 sq mi)
- Population: Total; Catholics: (as of 2004); 222,400; 211,400 (95.1%)

Information
- Denomination: Catholic Church
- Sui iuris church: Latin Church
- Rite: Roman Rite
- Established: 15 June 1987 (39 years ago)
- Cathedral: Catedral de Nuestra Señora de las Mercedes

Current leadership
- Pope: Leo XIV
- Bishop: Juan Fernando Franco Sánchez
- Bishops emeritus: José Soleibe Arbeláez

Map

Website
- www.diocesisdecaldas.org

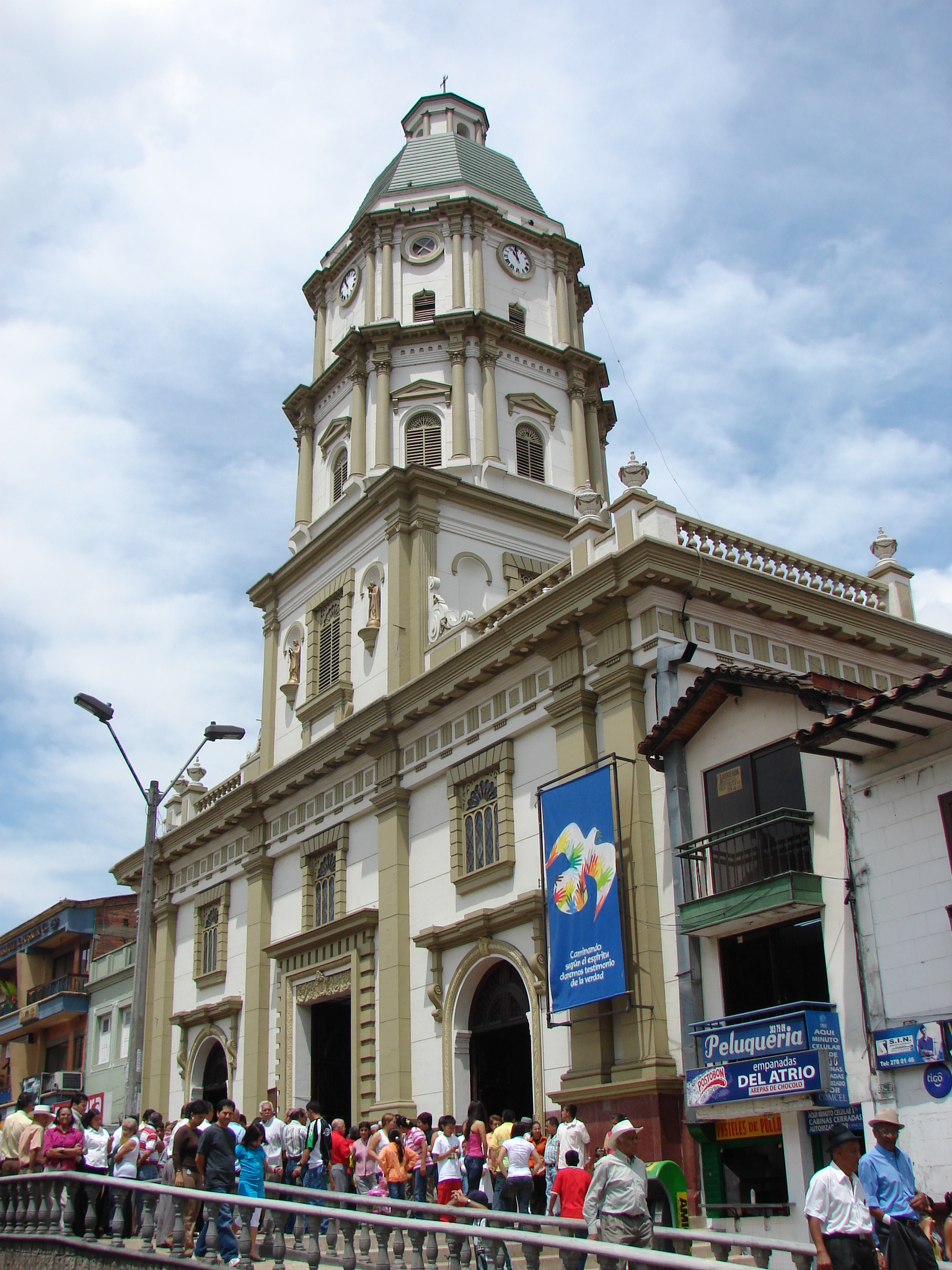
Cathedral of Our Lady of Mercies

The Diocese of Caldas (Latin: Caldensis) is a Latin Church ecclesiastical territory or diocese in Colombia. The episcopal see is the city of Caldas. The Diocese of Caldas is a suffragan diocese in the ecclesiastical province of the metropolitan Archdiocese of Medellín. The Bishop of the Diocese of Caldas is Juan Fernando Franco Sánchez.

== History ==
- 18 June 1988: Established as Diocese of Caldas from the Metropolitan Archdiocese of Medellín

== Bishops ==
=== Ordinaries ===
- Germán Garcia Isaza, C.M. (1988.06.18 – 2002.03.01) Appointed, Bishop of Apartadó
- José Soleibe Arbeláez (2002.12.06 – 2015.01.28)
- César Alcides Balbín Tamayo (2015.01.28 – 2021.10.19) Appointed, Bishop of Cartago
- Juan Fernando Franco Sánchez (2021.12.16 – ...)

=== Other priest of this diocese who became bishop ===
- Fidel León Cadavid Marin, appointed Bishop of Quibdó in 2001

== See also ==
- Roman Catholicism in Colombia
