= Jorge Iván Castaño Rubio =

Colombian Roman Catholic bishop (1935–2025)

His Excellency Jorge Iván Castaño Rubio
- Auxiliary Bishop Emeritus of Medellín; Titular Bishop of Stagnum
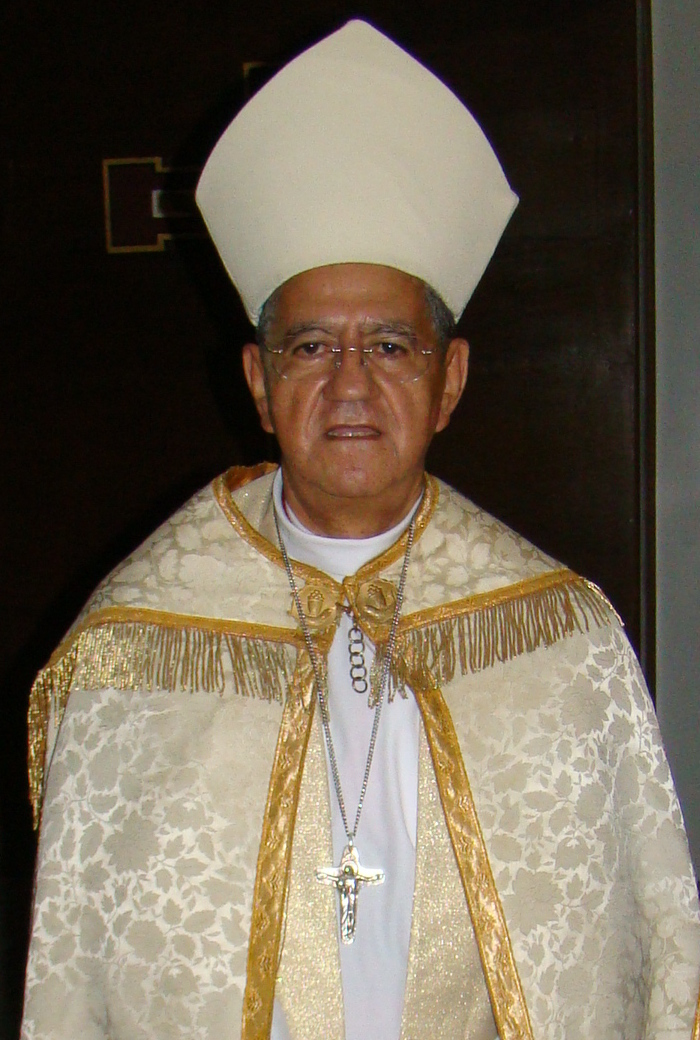
- Castaño Rubio in 2010
- Archdiocese: Medellín
- Appointed: 16 February 2001
- Term ended: 25 November 2010
- Other post: Titular Bishop of Stagnum (2001–2025)
- Previous posts: Apostolic Vicar of Quibdó and Titular Bishop of Edistiana (1983–1990); Bishop of Quibdó (1990–2001)

Orders
- Ordination: 27 August 1961
- Consecration: 6 August 1983 by Angelo Acerbi

Personal details
- Born: 25 November 1935 Montebello, Antioquia, Colombia
- Died: 2 May 2025 (aged 89) Medellín, Colombia

Jorge Iván Castaño Rubio (25 November 1935 – 2 May 2025) was a Colombian prelate of the Roman Catholic Church.

== Biography ==
Born in Montebello, Antioquia, Castaño Rubio was ordained to the priesthood in 1961. He received a doctorate in theology from the Pontifical University of Saint Thomas Aquinas in Rome. In June 1983, he was appointed vicar apostolic of Quibdó and titular bishop of Edistiana, serving until he was ordained bishop of Quibdó in 1990. In 2001, he was appointed auxiliary bishop of Medellín and titular bishop of Stagnum. Castaño Rubio retired from his post as auxiliary bishop on his 75th birthday in 2010.

Castaño Rubio died in Medellín on 2 May 2025, at the age of 89.

Catholic Church titles
Preceded by —	Auxiliary Bishop of Medellín; 2001–2010	Succeeded by —
Preceded by Curtis J. Guillory	Titular Bishop of Stagnum; 2001–2025	Succeeded by Vacant
Preceded by Pedro Grau y Arola	Bishop of Quibdó; 1990–2001	Succeeded by Fidel León Cadavid Marin
Preceded by Pavao Žanić	Titular Bishop of Edistiana; 1983–1990	Succeeded by Johannes Kreidler
