= Gonzalo de Jesús Rivera Gómez =

Colombian Roman Catholic auxiliary bishop (1933–2019)

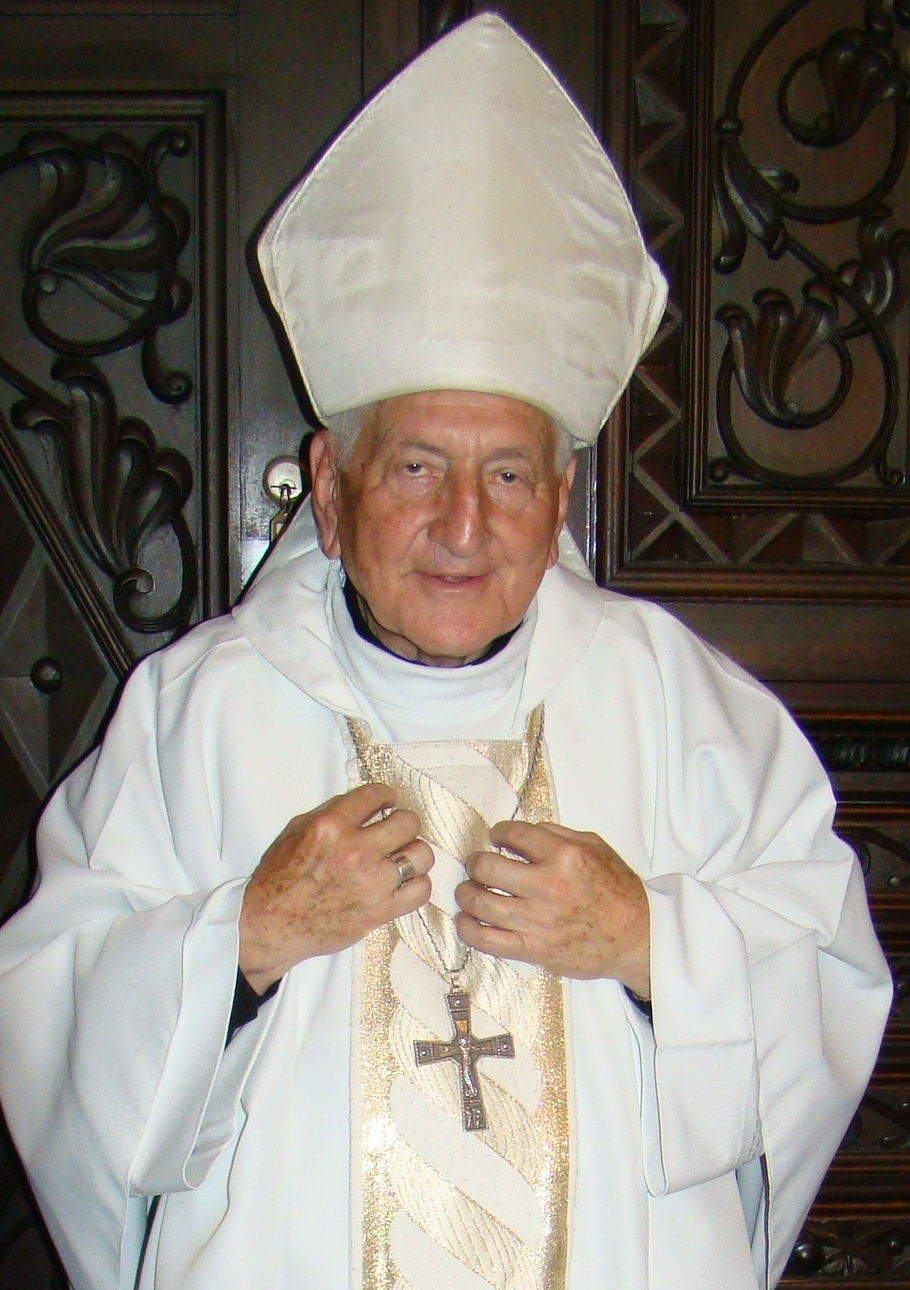
Gonzalo de Jesus Rivera Gomez

Gonzalo de Jesús Rivera Gómez (3 November 1933 – 20 October 2019) was a Colombian Roman Catholic auxiliary bishop.

Rivera Gómez was born in Colombia and ordained to the priesthood in 1960. He served as titular bishop of Bennefa and as auxiliary bishop of the Roman Catholic Archdiocese of Medellín, Colombia, from 1988 to 2010.
