= Rodrigo Arango Velásquez =

Colombian bishop

Rodrigo Arango Velásquez PSS
- Bishop of Buga
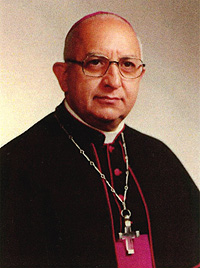
- Church: Catholic Church
- Diocese: Diocese of Buga
- In office: 17 January 1985 – 19 January 2001
- Predecessor: Julián Mendoza Guerrero
- Successor: Hernán Giraldo Jaramillo
- Previous posts: Titular Bishop of Casae in Numidia (1981-1985); Auxiliary Bishop of Medellín (1981-1985)

Orders
- Ordination: 3 June 1950
- Consecration: 25 March 1981 by Alfonso López Trujillo

Personal details
- Born: 4 March 1925 Betania, Antioquia Department, Colombia
- Died: 27 December 2008 (aged 83)

Rodrigo Arango Velásquez (4 March 1925 – 27 December 2008) was the second Catholic Bishop of the Diocese of Buga, Colombia. He was the first Colombian Bishop of the Sulpician order.

Born in Betania, Colombia, he was ordained to the priesthood on 3 June 1950. On 29 January 1981, Pope John Paul II appointed him auxiliary bishop of the Roman Catholic Archdiocese of Medellín, Colombia and he was ordained a bishop on 25 March 1981. On 17 January 1985, Pope John Paul II appointed him Bishop of the Diocese of Buga. He retired on 19 January 2001.
