= St. Peter the Apostle Cathedral, Buga =

St. Peter the Apostle Cathedral
- Catedral de San Pedro Apóstol
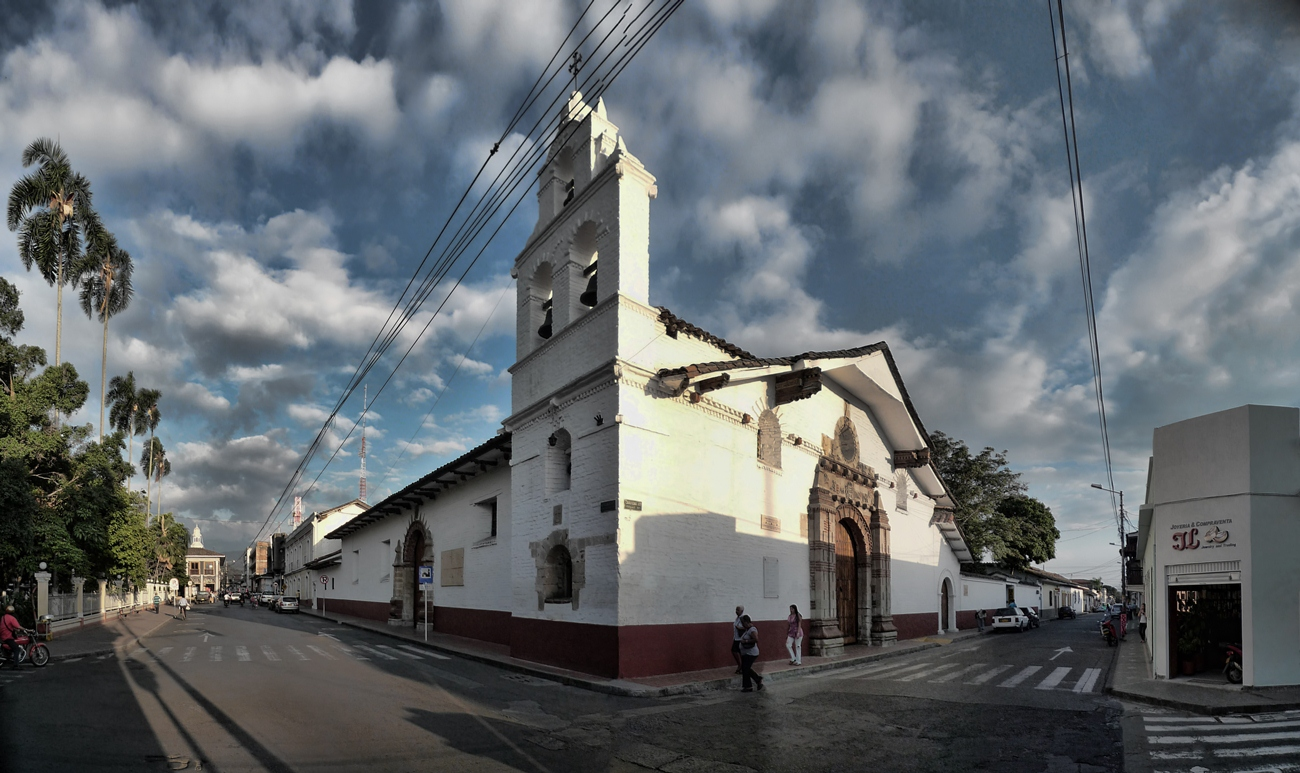
- St. Peter the Apostle Cathedral
- 3°53′58″N 76°18′09″W
- Location: Buga
- Country: Colombia
- Denomination: Roman Catholic Church

The St. Peter the Apostle Cathedral (Spanish: Catedral de San Pedro Apóstol) or Buga Cathedral is the cathedral of the Roman Catholic Diocese of Buga and located in Guadalajara de Buga (Valle del Cauca) in the South American country of Colombia, built under the invocation of the Apostle Simon Peter, which is the seat of the bishop of Buga, being the largest church of the homonymous diocese. It is located in a corner, at the junction of 6th Street (Main Church Street or 7 August) with Carrera 15 (Bolivar Street), in Zone 1 (Foundational Area) of the Historical Center of Buga, in The south side of the José María Cabal Park, three blocks from the Lesser Basilica of the Lord of Miracles.

The floor of the nave is separated from the wooden pillars. On the right nave there is the stone baptismal font and the main altar, the work of Sebastián Usiña from Popayán, covered in gold and silver leaflets.

The church that is currently the cathedral belonged to the Jesuits, but when they were expelled, the church was abandoned, which was enlarged and ornamented over the years, was destroyed in 1766 due to a seismic movement. Nine years later, with the financial help of the King of Spain, it was rebuilt; Reconstruction that was terminated on December 30, 1781, and then restored in the twentieth century. With the creation of the Diocese of Buga, it was elevated to the rank of cathedral

== See also ==
- Roman Catholicism in Colombia
- St. Peter the Apostle

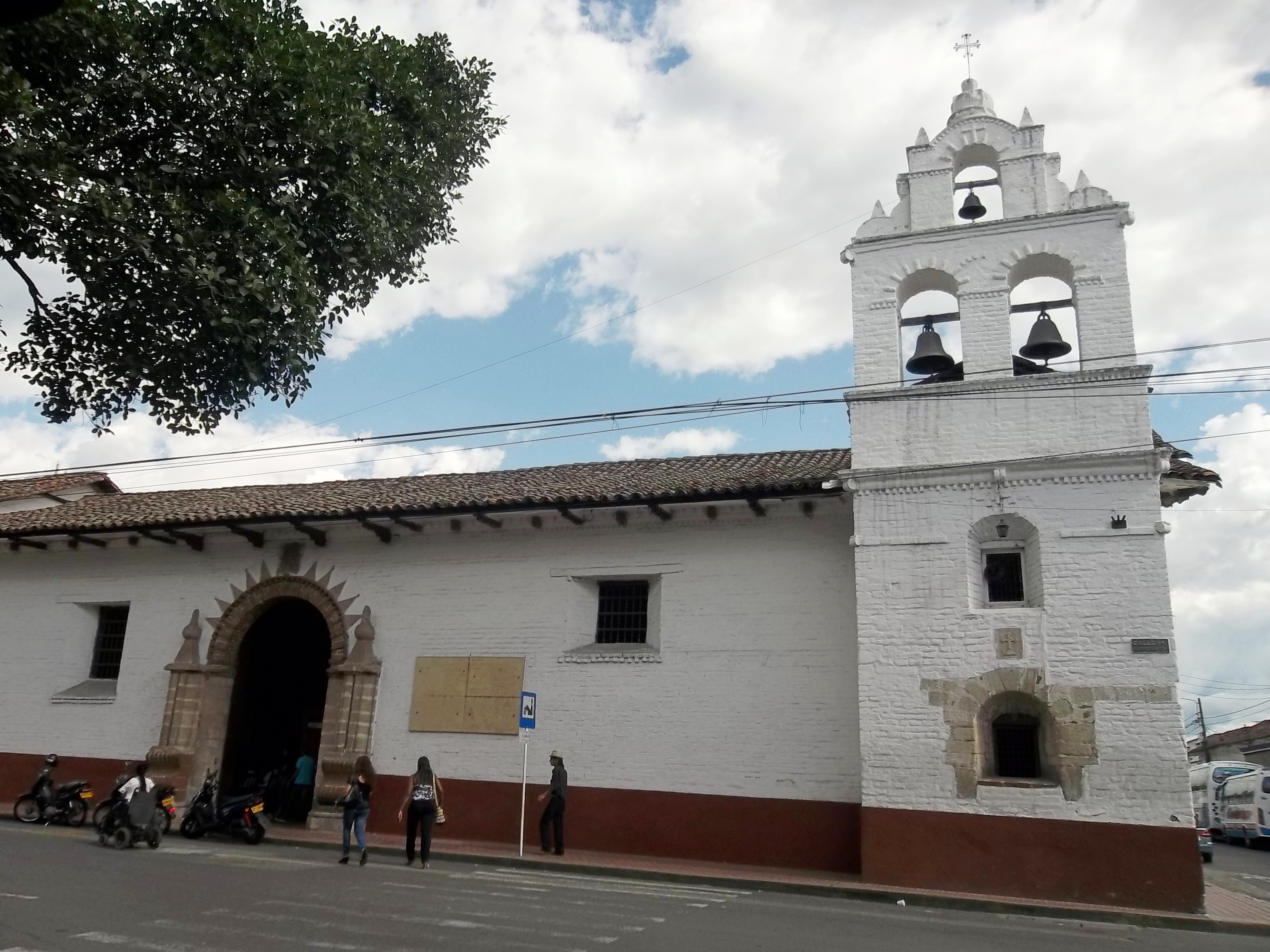
Another View
