= Diocese of Pereira =

Diocese of the Catholic Church in Colombia

Diocese of Pereira Dioecesis Pereiranus

Catholic

Location
- Country: Colombia
- Ecclesiastical province: Manizales

Statistics
- Area: 6,126 km^{2} (2,365 sq mi)
- Population: Total; Catholics: (as of 2004); 1,200,000; 900,000 (75.0%)

Information
- Rite: Latin Rite
- Established: 17 December 1952 (73 years ago)
- Cathedral: Catedral de Nuestra Señora de la Pobreza

Current leadership
- Pope: Leo XIV
- Bishop: Nelson Jaír Cardona Ramírez
- Metropolitan Archbishop: Gonzalo Restrepo Restrepo
- Bishops emeritus: Tulio Duque Gutiérrez,S.D.S., Rigoberto Corredor Bermúdez

Map

Website
- www.diocesisdepereira.org.co

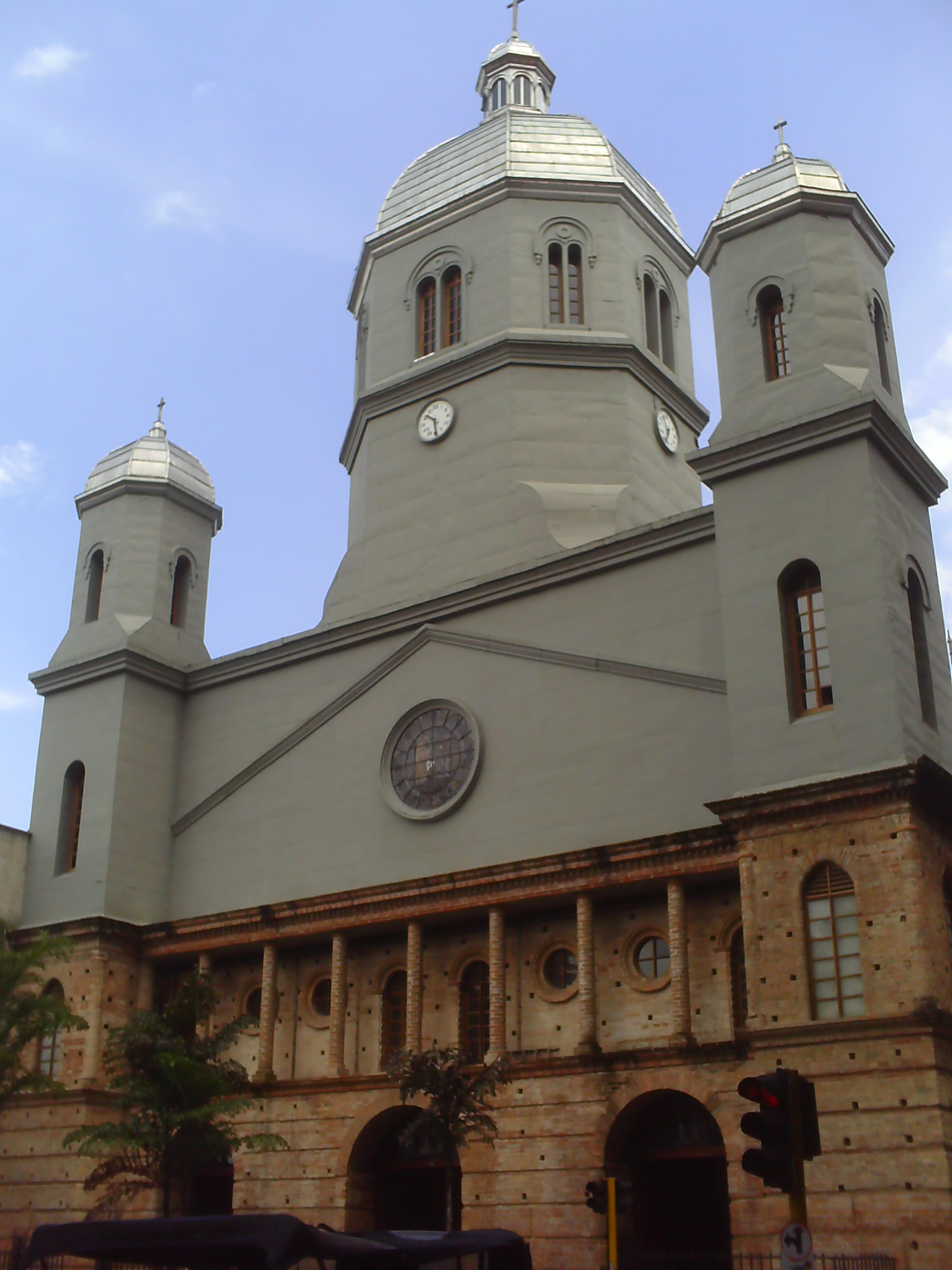
Cathedral of Our Lady of Poverty

The Roman Catholic Diocese of Pereira (Latin: Diocesis Pereiranus) is a diocese located in the city of Pereira in the ecclesiastical province of Manizales in Colombia.

== History ==
- 17 December 1952: Established as Diocese of Pereira from the Diocese of Manizales and Apostolic Prefecture of Chocó

== Bishops ==
=== Ordinaries ===
- Baltasar Alvarez Restrepo (1952.12.18 – 1976.07.01)
- Darío Castrillón Hoyos (1976.07.01 – 1992.12.16) Appointed, Archbishop of Bucaramanga; future Cardinal
- Fabio Suescún Mutis (1993.11.20 – 2001.01.19) Appointed, Bishop of Colombia, Military
- Tulio Duque Gutiérrez, S.D.S. (2001.07.25 – 2011.07.15)
- Rigoberto Corredor Bermúdez (2011.07.15 – present)

=== Coadjutor bishop ===
- Darío Castrillón Hoyos (1971-1976); future Cardinal

=== Auxiliary bishops ===
- Rigoberto Corredor Bermúdez (1988-1996), appointed Bishop of Buenaventura (later returned here as Bishop)
- Hernán Giraldo Jaramillo (1984-1987), appointed Bishop of Málaga-Soatá
- Luis Albeiro Cortés Rendón (2015-2022)

=== Other priests of this diocese who became bishops ===
- Julio Hernando García Peláez, appointed Auxiliary Bishop of Cali in 2005
- Rubén Darío Jaramillo Montoya, appointed Bishop of Buenaventura in 2017

== See also ==
- Roman Catholicism in Colombia
