= Gustavo Martínez Frías =

- Archbishop of Nueva Pamplona
- Church: Catholic Church
- Archdiocese: Archdiocese of Nueva Pamplona
- In office: 18 March 1999 – 29 August 2009
- Predecessor: Víctor Manuel López Forero
- Successor: Luis Madrid Merlano
- Previous post: Bishop of Ipiales (1987-1999)

Orders
- Ordination: 27 March 1960
- Consecration: 20 February 1987 by Héctor Rueda Hernández

Personal details
- Born: 30 May 1935 Bucaramanga, Santander Department, Colombia
- Died: 29 August 2009 (aged 74)

Gustavo Martínez Frías (30 May 1935 – 29 August 2009) was the Archbishop of Nueva Pamplona, Colombia. Martínez Frías was appointed Archbishop of Nueva Pamplona by Pope John Paul II on 18 March 1999 and installed on 6 May 1999. He remained archbishop until his death on 29 August 2009, at the age of 74.

Gustavo Martínez Frías was born in Bucaramanga, Colombia, on 30 May 1935. He was ordained a Catholic priest for the diocese of Socorro y San Gil on 27 November 1960. Martínez Frías served as the bishop of the Roman Catholic Diocese of Ipiales from 1987 until 1999, prior to becoming the Archbishop of Nueva Pamplona.

His family was from Province of Santander, San Vicente de Chucuri (his grand father died during La Violencia), his father was don Gustavo Martínez (a blacksmith) and his mother Guillermina Frías (owner of a small store in the main plaza of San Vicente). He was the eldest brother of Alix, Leonor, Hernán, Eduardo and Leonardo (1957–1997) who lived and studied in Paris (1976-1990) and in Rome (1992-1995).
