= Jaime Prieto Amaya =

Roman Catholic bishop

- Bishop of Cúcuta
- Church: Catholic Church
- Diocese: Diocese of Cúcuta
- In office: 1 December 2008 – 25 August 2010
- Predecessor: Oscar Urbina Ortega
- Successor: Julio César Vidal Ortiz
- Previous post: Bishop of Barrancabermeja (1993-2008)

Orders
- Ordination: 14 August 1965
- Consecration: 11 December 1993 by Paolo Romeo

Personal details
- Born: 27 March 1941 Bogotá, Colombia
- Died: 25 August 2010 (aged 69)

Jaime Prieto Amaya (27 March 1941 – 25 August 2010) was the Roman Catholic bishop of the Roman Catholic Diocese of Cúcuta, Colombia.

Ordained in 1965, he became bishop in 1993 and in 2008 was appointed bishop of the Cúcuta Diocese.
