= Diocese of Socorro y San Gil =

Diocese of the Catholic Church in Colombia

Diocese of Socorro y San Gil Dioecesis Succursensis et Sancti Aegidii Diócesis de Socorro y San Gil

Catholic

Location
- Country: Colombia
- Metropolitan: Archdiocese of Bucaramanga
- Headquarters: San Gil, Santander Department, Colombia

Statistics
- Area: 6,734 km^{2} (2,600 sq mi)
- Population: Total; Catholics: (as of 2023); 242,725; 228,900 (94.3%)
- Parishes: 53

Information
- Denomination: Catholic Church
- Sui iuris church: Latin Church
- Rite: Roman Rite
- Established: 20 March 1895; 131 years ago
- Cathedral: Catedral de La Santa Cruz in San Gil
- Co-cathedral: Catedral de Nuestra Señora del Socorro in Socorro
- Secular priests: 117 (110 Diocesan, 7 Religious Orders)

Current leadership
- Pope: Leo XIV
- Bishop: Sede vacante
- Metropolitan Archbishop: Luis Augusto Campos Flórez
- Apostolic Administrator: Luis Augusto Campos Flórez
- Bishops emeritus: Carlos Germán Mesa Ruiz

Map

Website
- www.diocesisdesocorroysangil.org

The Roman Catholic Diocese of Socorro y San Gil (Latin: Succursensis et Sancti Aegidii) is a diocese located in the cities of Socorro and San Gil in the ecclesiastical province of Bucaramanga in Colombia.

== History ==
- 20 March 1895: Established as Diocese of Socorro from the Diocese of Nueva Pamplona
- 19 January 1928: Renamed as Diocese of Socorro y San Gil

== Ordinaries ==
=== Bishops of Socorro ===
- Evaristo Blanco (19 April 1897 – 27 March 1909), appointed Bishop of Nueva Pamplona
- Francisco Cristóbal Toro Correa (18 October 1910 – 16 December 1913), appointed Bishop of Santa Marta
- Antonio Vicente Arenas y Rueda (28 May 1914 – 19 July 1922)
- Leonidas Medina (7 March 1923 – 19 January 1928 see below)

=== Bishops of Socorro y San Gil ===
- Leonidas Medina (see above 19 January 1928 – 19 July 1947), retired
- Ángel María Ocampo Berrio, S.J. (19 July 1947 – 6 December 1950), appointed Bishop of Tunja
- Aníbal Muñoz Duque (8 April 1951 – 18 December 1952), appointed Bishop of Bucaramanga
- Pedro José Rivera Mejía (20 February 1953 – 25 October 1975), resigned
- Ciro Alfonso Gómez Serrano (25 October 1975 – 19 January 1980)
- Víctor Manuel López Forero (6 December 1980 – 7 June 1985), appointed Military Ordinary of Colombia
- Jorge Leonardo Gómez Serna, O.P. (6 March 1986 – 7 June 1985), appointed Bishop of Magangué
- Ismael Rueda Sierra (27 June 2003 – 13 February 2009), appointed Archbishop of Bucaramanga
- Carlos Germán Mesa Ruiz (2 February 2010 – 12 December 2019), retired
- Luis Augusto Campos Flórez (12 December 2019 – 24 February 2026), appointed Archbishop of Bucaramanga
  - Apostolic Administrator Luis Augusto Campos Flórez (18 April 2026 – Present), Archbishop of Bucaramanga

=== Coadjutor bishops ===
- Ángel María Ocampo Berrio, S.J. (1942-1947), succeeded
- Ciro Alfonso Gómez Serrano (1972-1975), succeeded

=== Other priests of this diocese who became bishops ===
- Rafael Afanador y Cadena (1898-1916), appointed Bishop of Nueva Pamplona in 1916
- José Joaquín Flórez Hernández (1940-1955), appointed Bishop of Duitama in 1955
- José de Jesús Pimiento Rodriguez (1941-1955), appointed Auxiliary Bishop of Pasto in 1955
- Gustavo Martínez Frías (1960-1987), appointed Bishop of Ipiales in 1987
- Luis José Rueda Aparicio (1989-2012), appointed Bishop of Montelibano in 2012

== See also ==
- Roman Catholicism in Colombia
