= Diocese of Buga =

Diocese of the Catholic Church in Colombia

Coordinates: 3.8993°N 76.3027°W

Diocese of Buga Dioecesis Buguensis

Catholic

Location
- Country: Colombia
- Ecclesiastical province: Cali

Statistics
- Area: 3,997 km^{2} (1,543 sq mi)
- Population: Total; Catholics: (as of 2004); 569,127; 491,127 (86.3%)

Information
- Rite: Latin Rite
- Established: 29 June 1966 (60 years ago)
- Cathedral: St. Peter the Apostle Cathedral

Current leadership
- Pope: Leo XIV
- Bishop: Alexander Matiz Atencio
- Metropolitan Archbishop: Luis Fernando Rodríguez Velásquez
- Bishops emeritus: Hernán Giraldo Jaramillo, Jose Roberto Ospina Leongomez

Map

Website
- www.diocesisdebuga.org

The Roman Catholic Diocese of Buga (Latin: Buguensis) is a diocese located in the city of Buga in the ecclesiastical province of Cali in Colombia.

== History ==
- 29 June 1966: Established as Diocese of Buga from the Metropolitan Archdiocese of Cali and Diocese of Palmira

== Special churches ==
- Minor Basilicas:
  - Basílica del Señor de los Milagros de Buga

== Ordinaries ==
1. Julián Mendoza Guerrero (1967.01.03 – 1984.08.04)
2. Rodrigo Arango Velásquez, P.S.S. (1985.01.17 – 2001.01.19)
3. Hernán Giraldo Jaramillo (2001.01.19 – 2012.05.10)
4. Jose Roberto Ospina Leongomez (2012.05.10 – 2024.12.07)
5. Alexander Matiz Atencio (2024.12.07 – present)

== See also ==
- Roman Catholicism in Colombia
