= Alberto Giraldo Jaramillo =

Colombian archbishop (1934–2021)

Alberto Giraldo Jaramillo PSS
- Archbishop of Medellín
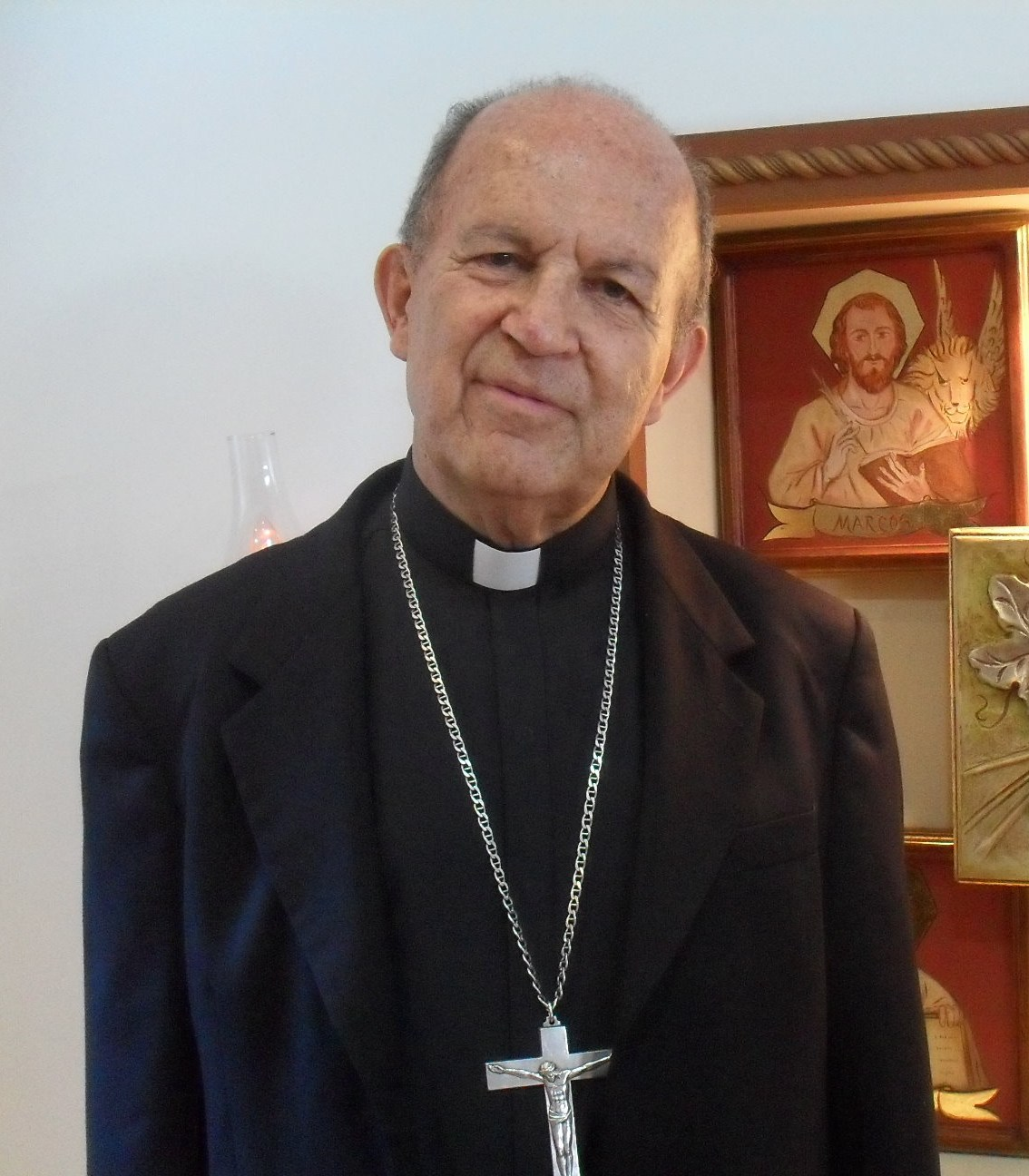
- Jaramillo in 2010
- Church: Catholic Church
- Archdiocese: Archdiocese of Medellín
- In office: 13 February 1997 – 16 February 2010
- Predecessor: Héctor Rueda Hernández
- Successor: Ricardo Tobón Restrepo
- Previous posts: Archbishop of Popayán (1990-1997); Bishop of Cúcuta (1983-1990); Bishop of Chiquinquirá (1977-1983); Titular Bishop of Obba (1974-1977); Auxiliary Bishop of Popayán (1974-1977)

Orders
- Ordination: 9 November 1958 by Luis Concha Córdoba
- Consecration: 15 September 1974 by Aníbal Muñoz Duque

Personal details
- Born: 7 October 1934 Manizales, Caldas Department, Colombia
- Died: 21 July 2021 (aged 86) Pereira, Risaralda Department, Colombia

Alberto Giraldo Jaramillo PSS (October 7, 1934 – July 21, 2021) was a Colombian Roman Catholic priest, prelate, and member of the Society of the Priests of Saint Sulpice. Giraldo served as the first Bishop of the Diocese of Chiquinquirá from its creation on April 26, 1977, until July 26, 1983, and the Bishop of the Diocese of Cúcuta from 1983 to 1990. He was then appointed Archbishop of the Archdiocese of Popayán from 1990 to 1997 and Archbishop of the Archdiocese of Medellín from February 1997 until his retirement in February 2010. He was also President of the Episcopal Conference of Colombia from July 1996 to July 2002.

Giraldo was born in Manizales on October 7, 1934. He was ordained a Catholic priest on November 9, 1958, and joined the Society of the Priests of Saint Sulpice in 1960. He studied theology at the University of Montreal in Canada and received a doctorate in theological studies from the Pontifical University of Saint Thomas Aquinas in Italy.

Giraldo was archbishop of Medellín from 1997 to 2010 during the height of the Colombian conflict. Alirio Uribe Muñoz, a human rights activist and politician, praised Giraldo as "committed 100% to peace and human rights in Medellín and Colombia" during the conflict.

Alberto Giraldo Jaramillo died at the San Jorge de Pereira Hospital in Pereira, Colombia, on July 21, 2021, at the age of 87.
