= Alonso Llano Ruiz =

- Bishop of Istmina–Tadó
- Church: Catholic Church
- Diocese: Diocese of Istmina–Tadó
- In office: 5 May 1993 – 5 June 2010
- Predecessor: Gustavo Posada Peláez
- Successor: Julio Hernando García Peláez

Orders
- Ordination: 6 January 1973
- Consecration: 29 May 1993 by Paolo Romeo

Personal details
- Born: 19 June 1931 Marulanda, Caldas Department, Colombia
- Died: 26 March 2015 (aged 83)

Alonso Llano Ruiz (19 June 1931 – 26 March 2015) was a Colombian Roman Catholic bishop.

Ordained to the priesthood in 1973, Llano Ruiz was appointed bishop of the Diocese of Istmina–Tadó, Colombia and retired in 2010.
