= Darío Castrillón Hoyos =

Colombian cardinal

His Eminence Darío Castrillón Hoyos
- Prefect Emeritus of the Congregation for the Clergy
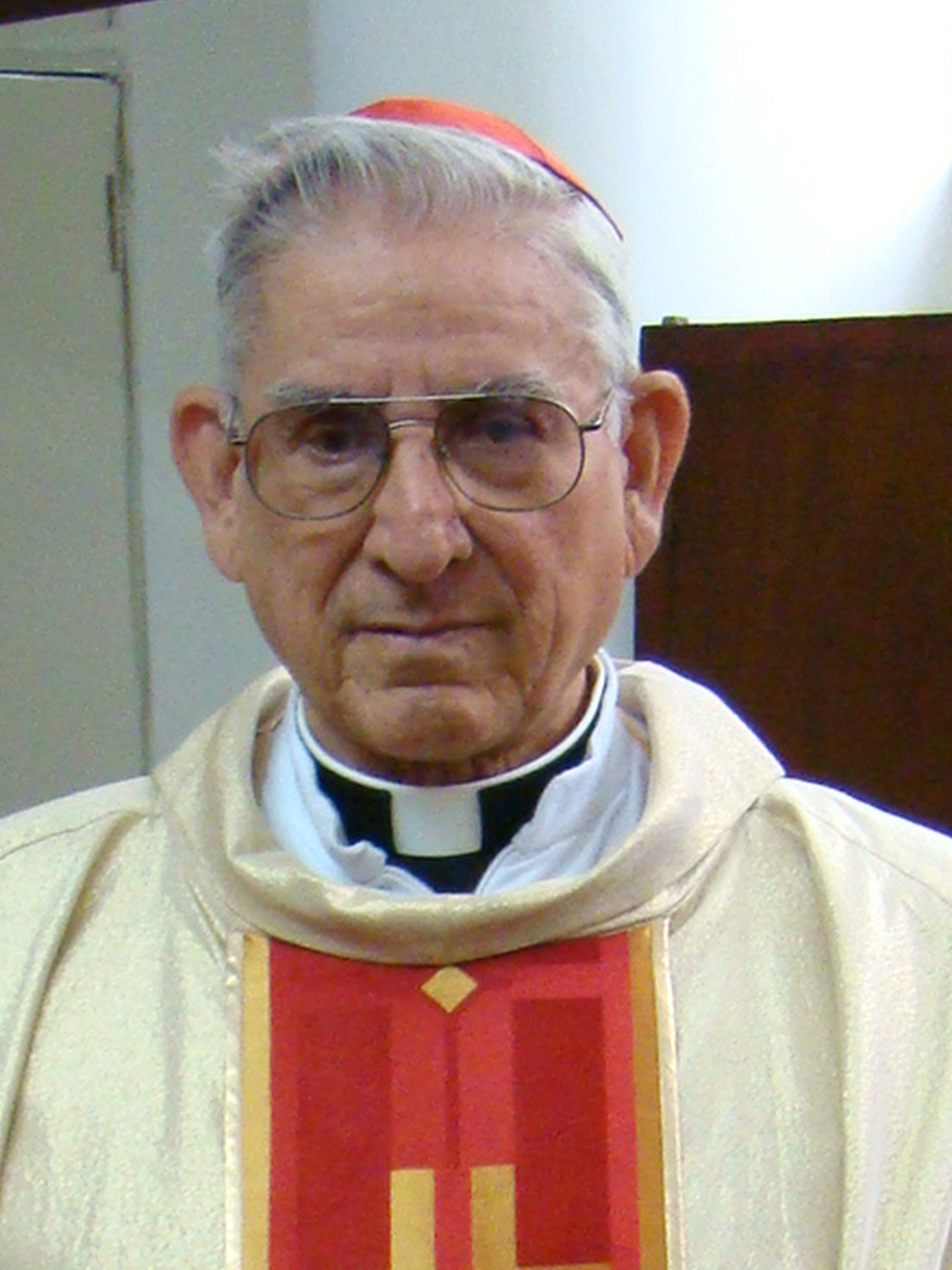
- Cardinal Castrillón Hoyos in 2008
- Appointed: 15 June 1996
- Term ended: 31 October 2006
- Predecessor: Jose Tomas Sanchez
- Successor: Cláudio Hummes
- Other post: Cardinal-Priest of SS. Nome di Maria al Foro Traiano
- Previous posts: Coadjutor Bishop of Pereira (1971); Titular Bishop of Villa Regis (1971); Bishop of Pereira (1976–1991); Archbishop of Bucaramanga (1991–1996); Prefect of the Congregation for the Clergy (1996–2006); President of the Pontifical Commission Ecclesia Dei (2000–2009)

Orders
- Ordination: 26 October 1952 by Alfonso Carinci
- Consecration: 18 July 1971 by Angelo Palmas
- Created cardinal: 21 February 1998 by Pope John Paul II
- Rank: Cardinal-Priest

Personal details
- Born: 4 July 1929 Medellín, Colombia
- Died: 18 May 2018 (aged 88) Rome, Italy
- Denomination: Catholic
- Motto: Latin: Christus in vobis spes gloriae, lit. 'Christ in you, the hope of glory'

- Coat of arms

Darío del Niño Jesús Castrillón Hoyos (4 July 1929 – 18 May 2018) was a Colombian cardinal of the Catholic Church. He was Prefect of the Congregation for the Clergy from 1996 to 2006 and President of the Pontifical Commission Ecclesia Dei from 2000 until his retirement in 2009. He was made a cardinal in 1998.

== Early life ==
Born in Medellín, Colombia, Castrillón Hoyos attended the seminaries in Antioquia and Santa Rosa de Osos before studying at the Pontifical Gregorian University in Rome. He was ordained to the priesthood by Archbishop Alfonso Carinci on 26 October 1952. He obtained a doctorate in canon law and specialization in religious sociology, political economics, and ethical economics from the Gregorian. Castrillón Hoyos also studied at the Sociology Faculty of the University of Louvain in Belgium.

Upon returning to Colombia, he served as a curate for two rural parishes in Yarumal from 1954 to 1971. He then served as director of Cursillos, of the national pastoral program, and of the Legion of Mary. After becoming an official in the diocesan curia of Santa Rosa de Osos, Castrillón was made director of radiophonic schools. In 1959 he became the diocesan delegate of Catholic Action, and also worked as ecclesiastical assistant to the Catholic Workers Youth. He did catechetical and curial work before serving as general secretary of the Colombian Episcopal Conference.

== Bishop ==
On 2 June 1971, Castrillón Hoyos was appointed Coadjutor Bishop of Pereira and Titular Bishop of Villa Regis by Pope Paul VI. He received his episcopal consecration on 18 July from Archbishop Angelo Palmas, with Archbishop Aníbal Muñoz Duque and Bishop Baltasar Álvarez Restrepo serving as co-consecrators. Castrillón Hoyos succeeded Alvarez Restrepo as Bishop of Pereira on 1 July 1976.

While Bishop of Pereira, Castrillón Hoyos was reported to have walked the streets at night to help feed abandoned children. While many Latin American bishops refused to accept contributions from suspected drug lords, Castrillón Hoyos accepted donations for his diocesan charities, arguing that by accepting the funds, they would be diverted from funding crime and instead used to help the poor. He said that when accepting such donations, he had warned the donors personally that their donations "would not save their souls". Castrillón Hoyos once disguised himself as a milkman to gain access to the home of drug lord Pablo Escobar, and after revealing himself, the bishop persuaded Escobar to confess his sins. Castrillón Hoyos also served as Secretary General (1983–1987) and President (1987–1991) of the Latin American Episcopal Conference, where he opposed liberation theology, which many of his colleagues supported.

Castrillón Hoyos was made Archbishop of Bucaramanga on 16 December 1991. He remained in that post until 15 June 1996, when he became Pro-Prefect of the Congregation for the Clergy in the Roman Curia.

== Cardinal ==
Styles of Darío Castrillón Hoyos
- Reference style: His Eminence
- Spoken style: Your Eminence
- Religious style: Monsignor
- Informal style: Cardinal
- See: Bucaramanga (Emeritus)

John Paul II created him Cardinal-Deacon of SS. Nome di Maria al Foro Traiano in the consistory of 21 February 1998. Two days later, on 23 February, Castrillón Hoyos was given the title Prefect of the Congregation for Clergy. On 26 October of that same year he served as papal envoy to the signing of the peace accord between Peru and Ecuador to settle their border dispute.

On 14 April 2000, he replaced Angelo Felici as President of the Pontifical Commission Ecclesia Dei, the office that handles the Holy See's relations with traditionalist groups such as the Society of St. Pius X.

Castrillón was appointed Grand Prior of the Sacred Military Constantinian Order of Saint George by Infante Carlos, Duke of Calabria on 27 February 2004.

Following the death of John Paul II, Castrillón participated in the 2005 papal conclave and was himself considered papabile, a possible successor to the papacy. Pope Benedict XVI confirmed him as Prefect of the Congregation for the Clergy and President of the Pontifical Commission Ecclesia Dei.

On 31 October 2006, Castrillón resigned as head of the Congregation for the Clergy. On 13 September 2007 Castrillón served as a spokesman for Pope Benedict's motu proprio Summorum Pontificum.

On 23 February 2007, Castrillón became Protodeacon, the senior Cardinal-Deacon, which he remained until 1 March 2008, when he was elevated to Cardinal-Priest.

== Retirement ==
Castrillón retired on 8 July 2009. On the same day, Pope Benedict issued the document Ecclesiae Unitatem, which attached the Pontifical Commission Ecclesia Dei to the Congregation for the Doctrine of the Faith, making that Congregation's prefect the president of the Commission ex officio.

In January 2009, while Castrillón still headed the Pontifical Commission, Pope Benedict lifted the excommunications several bishops of the Society of St. Pius X (SSPX), including Richard Williamson, who was later identified a Holocaust denier. In September Bishop Anders Arborelius of Stockholm alleged that the Holy See had prior knowledge of Williamson's extreme views, and his view was confirmed by the papal nuncio to Sweden Archbishop Emil Paul Tscherrig who said he had warned the Vatican. Castrillón said that it was a "calumny" to suggest he had been aware of Williamson's views. He said that if anyone in the Vatican should have known about the matter, it was Cardinal Giovanni Battista Re, Prefect of the Congregation of Bishops, who had responsibility for overseeing Williamson.

== Handling of sexual abuse cases ==
In 2002, Castrillón expressed his disapproval of the zero-tolerance policy of the U.S. bishops with respect to cases of sexual abuse. He said the bishops ignored such "fundamental principles of the Church" as forgiveness and conversion.

In 2001, Castrillón congratulated French bishop Pierre Pican, Bishop of Bayeux, France, for not notifying the police about a priest who had engaged in sexual abuse of minors. The priest was later sentenced to 18 years in jail. Bishop Pican himself received a suspended three-month jail sentence for not denouncing the priest. In the letter Castrillón described the relationship between a bishop and his priests as "not professional but a sacramental relationship which forges very special bonds of spiritual paternity" and continued "The bishop has other means of acting ... but a bishop cannot be required to make the denunciation himself. In all civilised legal systems it is acknowledged that close relations have the possibility of not testifying against a direct relative." When Castrillón's letter to Pican became public in 2010, Vatican spokesman Federico Lombardi said it showed how important it was to centralize handling of Catholic sex abuse cases by clerics under the Congregation for the Doctrine of the Faith."

In 1997, Castrillón and the bishops of Ireland were at odds over the proper treatment of priests accused of sexual abuse. Castrillón expressed reservations about proposals discussed by the bishops. While indicating that his Congregation was still studying the question, Castrillón wrote that some of the Irish bishops' proposals "appear contrary to canonical discipline", which could lead to actions being overturned if an appeal were made to a higher level. Castrillón mentioned the proposed policy of mandatory reporting to the civil authorities. According to a 2011 RTÉ documentary, Castrillón told the Irish bishops in 1999 to be "fathers to your priests, not policemen". The documentary's depiction of resistance the Irish bishops experienced from Castrillón put them in a more favorable light at a time when they, and especially Archbishop Desmond Connell, were the target of savage criticism.

Castrillón's Congregation for Clergy and the Congregation for the Doctrine of the Faith, then headed by Cardinal Joseph Ratzinger, later Pope Benedict XVI, were also at odds. In 2001, Ratzinger persuaded Pope John Paul II to make it mandatory to report all complaints of clerical sexual abuse to the Congregation for the Doctrine of the Faith.

Catholic Church titles
Preceded by Saturnino Rubio y Montiél	Titular Bishop of Villa regis 2 June 1971 – 1 July 1976	Succeeded by Franz Xaver Eder
Preceded by Baltasar Alvarez Restrepo	Bishop of Pereira; 1 July 1976 – 16 December 1992	Succeeded by Fabio Suescún Mutis
Preceded by Antonio Quarracino	General Secretary of the Latin American Episcopal Conference; 1983–1987	Succeeded by Oscar Andrés Rodríguez Maradiaga S.D.B.
Preceded by Antonio Quarracino	President of the Latin American Episcopal Conference; 1987–1991	Succeeded by Nicolás de Jesús López Rodríguez
Preceded by Héctor Rueda Hernández	Archbishop of Bucaramanga; 16 December 1992 – 15 June 1996	Succeeded by Víctor Manuel López Forero
Preceded by José Tomás Sánchez	Prefect of the Congregation for the Clergy; 15 June 1996 – 31 October 2006	Succeeded by Cláudio Hummes O.F.M.
Preceded by Sergio Guerri	Cardinal-Deacon of Santissimo Nome di Maria al Foro Traiano; 21 February 1998 – 1 March 2008	Himself as Cardinal-Priest
Position created	President of the International Council for Catechesis; 23 February 1998 – 31 October 2006	Succeeded by Cláudio Hummes O.F.M.
Preceded by Angelo Felici	President of the Pontifical Commission Ecclesia Dei; 14 April 2000 – 8 July 2009	Succeeded by William Joseph Levada
Preceded by Jorge Medina Estévez	Cardinal Protodeacon; 23 February 2007 – 1 March 2008	Succeeded by Agostino Cacciavillan
Himself as Cardinal-Deacon	Cardinal-Priest 'pro hac vice' of Santissimo Nome di Maria al Foro Traiano; 1 March 2008 – 18 May 2018	Succeeded by Mauro Gambetti O.F.M. Conv.
