= Tadó =

Town in Columbia

Coordinates: 5°16′N 76°34′W

- Municipality and town
- Flag

- Location of the municipality and town of Tadó in the Chocó Department of Colombia.
- Country: Colombia
- Department: Chocó Department

Population (Census 2018)
  - Total: 17,000
- Time zone: UTC-5 (Colombia Standard Time)

Tadó (Spanish pronunciation: [taˈðo]) is a municipality and town in the Chocó Department, Colombia.

== Climate ==
Tadó has an extremely wet tropical rainforest climate (Af) with very heavy to extremely heavy rainfall year-round.

Climate data for Tadó
| Month | Jan | Feb | Mar | Apr | May | Jun | Jul | Aug | Sep | Oct | Nov | Dec | Year |
|---|---|---|---|---|---|---|---|---|---|---|---|---|---|
| Mean daily maximum °C (°F) | 30.2 (86.4) | 30.1 (86.2) | 30.7 (87.3) | 30.5 (86.9) | 30.6 (87.1) | 30.2 (86.4) | 30.7 (87.3) | 30.6 (87.1) | 30.4 (86.7) | 29.9 (85.8) | 29.6 (85.3) | 29.9 (85.8) | 30.3 (86.5) |
| Daily mean °C (°F) | 26.2 (79.2) | 26.1 (79.0) | 26.6 (79.9) | 26.5 (79.7) | 26.5 (79.7) | 26.1 (79.0) | 26.5 (79.7) | 26.4 (79.5) | 26.3 (79.3) | 25.9 (78.6) | 25.7 (78.3) | 26.0 (78.8) | 26.2 (79.2) |
| Mean daily minimum °C (°F) | 22.2 (72.0) | 22.1 (71.8) | 22.5 (72.5) | 22.5 (72.5) | 22.4 (72.3) | 22.1 (71.8) | 22.3 (72.1) | 22.2 (72.0) | 22.2 (72.0) | 22.0 (71.6) | 21.9 (71.4) | 22.1 (71.8) | 22.2 (72.0) |
| Average rainfall mm (inches) | 541 (21.3) | 505 (19.9) | 513 (20.2) | 627 (24.7) | 674 (26.5) | 641 (25.2) | 585 (23.0) | 854 (33.6) | 822 (32.4) | 853 (33.6) | 732 (28.8) | 574 (22.6) | 7,921 (311.8) |
