= Diocese of Cúcuta =

Diocese of the Catholic Church in Colombia

Coordinates: 7.8863°N 72.5037°W

Diocese of Cúcuta Dioecesis Cucutensis

Catholic

Location
- Country: Colombia
- Ecclesiastical province: Nueva Pamplona

Statistics
- Area: 2,200 km^{2} (850 sq mi)
- Population: Total; Catholics: (as of 2006); 803,000; 722,000 (89.9%)

Information
- Rite: Latin Rite
- Established: 29 May 1956 (70 years ago)
- Cathedral: Catedral de San José

Current leadership
- Pope: Leo XIV
- Bishop: José Libardo Garcés Monsalve
- Bishops emeritus: Julio César Vidal Ortiz

Map

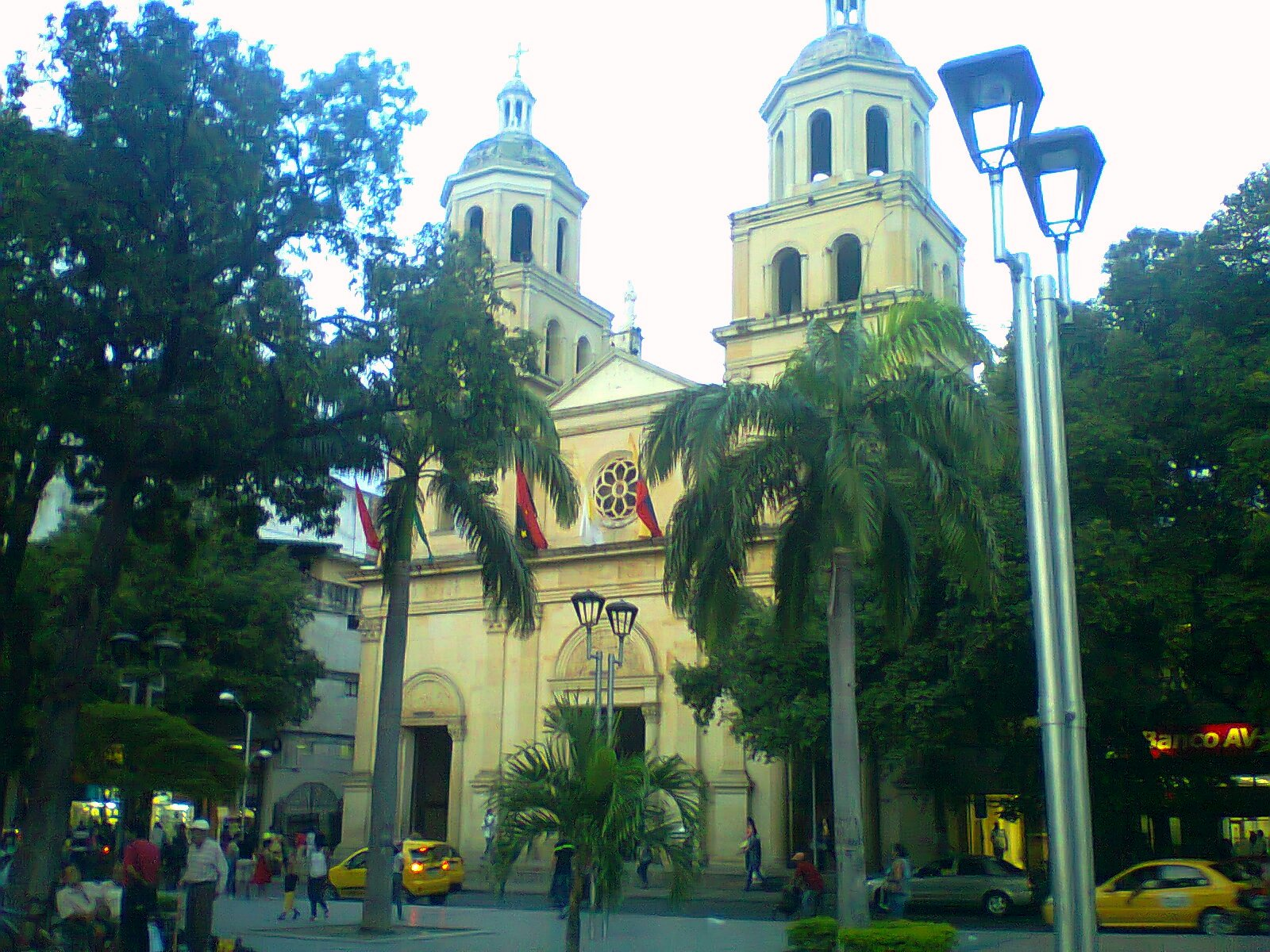
San José Cathedral

The Roman Catholic Diocese of Cúcuta (Latin: Cucutensis) is a diocese located in the city of Cúcuta in the ecclesiastical province of Nueva Pamplona in Colombia.

== History ==
- 29 May 1956: Established as Diocese of Cúcuta from the Diocese of Nueva Pamplona

== Ordinaries ==
- Luis Pérez Hernández, C.I.M. † (29 May 1956 – 28 Jun 1959) Died
- Pablo Correa León † (22 Jul 1959 – 27 Jul 1970) Resigned
- Pedro Rubiano Sàenz (2 Jun 1971 – 26 Mar 1983) Appointed, Coadjutor Archbishop of Cali
- Alberto Giraldo Jaramillo, P.S.S. (26 Jul 1983 – 18 Dec 1990) Appointed, Archbishop of Popayán
- Rubén Salazar Gómez (11 Feb 1992 – 18 Mar 1999) Appointed, Archbishop of Barranquilla
- Oscar Urbina Ortega (9 Nov 1999 – 30 Nov 2007) Appointed, Archbishop of Villavicencio
- Jaime Prieto Amaya † (1 Dec 2008 – 25 Aug 2010) Died
- Julio César Vidal Ortiz (16 Jul 2011 – 24 Jul 2015) Resigned
- Víctor Manuel Ochoa Cadavid (24 Jul 2015 – 7 Dec 2020) Appointed, Bishop of Colombia, Military
- José Libardo Garcés Monsalve (4 Oct 2021 – present)

== See also ==
- Roman Catholicism in Colombia
