= Diocese of Tibú =

Diocese of the Catholic Church in Colombia

Coordinates: 8°39′N 72°44′W

Diocese of Tibú Dioecesis Tibuensis

Catholic

Location
- Country: Colombia
- Ecclesiastical province: Nueva Pamplona

Statistics
- Area: 7,825 km^{2} (3,021 sq mi)
- Population: Total; Catholics: (as of 2004); 190,000; 180,000 (94.7%)

Information
- Rite: Latin Rite
- Established: 1 August 1951 (75 years ago)

Current leadership
- Pope: Leo XIV
- Bishop: Israel Bravo Cortés

Map
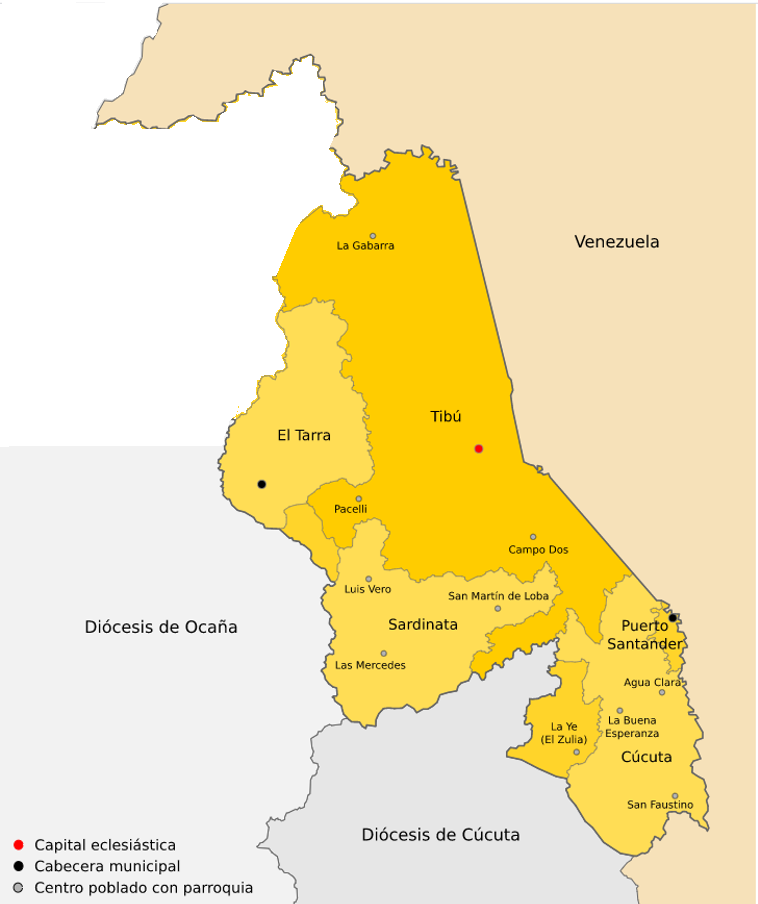

The Roman Catholic Diocese of Tibú (Latin: Tibuensis) is located in the city of Tibú in the ecclesiastical province of Nueva Pamplona in Colombia.

== History ==
- 1 August 1951: Established as Territorial Prelature of Bertrania en el Catatumbo from the Diocese of Nueva Pamplona
- 16 November 1983: Renamed as Territorial Prelature of Tibú
- 29 December 1998: Promoted as Diocese of Tibú

== Ordinaries, in reverse chronological order ==
- Bishops of Tibú (Latin Rite), below
  - Israel Bravo Cortés (since 2021.11.05)
  - Omar Alberto Sánchez Cubillos, O.P. (2011.06.08 – 2020.10.12), appointed Archbishop of Popayán
  - Camilo Fernando Castrellón Pizano, S.D.B. (2001.04.23 – 2009.12.02), appointed Bishop of Barrancabermeja
  - José de Jesús Quintero Díaz (1998.12.29 – 2000.10.23), appointed Vicar Apostolic of Leticia
- Prelates of Tibú (Latin Rite), below
  - José de Jesús Quintero Díaz (1996.01.05 – 1998.12.29)
  - Luis Madrid Merlano (1988.05.21 – 1995.04.19), appointed Bishop of Cartago
  - Horacio Olave Velandia (1988.01.21 – 1988.03.17)
  - Jorge Leonardo Gómez Serna, O.P. (1980.10.09 – 1986.03.06), appointed Bishop of Socorro y San Gil
- Prelate of Bertrania en el Catatumbo (Latin Rite), below
  - Fr. Juan José Díaz Plata, O.P. (1953.09.13 – 1979.08.02)

== See also ==
- Roman Catholicism in Colombia
