= Héctor Rueda Hernández =

Colombian prelate

- Archbishop Emeritus of Medellín
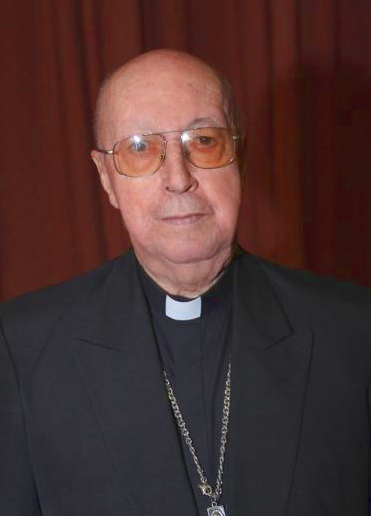
- Church: Roman Catholic Church
- Archdiocese: Medellín
- See: Medellín
- Appointed: 7 November 1991
- Installed: 12 December 1991
- Term ended: 13 February 1997
- Predecessor: Alfonso López Trujillo
- Successor: Alberto Giraldo Jaramillo
- Previous posts: Bishop of Bucaramanga (1960–74); Archbishop of Bucaramanga (1974-91); President of the Colombian Episcopal Conference (1984–87)

Orders
- Ordination: 15 December 1946 by Luis Andrade Valderrama
- Consecration: 19 June 1960 by Giuseppe Paupini

Personal details
- Born: Héctor Rueda Hernández; 9 November 1920 Mogotes, Colombia
- Died: 1 November 2011 (aged 90) Bucaramanga, Colombia
- Parents: Cerafino Rueda; Raquelina Hernández
- Education: Major Seminary of Bogotá, Pontifical Lateran University
- Motto: Vobis in Patrem

- Coat of arms

Héctor Rueda Hernández (November 9, 1920 – November 1, 2011) was a Colombian prelate of the Roman Catholic Church.

== Biography ==
Rueda Hernández was born in Colombia and ordained a priest on December 15, 1946. Rueda Hernández was appointed the bishop of the Archdiocese of Bucaramanga on May 5, 1960 and consecrated on June 19, 1960. On December 14, 1974, Rueda Hernández was appointed archbishop of the Archdiocese of Bucaramanga and remained in the diocese until he was appointed archbishop of the Archdiocese of Medellín on November 7, 1991. Rueda Hernández retired from the Archdiocese of Medellin on February 13, 1997.

== See also ==
Catholic Church titles
Preceded by Created	Archbishop of Bucaramanga; 1974–1991	Succeeded by Darío Castrillón Hoyos
Preceded by Alfonso López Trujillo	Archbishop of Medellín; 1991–1997	Succeeded by Alberto Giraldo Jaramillo
