= Aníbal Muñoz Duque =

His Eminence Aníbal Muñoz Duque
- Cardinal, Archbishop Emeritus of Bogotá
- Church: Catholic Church
- Archdiocese: Bogotá
- Appointed: 29 July 1972
- Term ended: 25 June 1984
- Predecessor: Luis Concha Córdoba
- Successor: Mario Revollo Bravo
- Other post: Cardinal-Priest of San Bartolomeo all'Isola (1973-87)
- Previous posts: Bishop of Socorro y San Gil (1951-52); Bishop of Bucaramanga (1952-59); Archbishop of Nueva Pamplona (1959-68); President of the Colombian Episcopal Conference (1966-72); Titular Archbishop of Cariana (1968-72); Coadjutor Archbishop of Bogotá (1969-72); Military Vicar of Colombia (1972-84)

Orders
- Ordination: 19 November 1933 by Miguel Ángel Builes Gómez
- Consecration: 27 May 1951 by Antonio Samorè
- Created cardinal: 5 March 1973 by Paul VI
- Rank: Cardinal-Priest

Personal details
- Born: Aníbal Muñoz Duque; 3 October 1908 Santa Rosa de Osos, Colombia
- Died: 15 January 1987 (aged 78) Bogotá, Colombia
- Motto: Jesus Christus et hodie ipse et in saecula

- Coat of arms

Styles of Aníbal Muñoz Duque
- Reference style: His Eminence
- Spoken style: Your Eminence
- Informal style: Cardinal
- See: Bogotá

Aníbal Muñoz Duque (3 October 1908 – 15 January 1987) was a Roman Catholic Cardinal and Archbishop of Bogotá.

== Biography ==
He was born in Santa Rosa de Osos, Colombia as the son of José María Muñoz and Ana Rosa Duque. He was educated at the Seminary of Santa Rosa de Osos. He was ordained to the priesthood 19 November 1933. After his ordination he was a faculty member and prefect of the Minor Seminary of the Institute of Missions of Yarumal from 1933 until 1937. He was then promoted to rector and vice-superior general of the Institute of Yarumal. In 1950 he was Pro-vicar general of the diocese of Santa Rosa de Osos until 1951.

=== Episcopate ===
Pope Pius XII appointed him Bishop of Socorro y San Gil on 8 April 1951. He was consecrated on 27 May by the Nuncio to Colombia. He was transferred to the diocese of Bucaramanga on 18 December 1952. He served there until he was promoted to the metropolitan see of Nueva Pamplona on 3 August 1959. He attended the Second Vatican Council in Rome. He was elected President of the Episcopal conference of Colombia in 1964, serving until 1972. He was appointed apostolic administrator of the archdiocese of Bogotá on 15 April 1967 and transferred to the titular see of Cariana on 30 March 1968. He hosted the visit of Pope Paul VI to Bogotá in August 1968 on the occasion of the 39th International Eucharistic Congress; it was the first papal visit to Latin America. He was named Coadjutor Archbishop of Bogotá on 2 February 1969. He succeeded to the archdiocese of Bogotá on 29 July 1972. He was named the military vicar of Colombia the next day.

=== Cardinalate ===
He was created and proclaimed Cardinal-Priest of San Bartolomeo all'Isola in the consistory of 5 March 1973 by Pope Paul. He took part in the conclaves that elected Pope John Paul I and Pope John Paul II in August and October. He resigned the pastoral government of the archdiocese of Bogotá on 25 June 1984. He died in 1987. He is buried in the Santa Fe De Bogota Cathedral near the chapel of El Sagrario.

== See also ==
Catholic Church titles
Preceded by Luis Concha Córdoba	Archbishop of Bogotá; 29 July 1972 – 25 June 1984	Succeeded by Mario Revollo Bravo
