= Archdiocese of Nueva Pamplona =

Catholic archdiocese in Colombia

Coordinates: 7.3781°N 72.6525°W

Archdiocese of Nueva Pamplona Archidioecesis Neo-Pampilonensis

Catholic

Location
- Country: Colombia
- Ecclesiastical province: Nueva Pamplona

Statistics
- Area: 6,571 km^{2} (2,537 sq mi)
- Population: Total; Catholics: (as of 2013); 221,000; 211,300 (95.6%)

Information
- Rite: Latin Rite
- Established: 25 September 1835 (191 years ago)
- Cathedral: Catedral de Santa Clara

Current leadership
- Pope: Leo XIV
- Archbishop: Jorge Alberto Ossa Soto
- Bishops emeritus: Luis Madrid Merlano

Map

Website
- www.arquipamplona.org

The Roman Catholic Archdiocese of Nueva Pamplona (Latin: Neo-Pampilonensis) is an archdiocese located in the city of Nueva Pamplona in Colombia.

== History ==
On 25 September 1835, Pope Gregory XVI established the Diocese of Nueva Pamplona from the Metropolitan Archdiocese of Santafé en Nueva Granada. It was then a suffragan of the Archdiocese of Bogotá. The first bishop, José Jorge Torres Estans, a native of Cartagena, ruled from 30 August 1837, to 17 April 1853, when he died at the age of 81, an exile in San Antonio del Fáchira, Venezuela. His successor, José Luis Niño, named vicar Apostolic, was consecrated in October, 1856, and also died an exile in San Antonio del Fáchira, 12 February 1864. The third bishop, Bonifacio Antonio Toscano, governed from 13 October 1865, to his retirement in 1873. He convoked the first diocesan synod, and assisted at the Provincial Council of New Granada in 1868 and at the First Vatican Council. Indalecio Barreto succeeded him 3 December 1874, and died 19 March 1875, at La Vega near Cúcuta. The Bishop of Panamá, Ignacio Antonio Parra, his successor, ruled from 8 June 1876, until his death, 21 February 1908. Bishop Parra had been exiled by the Liberal government from 1877 to 1878. Evaristo Blanco was transferred from the Diocese of Socorro, 15 August 1909. It was elevated to an archdiocese on 29 May 1956.

== Bishops ==
- Bishops of Nueva Pamplona
  - José Jorge de Torres y Estans † (21 Nov 1836 – 19 Apr 1853) Died
  - José Luis Niño † (27 May 1856 – 19 Apr 1864) Died
  - Bonifacio Antonio Toscano † (16 Dec 1864 – 18 Nov 1873) Resigned
  - Indalecio Barreto † (16 Jan 1874 – 20 Mar 1875) Died
  - Ignacio Antonio Parra † (17 Sep 1875 – 21 Feb 1908) Died
  - Evaristo Blanco † (27 Mar 1909 – 15 Sep 1915) Died
  - Rafael Afanador y Cadena † (5 Jun 1916 – 29 May 1956) Resigned
- Archbishops of Nueva Pamplona
  - Bernardo Botero Álvarez, C.M. † (29 May 1956 – 28 Jun 1959) Died
  - Aníbal Muñoz Duque † (3 Aug 1959 – 27 Mar 1968) Appointed, Apostolic Administrator of Bogotá; future Cardinal
  - Alfredo Rubio Diaz † (27 Mar 1968 – 28 Feb 1978) Resigned
  - Mario Revollo Bravo † (28 Feb 1978 – 25 Jun 1984) Appointed, Archbishop of Bogotá; future Cardinal
  - Rafael Sarmiento Peralta † (12 Jan 1985 – 21 Jun 1994) Resigned
  - Víctor Manuel López Forero (21 Jun 1994 – 27 Jun 1998) Appointed, Archbishop of Bucaramanga
  - Gustavo Martínez Frías † (18 Mar 1999 – 29 Aug 2009) Died
  - Luis Madrid Merlano (30 Mar 2010 – 6 June 2018)
  - Jorge Alberto Ossa Soto (15 October 2019 – present)

=== Auxiliary bishops ===
- José de Jesús Martinez Vargas † (1949-1951), appointed Auxiliary Bishop of Bogotá
- Jaime Cristóbal Abril González (2016-2019), appointed Bishop of Arauca

=== Other priests of this diocese who became bishops ===
- Ramón Alberto Rolón Güepsa, appointed Bishop of Montería in 2012

== Suffragan dioceses ==
- Arauca
- Cúcuta
- Ocaña
- Tibú

== See also ==
- Roman Catholicism in Colombia
