= Archdiocese of Medellín =

Catholic archdiocese in Colombia

Coordinates: 6.2167°N 75.5667°W

Archdiocese of Medellín Archidioecesis Medellensis

Catholic

Location
- Country: Colombia

Statistics
- Area: 708 km^{2} (273 sq mi)
- Population: Total; Catholics: (as of 2004); 3,012,847; 2,625,494 (87.1%)

Information
- Rite: Latin Rite
- Established: 14 February 1868 (158 years ago)
- Cathedral: Catedral Basílica Metropolitana de la Inmaculada Concepción

Current leadership
- Pope: Leo XIV
- Archbishop: Ricardo Antonio Tobón Restrepo
- Auxiliary Bishops: José Mauricio Vélez García

Map

Website
- arqmedellin.co

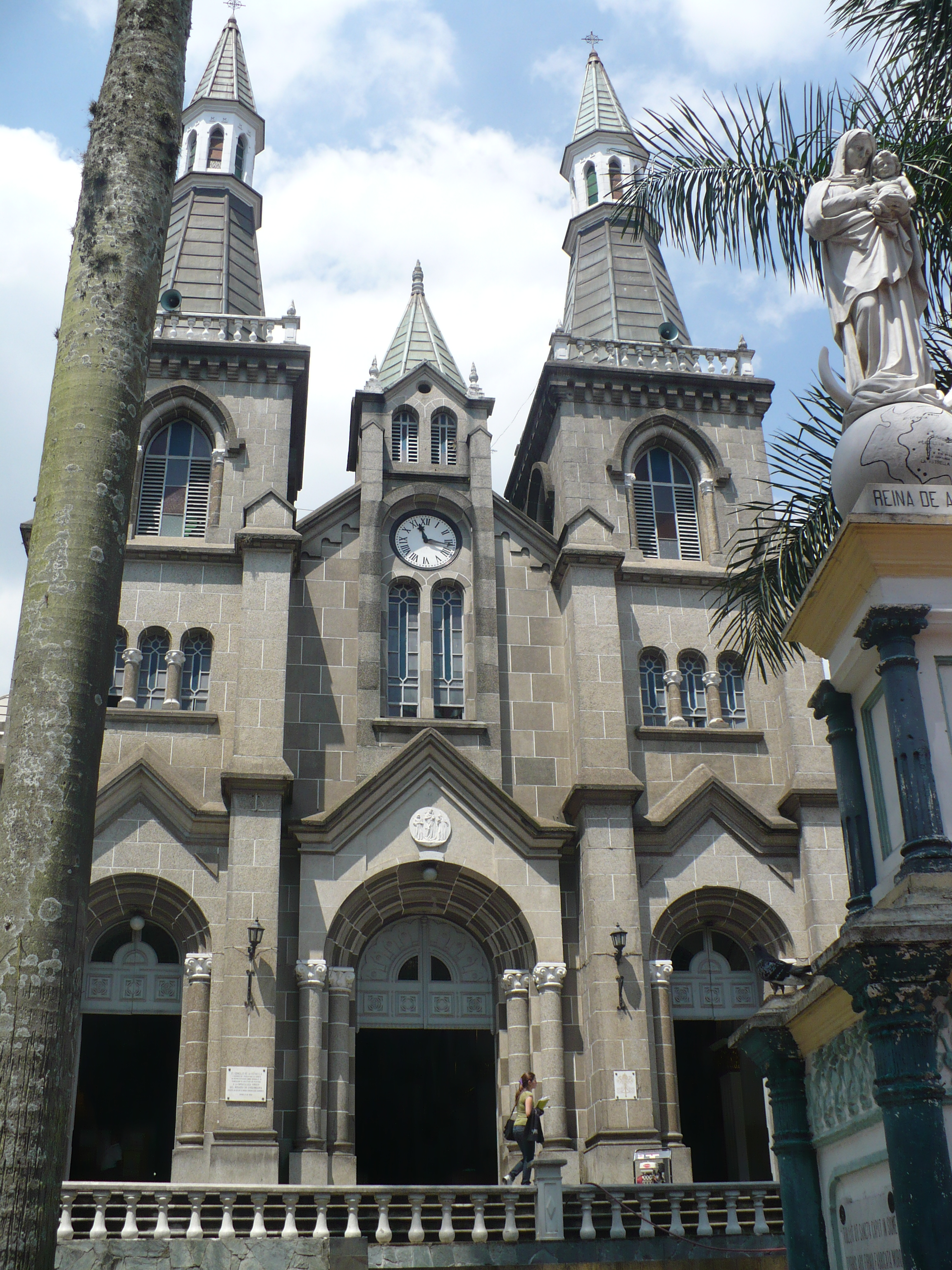
Basílica Menor Nuestra Señora del Rosario de Chiquinquirá, La Estrella

The Roman Catholic Archdiocese of Medellín (Latin: Archidioecesis Medellensis; Spanish: Arquidiócesis de Medellín) is an archdiocese located in the city of Medellín in Colombia.

Archbishop Ricardo Antonio Tobón Restrepo is the current archbishop of Medellín.

== History ==
- 14 February 1868: Established as Diocese of Medellín from the Diocese of Antioquía
- 24 February 1902: Promoted as Metropolitan Archdiocese of Medellín

== Special churches ==
- Minor Basilicas:
  - Basílica de Nuestra Señora del Rosario de Chiquinquirá, La Estrella
  - Nuestra Señora de la Candelaria, Medellín
  - Medellín cathedral is also a minor basilica.

== Bishops and Metropolitan Archbishops of Medellín ==
Name	Dates of service
Valerio Antonio Jiménez (Ximenes)	(13 Mar 1868 Appointed - 29 May 1873 Resigned)
José Joaquín Isaza Ruiz	(29 May 1873 Succeeded - 29 Dec 1874 Died)
José Ignacio Montoya Peláez	(7 Apr 1876 Appointed - 15 Jul 1884 Died)
Bernardo Herrera Restrepo	(27 Mar 1885 Appointed – 4 Jun 1891 Appointed, Archbishop of Santafé en Nueva Granada)
Joaquín Pardo Vergara	(22 Jan 1892 Appointed – )
Manuel José Caicedo Martínez	(14 Dec 1905 Appointed – 22 Jun 1937 Died)
Tiberio Salazar Herrera	(22 Jun 1937 Succeeded – 1942 Died)
Joaquín Garcia Benitez	(14 May 1942 Appointed – 28 Nov 1957 Retired)
Tulio Botero Salazar	(8 Dec 1957 Appointed – 2 Jun 1979 Retired)
Alfonso López Trujillo [Cardinal in 1983]	(2 Jun 1979 Succeeded – 9 Jan 1991 Resigned)
Héctor Rueda Hernández	(7 Nov 1991 Appointed – 13 Feb 1997 Retired)
Alberto Giraldo Jaramillo P.S.S.	(13 Feb 1997 Appointed – 16 Feb 2010 Retired)
Ricardo Antonio Tobón Restrepo	(16 Feb 2010 Appointed – present)

== Other affiliated bishops ==
=== Coadjutor bishops ===
- José Joaquín Isaza Ruiz (1869–1873)
- Tiberio de Jesús Salazar y Herrera (1932–1937)
- Alfonso López Trujillo (1978–1979); future Cardinal

=== Auxiliary bishops ===
- Francesco Saverio Zaldúa (1882); did not take effect
- Mosé Higuera (1884–1915)
- Buenaventura Jáuregui Prieto (1951–1957), appointed Bishop of Zipaquirá
- Miguel Antonio Medina y Medina (1959–1964), appointed Bishop of Montería
- Octavio Betancourt Arango (1970–1975), appointed Bishop of Garzón
- Rodrigo Arango Velásquez, P.S.S. (1981–1985), appointed Bishop of Buga
- Fabio Betancur Tirado (1982–1984), appointed Bishop of La Dorada-Guaduas
- José Roberto López Londoño (1982–1987), appointed Bishop of Armenia
- Abraham Escudero Montoya (1986–1990), appointed Bishop of Espinal
- Carlos Prada Sanmiguel (1988–1994), appointed Bishop of Duitama-Sogamoso
- Tulio Duque Gutiérrez, S.D.S. (1993–1997), appointed Bishop of Apartadó
- Darío de Jesús Monsalve Mejía (1993–2001), appointed Bishop of Málaga-Soatá
- Orlando Antonio Corrales García (1998–2001), appointed Bishop of Palmira
- Gonzalo de Jesús Rivera Gómez (1998–2010)
- Jorge Iván Castaño Rubio, C.M.F. (2001–2010)
- Gilberto Jiménez Narváez (2001–2012)
- Víctor Manuel Ochoa Cadavid (2006–2011), appointed Bishop of Málaga-Soatá
- Edgar Aristizábal Quintero (2011–2017), appointed Bishop of Yopal
- Hugo Alberto Torres Marín (2011–2015), appointed Bishop of Apartadó
- Elkin Fernando Álvarez Botero (2012–2020), appointed Bishop of Santa Rosa de Osos
- José Mauricio Vélez García (2017-

=== Other priests of this diocese who became bishops ===
- Manuel Antonio López de Mesa, appointed Bishop of Antioquía in 1902
- Emilio Botero González, appointed Bishop of Pasto in 1947
- Guillermo Escobar Vélez, appointed Auxiliary Bishop of Antioquía in 1952
- Alfonso Uribe Jaramillo, appointed Auxiliary Bishop of Cartagena in 1963
- Gonzalo Restrepo Restrepo, appointed Auxiliary Bishop of Cali in 2003
- Fidel León Cadavid Marin (priest here, 1976–1988), appointed Bishop of Quibdó in 2011
- Luis Fernando Rodríguez Velásquez, appointed Auxiliary Bishop of Cali in 2014
- Luis Albeiro Maldonado Monsalve, appointed Bishop of Mocoa-Sibundoy in 2015

== Suffragan dioceses ==
- Caldas
- Girardota
- Jericó
- Sonsón – Rionegro

== See also ==
- Roman Catholicism in Colombia
