= Emilio de Brigard Ortiz =

Colombian prelate

The Most Reverend Emilio de Brigard Ortiz
- Auxiliary Archbishop of Bogotá
- Church: Catholic Church
- Archdiocese: Bogotá
- Appointed: 29 July 1944 by Pope Pius XII
- Term ended: 6 March 1986

Orders
- Ordination: 28 October 1911 by Bernardo Herrera Restrepo
- Consecration: 3 September 1944 by Ismael Perdomo Borrero

Personal details
- Born: 15 May 1888 Chía, Cundinamarca, Colombia
- Died: 6 March 1986 (aged 97) Bogotá, Colombia
- Buried: Primatial Cathedral of Bogotá
- Parents: Luís de Brigard Saíz; María Josefa Ortiz Álvarez
- Education: Major Seminary of Bogotá; Pontifical Pio Latino American College; Pontifical Gregorian University

Ordination history of Emilio de Brigard Ortiz
History
Priestly ordination
- Ordained by: Bernardo Herrera Restrepo
Episcopal consecration
- Principal consecrator: Ismael Perdomo Borrero
- Co-consecrators: Luis Concha Córdoba; Luis Andrade Valderrama

Emilio de Brigard Ortiz (15 May 1888 – 6 March 1986) was a Colombian prelate of the Catholic Church. From 1944 until his death in 1986, he was an auxiliary bishop of the Archdiocese of Bogotá.

Born in Chía, Cundinamarca, he entered the Major Seminary of Bogotá as a child and was ordained a priest in 1911. He studied at the Pontifical Gregorian University, returning to Colombia in 1918. He served the Archdiocese of Bogotá in varied capacities, including as a chaplain for clergy, and a school chaplain. In 1944, he was ordained a bishop and was appointed auxiliary bishop of Bogotá. In 1950, he became the vicar general for the archdiocese. In the 1960s, he was made a titular archbishop and participated in the Second Vatican Council.

== Early life and education ==
Emilio de Brigard Ortiz was born on 15 May 1888, in Chía, Cundinamarca, Colombia. He was of Spanish, French, and Polish descent. His great-great-grandfather was Antonio Nariño, the Colombian independence fighter and statesman. His parents, Luís de Brigard Saíz and María Josefa Ortiz Álvarez, both came from prominent families, and were dignified but simple people. They instilled in Brigard humanitarian principles and a devout Catholic faith. He had three siblings: Julio, Arturo, and María Luisa.

Brigard was admitted as a child to the Major Seminary of Bogotá to study. He was ordained to the priesthood on 28 October 1911, at the age of 23, by the Archbishop of Bogotá, Bernardo Herrera Restrepo. A few months later he was appointed chaplain of the San Antonio Asylum. Soon after, he was sent to Rome, Italy, and entered the Pontifical Pio Latino American College. He earned two advanced degrees from the Pontifical Gregorian University, graduating with his Doctor of Theology in 1915 and his Doctor of Canon Law in 1917.

== Priesthood ==
After completing his education in Rome, he returned to Colombia in 1918 and began a long and varied career in service of the Archdiocese of Bogotá. His work was often focused especially on care for children, the poor and the sick, and took up the cause of striving to gain better working conditions for laborers. He provided support to poorly-funded charity homes and provided charity to those in need. He was revered by the many he served and worked with, and was affectionately nicknamed "el Doctorcito" (diminutive of "the Doctor").

Officially, he served in various offices throughout his priesthood: as a chaplain to fellow priests, director of the "Home for Homeless Children," and the chaplain of the Visitation Order monastery in Bogotá. However, he was best known for serving as the chaplain of the Gimnasio Moderno, Gimnasio Nuevo, Gimnasio Femenino, and the Colegio de la Presentación Centro schools in Bogotá. He was also on the faculty of the Major Seminary of Bogotá, his alma mater, and the Pontifical Xavierian University, among others. He also served as the chancellor of the archdiocese.

== Auxiliary bishop ==
On 29 July 1944, Brigard was appointed Auxiliary Bishop of Bogotá and Titular Bishop of Coracesium by Pope Pius XII. His episcopal consecration took place on 3 September 1944 at the Primatial Cathedral of Bogotá, with the Archbishop of Bogotá Ismael Perdomo Borrero, as principal consecrator. The Bishop of Manizales, Luis Concha Córdoba, and the Bishop of Antioquía, Luis Andrade Valderrama, served as co-consecrators.

As auxiliary bishop, Brigard grew very close to Archbishop Perdomo. By the mid-1940s, the archbishop was in his 70s, and Brigard assisted him in leading the archdiocese. Brigard often represented the archdiocese at international events, such as the Second National Eucharistic Congress in Ecuador in 1949, and the Quinquennial visit ad limina in the Vatican City in 1950. When Archbishop Perdomo died on 3 June 1950, Brigard was appointed vicar capitular, in which capacity he administered the archdiocese until 8 September 1950, when Crisanto Luque Sánchez was installed as archbishop. He then became the vicar general of the archdiocese.

Throughout his episcopacy, Brigard ordained many priests and co-consecrated multiple bishops. He ordained Father José Miguel López Hurtado in 1946, and ordained two priests who went on to become bishops: Héctor Luis Gutiérrez Pabón in 1962 and Fabio Suescún Mutis in 1966. The bishops he co-consecrated were: Vicente Roig y Villalba in 1945, Luis Pérez Hernández in 1946, Camilo Plácido Crous y Salichs in 1947, Baltasar Álvarez Restrepo in 1949, Antonio Torasso in 1952, Pedro Grau y Arola in 1953, and Pablo Correa León in 1957.

On 11 October 1961, Brigard celebrated his Golden Jubilee, the 50th anniversary of his ordination to the priesthood. The occasion was a very important social event in Bogotá, with many prominent people attending the ceremonies. He was even honored by the pope, who elevated him to Titular Archbishop of Dysti two days before the anniversary. Beginning in 1962, he attended all four sessions of the Second Vatican Council. For his 90th birthday in 1978, he directed his many friends to, instead of giving him gifts, help him start a charitable foundation. Upon the death of Bishop Pierre Kamel Medawar on 27 April 1985, Brigard, at age 96, became the oldest living Catholic bishop, a title he held for less than a year before his death.

== Death and legacy ==
Brigard died on March 6, 1986, in Bogotá. He is buried in the Primatial Cathedral of Bogotá. His legacy lives on in the charitable foundation he started, which now bears his name, and the school Gimnasio Emilio de Brigard in Bogotá, also named for him. The Fundación Emilio de Brigard is based in the Gimnasio Moderno, where Brigard was chaplain.

== Episcopal lineage ==
- Cardinal Scipione Rebiba
- Cardinal Giulio Antonio Santorio (1566)
- Cardinal Girolamo Bernerio, OP (1586)
- Archbishop Galeazzo Sanvitale (1604)
- Cardinal Ludovico Ludovisi (1621)
- Cardinal Luigi Caetani (1622)
- Cardinal Ulderico Carpegna (1630)
- Cardinal Paluzzo Paluzzi Altieri degli Albertoni (1666)
- Pope Benedict XIII (1675)
- Pope Benedict XIV (1724)
- Pope Clement XIII (1743)
- Cardinal Marcantonio Colonna (1762)
- Cardinal Hyacinthe Sigismond Gerdil, CRSP (1777)
- Cardinal Giulio Maria della Somaglia (1788)
- Cardinal Carlo Odescalchi, SJ (1823)
- Cardinal Costantino Patrizi Naro (1828)
- Cardinal Lucido Parocchi (1871)
- Cardinal Girolamo Maria Gotti, OCD (1892)
- Archbishop Ismael Perdomo Borrero (1903)
- Archbishop Emilio de Brigard Ortiz (1944)
