= Major Seminary of Bogotá =

- Seminario Mayor de Bogotá
- Latin: Seminarium Bogotense
- Former names: Seminary of St. Louis (1581–1586); Seminary of St. Bartholomew the Apostle (1605–1771; 1794–1797); Ordinands' College of St. Joseph (1823–1840)
- Motto: Initium Sapientiae Timor Domini
- Motto in English: The beginning of wisdom is the fear of God
- Established: 1581; 445 years ago
- Affiliations: Roman Catholic
- Rector: Rev. Leonardo Cárdenas Téllez
- Academic staff: 7
- Undergraduates: ~200
- Location: Bogotá, Colombia
- Language: Spanish
- Dioceses served: Archdiocese of Bogotá; Diocese of Facatativá
- Website: www.seminariobogota.org

The Theological Seminary of Bogotá, commonly known as the Major Seminary of Bogotá (Spanish: Seminario Conciliar de Bogotá; Seminario Mayor de Bogotá) is a Roman Catholic major seminary located in Bogotá, Colombia, and serving both the Archdiocese of Bogotá and the Diocese of Facatativá. With history dating back to 1581, it is the oldest seminary in the Americas, and today is the largest and most prominent seminaries in Colombia, with dozens of alumni having been appointed bishops, archbishops, and cardinals. In addition to religious leaders, two Colombian presidents have been associated with the seminary. José Manuel Marroquín, the 27th President of Colombia, studied there in the 1840s, and Miguel Abadía Méndez, who was president in the 1920s, taught Latin at the seminary in the early 20th century.

== History ==
=== Early seminaries ===
In 1581, the Seminary of Bogotá, then called the Seminary of St. Louis (Spanish: Seminario de San Luis) opened in Bogotá, the first Catholic seminary in the Americas. It closed in 1586, but Bartolomé Lobo Guerrero, Archbishop of Santafé en Nueva Granada (the original name for the Archdiocese of Bogotá), reopened it in 1605 under a new name, the Seminary of St. Bartholomew the Apostle (Spanish: Seminario de San Bartolomé Apóstol). Guerrero placed the seminary in the care of the Society of Jesus (Jesuits) and introduced the instruction of indigenous languages to prepare the future priests for pastoral care of natives. But in 1767, King Charles III of Spain expelled the Jesuits from the Spanish Empire in an effort to gain control of the wealth held by their missions. After that, diocesan priests staffed the seminary. The seminary was weakened by the loss of the Jesuits and in 1771 was absorbed into another former Jesuit seminary.

In 1794 Archbishop Baltazar Jaime Martinez de Compañón reestablished the seminary, staffed by diocesan priests. In 1797, the archbishop died and the seminary closed as a result. In the years that followed, the struggle for Colombian independence would render it impossible to reopen the seminary at that time.

=== Ordinand's College and merger ===
In the years after Colombian independence, the need for a seminary in Bogotá became feasible. Fernando Caycedo y Flórez, the archbishop at the time, proposed to the new national government the reestablishment of the "Ordinands' College." The Congress of Colombia approved the establishment in 1823, assigning it a location, budget, and internal regulations. The seminary's curriculum was subject to government approval, which caused conflicts with the government. This time, it was renamed the Ordinands' College of St. Joseph (Spanish: Colegio de Ordenandos de San José). The seminary operated independently until 1838, when the government merged it with the National College of St. Bartholomew (Spanish: Colegio Nacional de San Bartolomé).

=== Independent seminary ===
Archbishop Manuel José Mosquera y Arboleda, who had been appointed only three years before the merger, began campaigning for the Bogotá seminary to be reestablished as an independent institution. He efforts succeeded on 21 April 1840, when Congress passed a decree separating the Theological Seminary of Bogotá from the National College of St. Bartholomew. The new seminary, unlike its predecessor, had its own private property, donated by Archbishop Mosquera, and was governed by the archdiocese, not the government. However, the government did reserve the right to require approval for the appointment of the seminary rector. The new statutes for the reestablishment of the seminary, containing 13 chapters and 227 articles, date from 24 August 1840, and the seminary resumed work on 4 October of that year. In 1845, Archbishop Mosquera decided to divide the separate the minor seminary program from the major seminary, entrusting the former to the Jesuits and leaving the latter in the hands of diocesan clergy. However, in 1850 Colombian President José Hilario López expelled the Jesuits as part of his anti-clerical campaign, making it necessary to reunify the two seminaries.

=== Closures and reestablishments ===
The seminary closed briefly in 1851 when the government ordered the seminary building to be converted into barracks. Then, in 1852 the government ordered the seminary to once again merge with the National College of St. Bartholomew. In 1855, Archbishop Antonio Herrán y Zaldúa decided to reopen the seminary as an institution independent of the college. The seminary officially reopened on 13 January 1856. Archbishop Herrán also decided to divide the minor and major departments of the seminary, putting the Jesuits back in charge of the former, as they had returned to Colombia in 1858. However, the major seminary closed in 1861 when Herrán was exiled. Herrán returned to Colombia in 1865 and reopened the seminary in 1865 with 50 seminarians.

In 1868, Vicente Arbeláez Gómez was appointed Archbishop of Bogotá, and he signed off on new statutes for the seminary on 14 December 1868. He named Rev. Dr. Indalecio Barreto Martínez, who would later become an auxiliary bishop, as rector. In 1871, Rev. Bernardo Herrera Restrepo, a 27-year-old priest trained at St. Sulpice Seminary in Paris and who would later become a bishop, became rector. Under his leadership the seminary saw a revival of their customs, improvements to the physical campus, and a reformed curriculum. In 1876 the government confiscated the building to use as a political prison, and the seminary closed. It reopened in 1878, still with Herrera as rector, but at different locations: first in the house where Colombian military and political leader Francisco de Paula Santander had died, and next in the former convent of "La Enseñanza (English: The Teaching). Finally, the seminary gave its building to the College of St. Bartholomew, and was given a former Augustinian Recollect monastery building by the government in exchange. In 1885 the seminary's work was again interrupted as the government seized the building for military purposes and used it as a base for staff of the National Army reserves. Earlier in the year, the seminary rector, Monsignor Herrera, was appointed Archbishop of Medellín. He was replaced by Rev. Dr. Joaquín Gómez Otero.

=== Growth and new buildings ===
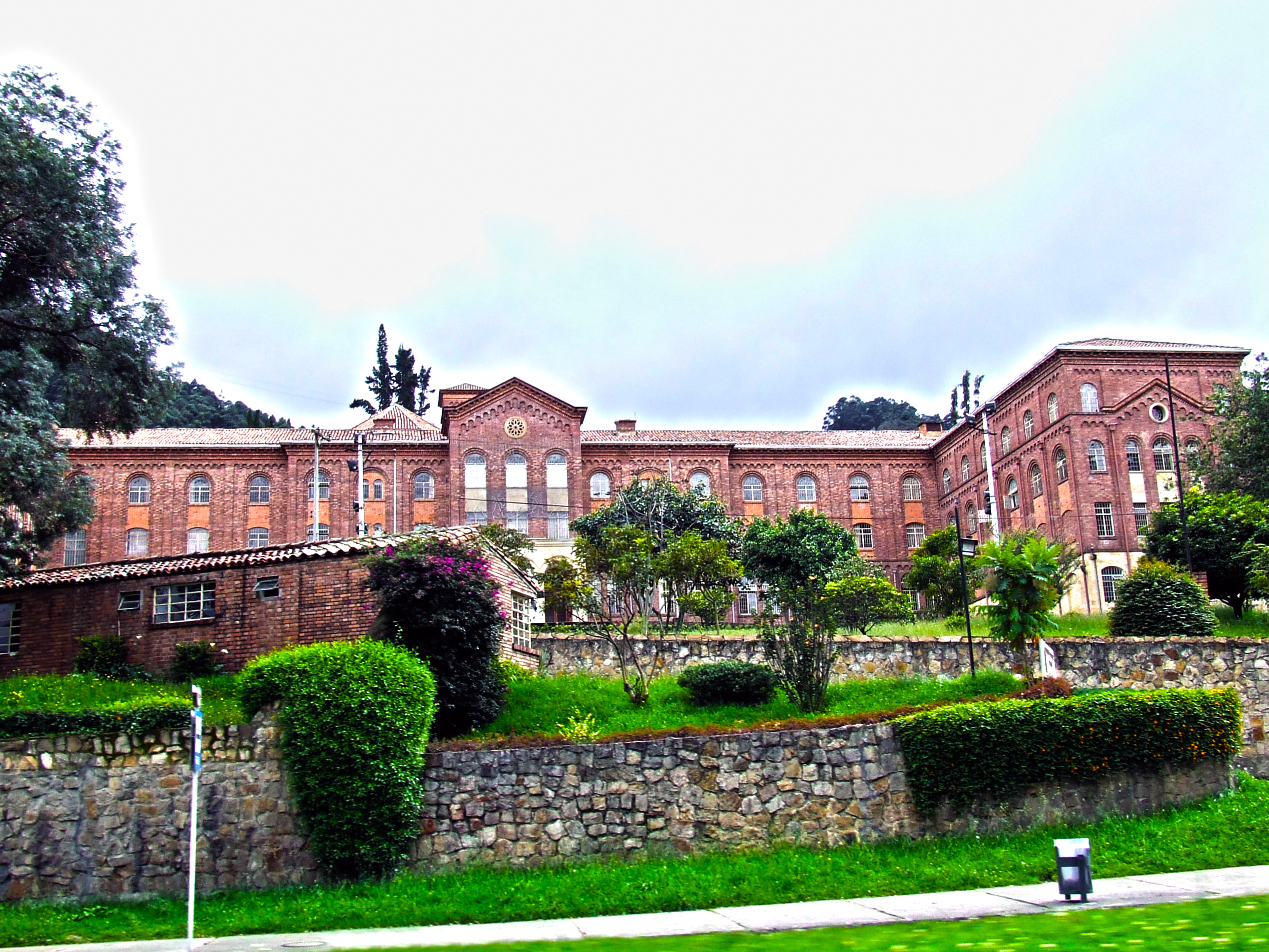
The main building of the seminary, completed in 1946 and commissioned by Archbishop Ismael Perdomo Borrero.

In 1891, Archbishop Herrera was appointed Archbishop of Bogotá, putting him back into contact with the seminary. He gave the seminary new statutes, and wished to construct it a new building. Construction began on the building, located on 11th Street in Bogotá, and the seminary moved its facilities there, but the building was never fully completed. In 1917, upon the publication of the new Code of Canon Law, the seminary's statutes were updated to keep in accordance.

In 1928, Archbishop Ismael Perdomo Borrero divided the seminary into two, a major and minor seminary. In the mid-1940s Perdomo also commissioned the construction of a new seminary building, located in the old "El Chico" haienda, which was completed in 1946 and is still home to the seminary to this day.

=== Vatican II and changing times ===
In 1960 Archbishop Luis Concha Córdoba entrusted the administration of the seminary to the Society of Saint-Sulpice, a religious order headquartered in France. The Second Vatican Council, or Vatican II, came to an end in December 1965 and produced noticeable changes in the way Catholic priests were being formed. In the years that followed, there was a significant decline in the number of vocations to the Catholic priesthood, and a large number of priests left the priesthood. At that time the Seminary of Bogotá became notable nationally because few dioceses in the time after Vatican II had enough vocations to support their own seminary. The seminary benefited from professors from foreign countries, as a result of its sponsorship by the Sulpicians, as well as seminarians from many different areas of Colombia, often places that could not support a seminary of their own. From about 1965 until 1985, the seminary served students from the departments of Santander, Boyacá, Cauca, Amazonas, Putumayo, Cundinamarca, Valle del Cauca, Tolima, Meta, and other regions. There were also seminarians from Venezuela, Peru and Central America.

With the completion of Vatican II and the arrival of the Sulpicians, both the atmosphere and educational style of the seminary changed. A larger emphasis was placed on getting to know the people that a future priest will serve, and concern about social causes became more prominent. The environment became more similar to that of a university, although the rector still holds direct leadership and responsibility of all training.

=== Since 1980 ===
In 1980, the Society of Saint-Sulpice left the seminary, turning its administration back over to diocesan clergy. Today, the Major Seminary of Bogotá is administered by priests of the Archdiocese of Bogotá, with visiting educators, both clergy and laity, who have greater expertise in various subjects that are part of the seminary curriculum. Most of the priests on faculty have advanced degrees in specialized subjects from European universities, especially the Pontifical Gregorian University in Rome, which is run by the Jesuits.

In 2016, the Major Seminary of Bogotá celebrated the 70th anniversary of the completion of the seminary building. The festivities began on 19 March 2016, the Saint Joseph's Day, with a "Feast of Families," in which families of seminarians were invited for a meal, and later a Mass.

== Campus ==
In 1943, Archbishop Ismael Perdomo Borrero commenced the construction of the new building of the Major Seminary of Bogotá, designed by architect José Maria Montoya Valenzuela. The building, a four-story red brick Romanesque edifice, was completed in 1946 in the Chico neighborhood of Bogotá, in the eastern hills of the city. The land on which the seminary was built was donated by Enrique Pérez Hoyos and Mercedes Sierra de Pérez.

== Rectors ==
- Rev. Dr. Indalecio Barreto Martínez (1868–1871)
- Mgr. Bernardo Herrera Restrepo (1871–1885)
- Rev. Dr. Joaquín Gómez Otero (1885–1895)
- Rev. Manuel Maria Camargo (1895–1912)
- Rev. Jose Eusebio Diaz (1913–1919)
- Rev. Emilio Valenzuela (1920–1935)
- Rev. Jose Manuel Diaz (1935–1950)
- Rev. Jesús Martínez Vargas (1951–1952)
- Rev. Alfredo Rubio Díaz (1953)
- Rev. Carlos Ortega Bermúdez (1953–1960)
- Rev. Alfredo Morin, PSS (1961–1966)
- Rev. Gerardo Yelle, PSS (1967)
- Rev. Rodrigo Arango Velásquez, PSS (1967–1974)
- Rev. Alfredo Botero Maya, PSS (1975–1980)
- Rev. Gabriel Romero Franco (1980–1986)
- Rev. Oscar Urbina Ortega (1986–1994)
- Rev. Héctor Cubillos Peña (1994–1996)
- Rev. Jesús María Rincón Rojas (1996–2000)
- Rev. Jose Roberto Ospina Leongómez (2001–2006)
- Rev. Luis Augusto Campos Flórez (2006–2010)
- Rev. Germán Medina Acosta (2010–2014)
- Rev. Leonardo Cárdenas Téllez (July 2014– )

== Notable alumni ==
The Seminary of Bogotá has produced dozens of alumni who have gone on to become bishops, archbishops, and cardinals. They are listed below:

- Hernán Alvarado Solano, titular bishop and Vicar Apostolic of Guapi 2001–2011
- Jorge Ardila Serrano, Bishop of Girardot 1988–2001
- Emilio Brigard Ortiz, titular archbishop and Auxiliary Bishop of Bogotá 1944–1986
- José Gabriel Calderón, Auxiliary Bishop of Bogotá 1958–1962 and Bishop of Cartago 1962–1995
- Daniel Caro Borda, Auxiliary Bishop of Bogotá 2000–2003 and Bishop of Soacha 2003–2016
- Luis Concha Córdoba, Cardinal-Archbishop of Bogotá 1959–1972
- Pablo Correa León, Auxiliary Bishop of Bogotá 1957–1959 and Bishop of Cúcuta 1959–1970
- Héctor Cubillos Peña, Auxiliary Bishop of Bucaramanga 2002–2004 and Bishop of Zipaquirá 2004–present
- Mario E. Dorsonville, Auxiliary Bishop of Washington, DC
- José Daniel Falla Robles, Auxiliary Bishop of Cali 2009–2016 and Bishop of Soacha 2016–present
- Fernando Sabogal Viana, Auxiliary Bishop of Bogotá 1996–2013
- Joaquín García Ordoñez, Coadjutor Bishop of Santa Rosa de Osos 1969–1971 and Bishop of Santa Rosa de Osos 1971–1995
- Ciro Gómez Serrano, Bishop of Girardot 1961–1972, Coadjutor Bishop of Socorro y San Gil 1972–1975 and Bishop of Zipaquirá 1975–1980
- Héctor Gutiérrez Pabón, Auxiliary Bishop of Cali 1987–1998, Bishop of Chiquinquirá 1998–2003 and Bishop of Engativá 2003–2015
- Bishop Victor Lopez Forero, Auxiliary Bishop of Bogotá 1977–1980, Bishop of Socorro y San Gil 1980–1985, Bishop of the Military Ordinariate of Colombia 1985–1994, Bishop of Nueva Pamplona 1994–1998 and Bishop of Bucaramanga 1998–2009
- Alfonso López Trujillo, Cardinal-Archbishop of Medellín 1979–1991
- Crisanto Luque Sánchez, Cardinal-Archbishop of Bogotá 1950–1959
- José Manuel Marroquín, 27th President of Colombia, studied literature and philosophy at the seminary in the 1840s
- Gabriel Montalvo Higuera, titular archbishop and Apostolic Nuncio to the United States 1998–2005
- Francisco Antonio Nieto Sua, Auxiliary Bishop of Bogotá 2008–2011, Bishop of San José del Guaviare 2011–2015 and Bishop of Engativá 2015–present
- Alvaro Ortiz Carrillo, Auxiliary Bishop of Bogotá 1986–1989, Coadjutor Bishop of Garagoa 1989–1989 and Bishop of Garagoa 1989–2000
- Ismael Perdomo Borrero, Bishop of Ibagué 1903–1923, Coadjutor Archbishop of Bogotá 1923–1928 and Archbishop of Bogotá 1928–1950
- José de Jesús Pimiento Rodríguez, Cardinal-Archbishop of Manizales 1975–1996
- Jaime Prieto Amaya, Bishop of Barrancabermeja 1993–2009 and Bishop of Cúcuta 2009–2010
- Mario Revollo Bravo, Cardinal-Archbishop of Bogotá 1984–1994
- Gabriel Romero Franco, Auxiliary Bishop of Bogotá 1977–1986 and Bishop of Facatativá 1986–2010
- Alfredo Rubio Diaz, Auxiliary Bishop of Santa Marta 1953–1956, Bishop of Girardot 1956–1961, Bishop of Sonsón 1961–1968 and Archbishop of Nueva Pamplona 1968–1978
- Héctor Rueda Hernández, Archbishop of Medellín 1991–1997
- José Ruiz Arenas, Auxiliary Bishop of Bogotá 1996–2002 and Archbishop of Villavicencio 2002–2004
- Enrique Sarmiento Angulo, Auxiliary Bishop of Bogotá 1986–2003 and Bishop of Fontibón 2003–2011
- Fabio Suescún Mutis, Auxiliary Bishop of Bogotá 1986–1993, Bishop of Pereira 1993–2001 and Bishop of the Military Ordinariate of Colombia 2001–present
- José Roberto Ospina Leongómez, Auxiliary Bishop of Bogotá 2004–2012 and Bishop of Buga 2012–present
- Oscar Urbina Ortega, Auxiliary Bishop of Bogotá 1996–1999, Bishop of Cúcuta 1999–2008 and Archbishop of Villavicencio 2008–present
- Alberto Uribe Urdaneta, Auxiliary Bishop of Manizales 1954–1957, Bishop of Sonsón 1957–1960, Bishop of Cali 1960–1964 and Archbishop of Cali 1964–1985

== Notable faculty ==
- Cardinal Luis Concha Córdoba, served as a prefect of studies, professor of Sacred Scripture and moral theology, and spiritual director at the seminary during the 1910s and 1920s
- Cardinal Marc Ouellet, PSS, was a professor of philosophy at the seminary 1970–1971
- Archbishop Bernardo Herrera Restrepo, Rector 1871–1885
- Archbishop Oscar Urbina Ortega, Rector 1986–1994
- Bishop Indalecio Barreto Martínez, Rector 1868–1871
- Bishop Emilio de Brigard Ortiz, taught in the early 20th-century
- Bishop Jesús Martínez Vargas, Rector 1951–1952
- Bishop Alfredo Rubio Díaz, Rector 1953
- Bishop Rodrigo Arango Velásquez, PSS, Rector 1967–1974
- Bishop Gabriel Romero Franco, Rector 1980–1986
- Bishop Mario E. Dorsonville, was a professor of pastoral counseling and catechesis at the seminary 1995–1996
- Bishop Héctor Cubillos Peña, Rector 1994–1996
- Rev. Diego Jaramillo, Eudist priest and major figure of the Catholic Charismatic Renewal in Colombia, was a professor at the seminary during the 1960s
- Miguel Abadía Méndez, President of Colombia 1926–1930, was a Latin professor at the seminary during the early 20th century

== See also ==
- List of Roman Catholic seminaries
