= Francisco Antonio Nieto Súa =

Colombian Catholic bishop (1948–2026)

The Most Reverend Francisco Antonio Nieto Súa
- Bishop Emeritus of Engativá
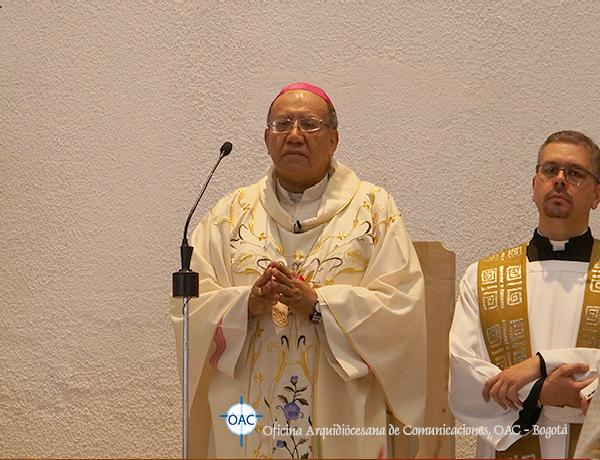
- Nieto Súa in 2015
- Church: Catholic Church
- Archdiocese: Bogotá
- Diocese: Engativá
- Appointed: 26 June 2015
- Installed: 27 July 2015
- Retired: 29 June 2024
- Predecessor: Héctor Gutiérrez Pabón
- Successor: Germán Medina Acosta
- Previous posts: Titular Bishop of Teglata in Numidia (2008–2011); Bishop of San José del Guaviare (2011–2015)

Orders
- Ordination: 30 November 1973 by Aníbal Muñoz Duque
- Consecration: 17 November 2008 by Pedro Rubiano Sáenz, Aldo Cavalli and Héctor Gutiérrez Pabón

Personal details
- Born: 17 September 1948 Panqueba, Boyacá Department, Colombia
- Died: 25 August 2026 (aged 77) Bogotá, Colombia
- Education: Major Seminary of Bogotá, Pontifical Gregorian University
- Motto: Amor numquam eveniat
- Coat of arms: Francisco Antonio Nieto Súa's coat of arms

Styles of Francisco Antonio Nieto Súa
- Reference style: His Excellency; The Most Reverend
- Spoken style: Your Excellency
- Religious style: Bishop

Francisco Antonio Nieto Súa (17 September 1948 – 25 August 2026) was a Colombian Catholic prelate who served as Bishop of Engativá from 2015 to 2024. He previously served as Bishop of San José del Guaviare from 2011 to 2015 and as an auxiliary bishop of the Archdiocese of Bogotá from 2008 to 2011, holding the titular see of Teglata in Numidia.

== Early life and education ==
Nieto Súa was born in Panqueba, Boyacá Department on 17 September 1948. He completed his primary education in his hometown and attended the Colegio José Joaquín Ortiz in Tunja for secondary education. He subsequently studied philosophy and theology at the Major Seminary of Saint Joseph of the Archdiocese of Bogotá. From 1980 to 1983, he studied in Rome and obtained a licentiate in Church history from the Pontifical Gregorian University.

== Priesthood ==
Nieto Súa was ordained a priest for the Archdiocese of Bogotá on 30 November 1973 by Cardinal Aníbal Muñoz Duque. He served as parochial vicar of La Sagrada Eucaristía in Bogotá and San Bernardino in Soacha, and later as parish priest of Santa Lucía in Bogotá. From 1983 to 1995 he was director, formator and professor at the Major Seminary of Saint Joseph in Bogotá. He subsequently served as parish priest of San José de Calasanz and, from December 2000, as episcopal vicar for the Espíritu Santo pastoral zone. He also served at various times as an archpriest and as a member of the presbyteral council and college of consultors of the Archdiocese of Bogotá. In 2007, Nieto Súa received the distinction of Chaplain of His Holiness.

== Episcopate ==
On 22 October 2008, Pope Benedict XVI appointed Nieto Súa auxiliary bishop of Bogotá and titular bishop of Teglata in Numidia. He was consecrated a bishop on 17 November 2008.

On 2 February 2011, he was appointed Bishop of San José del Guaviare, succeeding Guillermo Orozco Montoya. He took canonical possession of the diocese on 11 March 2011. In July 2011, the Colombian Episcopal Conference appointed him its delegate to the governing board of the National Learning Service (SENA).

On 26 June 2015, Pope Francis appointed Nieto Súa Bishop of Engativá. He was canonically installed on 27 July 2015.

At the age of 75, Nieto Súa submitted his resignation from the governance of the Diocese of Engativá. On 29 June 2024, Pope Francis accepted his resignation and appointed Germán Medina Acosta as his successor. Nieto Súa remained apostolic administrator of the diocese until Medina Acosta took canonical possession on 23 August 2024, after which he became bishop emeritus.

== Other activities ==
Nieto Súa was a member of the National Academy of Ecclesiastical History and the Academy of Ecclesiastical History of Bogotá. He also had a particular interest in communications and their role in evangelization, serving on the communications commission of the Colombian Episcopal Conference and participating in the governance of Cristovisión.

== Death ==
Nieto Súa died in Bogotá on 25 August 2026, at the age of 77. The Colombian Episcopal Conference described his ministry as spanning more than five decades and encompassing pastoral service in Bogotá, Soacha, San José del Guaviare and Engativá. His funeral was scheduled for 28 August 2026 at the Cathedral of Saint John the Baptist in Bogotá.

Catholic Church titles
Preceded by Héctor Gutiérrez Pabón	Bishop of Engativá; 2015–2024	Succeeded by Germán Medina Acosta
Preceded by Guillermo Orozco Montoya	Bishop of San José del Guaviare; 2011–2015	Succeeded by Nelson Jair Cardona Ramírez
Preceded by Domenico De Luca	Titular Bishop of Teglata in Numidia; 2008–2011	Succeeded by Ivan Camilleri
