= Roman Catholic Diocese of Chiquinquirá =

Diocese of the Catholic Church in Colombia

Coordinates: 5°37′N 73°48′W

Diocese of Chiquinquirá Dioecesis Chiquinquirensis

Catholic

Location
- Country: Colombia
- Ecclesiastical province: Tunja

Statistics
- Area: 4,019 km^{2} (1,552 sq mi)
- Population: Total; Catholics: (as of 2004); 380,000; 355,000 (93.4%)

Information
- Rite: Latin Rite
- Established: 26 April 1977 (49 years ago)

Current leadership
- Pope: Leo XIV
- Bishop: Ramón Alberto Rolón Güepsa
- Bishops emeritus: Luis Felipe Sánchez Aponte

Map

Website
- www.diocesisdechiquinquira.org

The Roman Catholic Diocese of Chiquinquirá (Latin: Chiquinquirensis) is a diocese located in the city of Chiquinquirá in the ecclesiastical province of Tunja in Colombia.

== History ==
- 26 April 1977: Established as Diocese of Chiquinquirá from the Metropolitan Archdiocese of Tunja

== Ordinaries ==
- Alberto Giraldo Jaramillo, P.S.S. (26 Apr 1977 – 26 Jul 1983) Appointed, Bishop of Cúcuta
- Alvaro Raúl Jarro Tobos † (19 Jun 1984 – 24 Jun 1997) Appointed, Bishop of Colombia, Military
- Héctor Luis Gutiérrez Pabón (2 Feb 1998 – 6 Aug 2003) Appointed, Bishop of Engativá
- Luis Felipe Sánchez Aponte (11 Feb 2004 – 06 Jun 2025)
- Ramón Alberto Rolón Güepsa (06 Jun 2025 – present)

== See also ==
- Roman Catholicism in Colombia
