= Diocese of Fontibón =

Diocese of the Catholic Church in Colombia

Coordinates: 4°40′43″N 74°08′28″W

Diocese of Fontibón Dioecesis Fontibonensis

Catholic

Location
- Country: Colombia
- Ecclesiastical province: Bogotá

Statistics
- Area: 80 km^{2} (31 sq mi)
- Population: Total; Catholics: (as of 2004); 1,350,000; 1,028,700 (76.2%)

Information
- Rite: Latin Rite
- Established: 6 August 2003 (23 years ago)
- Cathedral: St. James the Apostle Cathedral, Fontibón

Current leadership
- Pope: Leo XIV
- Bishop: Juan Vicente Córdoba Villota, S.J.
- Bishops emeritus: Enrique Sarmiento Angulo

Map

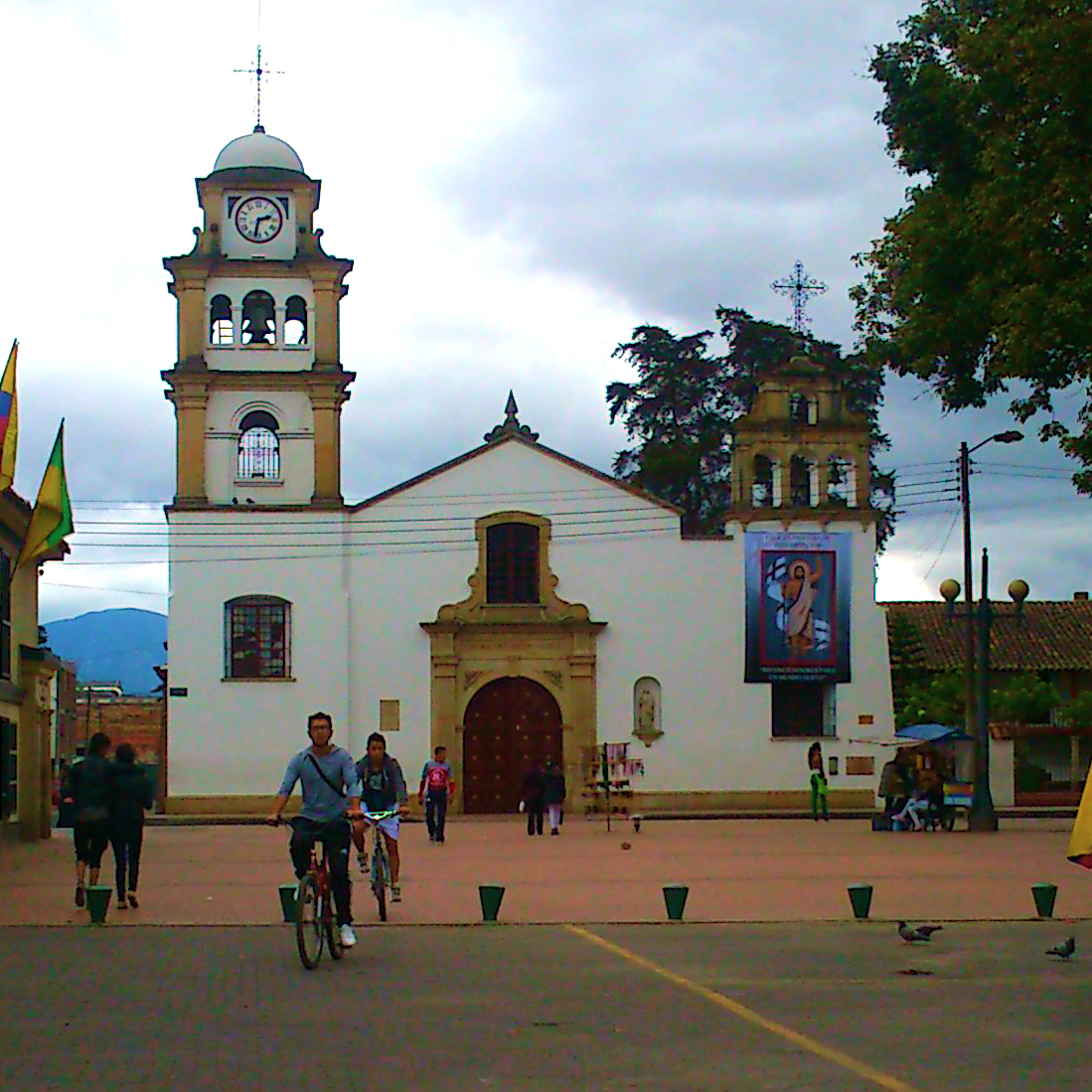
Cathedral of St. James the Apostle

The Roman Catholic Diocese of Fontibón (Latin: Fontibonensis) is a diocese located in the city of Fontibón in the ecclesiastical province of Bogotá in Colombia.

== History ==
- 6 August 2003: Established as Diocese of Fontibón from Metropolitan Archdiocese of Bogotá

== Ordinaries ==
- Enrique Sarmiento Angulo (2003.08.06 – 2011.11.25)
- Juan Vicente Córdoba Villota, S.J. (2011.11.25 – present)

== See also ==
- Roman Catholicism in Colombia
