= Diocese of San José del Guaviare =

Diocese of the Catholic Church in Colombia

Coordinates: 2.5667°N 72.6333°W

Diocese of San José del Guaviare Dioecesis Sancti Iosephi a Guaviare

Catholic

Location
- Country: Colombia
- Ecclesiastical province: Villavicencio

Statistics
- Area: 42,327 km^{2} (16,343 sq mi)
- Population: Total; Catholics: (as of 2004); 120,000; 108,500 (90.4%)

Information
- Denomination: Catholic Church
- Rite: Latin Rite
- Established: 19 January 1989 (37 years ago)
- Cathedral: Catedral San José

Current leadership
- Pope: Leo XIV
- Bishop: Jesús Alberto Torres Ariza

Map

The Roman Catholic Diocese of San José del Guaviare (Latin: Sancti Iosephi a Guaviare) is a diocese located in the city of San José del Guaviare in the ecclesiastical province of Villavicencio in Colombia.

== History ==
- 19 January 1989: Established as Apostolic Vicariate of San José del Guaviare from the Apostolic Prefecture of Mitú
- 29 October 1999: Promoted as Diocese of San José del Guaviare

== Ordinaries ==
Vicars Apostolic of San José del Guaviare

- Belarmino Correa Yepes, M.X.Y. (1989.01.19 – 1999.10.29); see below

Bishops of San José del Guaviare

- Belarmino Correa Yepes, M.X.Y. (1999.10.29 – 2006.01.17); see above
- Guillermo Orozco Montoya (2006.01.17 – 2011.02.02) Appointed, Bishop of Girardota
- Francisco Antonio Nieto Súa (2 February 2011 – 26 June 2015) Appointed, Bishop of Engativá
- Nelson Jair Cardona Ramírez (7 May 2016 – 4 October 2024) Appointed, Bishop of Pereira
- Jesús Alberto Torres Ariza (26 November 2025 – Present)

== See also ==
- Roman Catholicism in Colombia
