= Belarmino Correa Yepes =

Colombian Catholic priest (1930–2020.)

Belarmino Correa Yepes M.X.Y.
- Bishop of San José del Guaviare
- Church: Catholic Church
- Diocese: Diocese of San José del Guaviare
- In office: 19 January 1989 – 17 January 2006
- Predecessor: Vicariate erected
- Successor: Guillermo Orozco Montoya
- Previous posts: Titular Bishop of Horrea Coelia (1989-1999); Prefect of Mitú (1967-1989)

Orders
- Ordination: 15 August 1957
- Consecration: 8 April 1989 by Angelo Acerbi

Personal details
- Born: 14 July 1930 Briceño, Antioquia Department, Colombia
- Died: 20 March 2020 (aged 89) Villavicencio, Meta Department, Colombia

Belarmino Correa Yepes, M.X.Y. (14 July 1930 – 20 March 2020) was a Colombian Roman Catholic bishop.

Correa was born in Colombia and was ordained to the priesthood in 1957. He served as bishop of the Apostolic Vicariate of Mitú, Columbia, from 1967 to 1989, as bishop of the Apostolic Vicariate of the Roman Catholic Diocese of San José del Guaviare, Colombia from 1989 to 1999 and as the first bishop of the San José del Guaviare Diocese from 1999 to 2006.
