= Ismael Perdomo Borrero =

Former Archbishop of Bogotá

Venerable Ismael Perdomo Borrero
- Archbishop of Bogotá
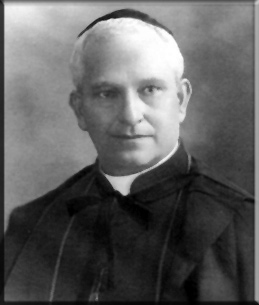
- Church: Roman Catholic Church
- Archdiocese: Bogotá
- See: Bogotá
- Appointed: 2 January 1928
- Installed: 12 February 1929
- Term ended: 3 June 1950
- Predecessor: Bernardo Herrera Restrepo
- Successor: Crisanto Luque Sánchez
- Other posts: President of the Colombian Episcopal Conference (1928-50); Military Vicar of Colombia (1949-50)
- Previous posts: Bishop of Ibagué (1903-23); Secretary of the Colombian Episcopal Conference (1908-19); Coadjutor Archbishop of Bogotá (1923-28); Titular Archbishop of Traianopolis in Rhodope (1923-28)

Orders
- Ordination: 19 December 1896 by Lucido Maria Parocchi
- Consecration: 19 June 1903 by Girolamo Maria Gotti

Personal details
- Born: Ismael Perdomo Borrero; 22 February 1872 Gigante, Huila, Colombia
- Died: 3 June 1950 (aged 78) El Chicó, Bogotá, Colombia
- Education: Pontifical Latin American College; Pontifical Gregorian University

Sainthood
- Venerated in: Roman Catholic Church
- Title as Saint: Venerable
- Attributes: Episcopal attire

Ordination history of Ismael Perdomo Borrero
History
Priestly ordination
- Ordained by: Lucido Maria Parocchi
Episcopal consecration
- Principal consecrator: Girolamo Maria Gotti
- Co-consecrators: Giuseppe Maria Costantini; Esteban Rojas Tobar
Episcopal succession
Bishops consecrated by Ismael Perdomo Borrero as principal consecrator
- Santos Ballestreros y López O.A.R.: 15 May 1921
- Luis Concha Córdoba: 30 November 1935
- Emilio de Brigard Ortiz: 3 September 1944

Ismael Perdomo Borrero (22 February 1872 - 3 June 1950) was a Colombian Roman Catholic prelate who served as the Archbishop of Bogotá from 1928 until his death. Borrero studied in both Rome and Paris before returning to his homeland to serve as a bishop not long after he was ordained as a priest; he served in the national episcopal conference and was in 1923 made the coadjutor for the Bogotá archdiocese. But the national government frowned upon his succession to the archbishopric in 1928 and more so after his involvement in the 1930 presidential election seeing his favored candidate lose. Borrero was known for his energetic approach to fostering social and charitable initiatives and towards the end of his tenure sought to establish new parishes and reorganize their structure.

The late prelate became lauded for his holiness in addition to his virtue allowing his successor to initiate the beatification process. This cause culminated decades later in mid-2017 after Pope Francis confirmed his heroic virtue and titling him as Venerable.

== Life ==
Ismael Perdomo Borrero was born on 22 February 1872 in the Huila Department to Gabriel Perdomo Cuenca and María Francisca Borrero Silva.

He completed his high school education in Neiva before he commenced his ecclesial studies in Bogotá in 1889 though later transferred his studies to Rome in 1895 in the Pontifical Latin American College. Borrero received his ordination to the priesthood on 19 December 1896 from Lucido Maria Parocchi in the Basilica of Saint John Lateran before remaining in Rome to continue with further studies. He obtained his doctorate in sacred theological studies from the Pontifical Gregorian University on 20 July 1897 and did additional studies at Saint Sulpice college in Paris. Borrero returned to Neiva in his homeland in 1899 before becoming the vice-rector for Garzón in the Huila Department thus seeing him monitor the education of seminarians; he was later made chancellor for the Tolima diocese.

His rise in the ranks culminated on 8 June 1903 after Pope Leo XIII appointed Borrero to be the first Bishop of Ibagué; he received his episcopal consecration in Rome on 19 June from Girolamo Maria Gotti in the chapel of the Pontifical Latin American College. The principal co-consecrators were Archbishop Giuseppe Maria Costantini and Bishop Esteban Rojas Tobar. He served from 1908 until 1919 as the secretary for the Colombian Episcopal Conference while Pope Pius XI named him on 5 February 1923 to be both the coadjutor for the Bogotá archdiocese in addition to Titular Archbishop of Traianopolis in Rhodope. This former appointment meant that Borrero would become the see's archbishop upon the death or resignation of the current prelate and he was enthroned as coadjutor on 7 October 1923. He succeeded as archbishop on 2 January 1928 while in May 1928 he was made an Assistant to the Pontifical Throne thus being granted the title of "monsignor". On 12 February 1929 he was enthroned in his see and received the pallium from the apostolic nuncio Paolo Giobbe. He made several pastoral visits throughout his tenure but would delegate others to do those visits on his behalf when his health in the late 1940s began failing. From 1928 until his death he served as the president for the national episcopal conference.

The national government was not too pleased with Borrero becoming the archbishop and more so after his involvement in the 1930 presidential election that saw his favored conservative candidate Alfredo Vásquez Cobo lose. In 1934 he asked to have a bishop appointed to his see in order to aid him in his duties thus resulting in the appointment of the coadjutor Juan Manuel González Arbeláez. But Arbeláez was moved in 1942 to another archdiocese thus leaving Borrero on his own to manage the administration of his archdiocese.

In his archdiocese he became tireless in promoting both social and charitable initiatives and was known for his humble but energetic approach to archdiocesan affairs and the promotion of the faith. He created more than 50 new parishes and helped reorganize their structure. Pope Pius XII named him on 13 October 1949 to serve as the first Military Vicar of Colombia which was a position he held until his death. The destruction of the episcopal residence on 9 April 1948 forced Borrero to live with seminarians at their residence where he would live until his death.

In March 1950 his health - which was precarious for sometime - had taken a decline. He had celebrated his last Mass at Easter and on 27 April received the last rites from the chargé d'affaires Sebastiano Baggio. Borrero died in El Chicó on 3 June 1950 on 9:15am and as per his last will was interred in the chapel of the Immaculate Conception in the archdiocesan cathedral.

== Beatification process ==
The informative process for the beatification cause launched in the late prelate's archdiocese on 31 January 1962 and concluded just a few months later on 12 September; the cause remained inactive until it was reopened on 1 June 1979 thus allowing for a second local investigation to be opened on 10 May 1982. The Congregation for the Causes of Saints validated this process later on 27 February 1986 in Rome.

Borrero became titled Venerable on 7 July 2017 after Pope Francis confirmed that the late archbishop had practiced heroic virtue during his life.
