= Juan Vicente Córdoba Villota =

Roman Catholic bishop

His Excellency Juan Vicente Córdoba Villota
- Bishop of Fontibón
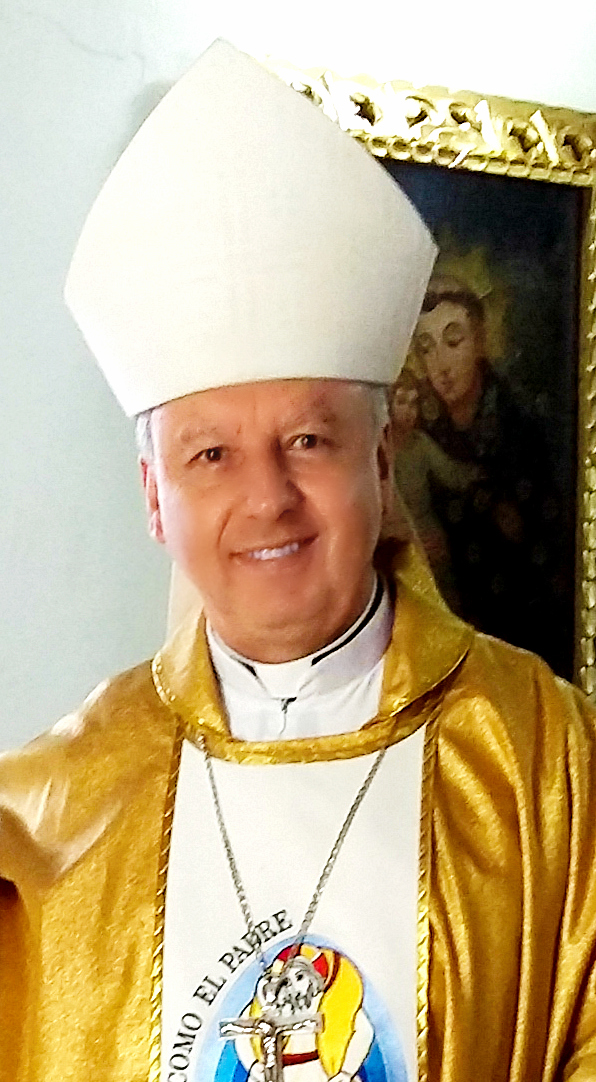
- Bishop Juan Vicente Córdoba Villota
- Diocese: Fontibón
- See: Fontibón
- Appointed: 25 November 2011
- Predecessor: Enrique Sarmiento Angulo

Orders
- Ordination: 19 October 1979
- Consecration: 28 August 2004 by Beniamino Stella

Personal details
- Born: 23 July 1951 Quito, Ecuador
- Denomination: Roman Catholic
- Coat of arms

Juan Vicente Córdoba Villota SJ (born 23 July 1951) is a Roman Catholic Jesuit prelate, whose episcopal activity has been in Colombia, and Bishop of Fontibón. He is currently the only Jesuit bishop in Colombia.

== Life ==
=== Early life and education ===
Córdoba was born in Quito, Ecuador, when his parents, Colombian General Juan Bautista Córdoba Álvarez, secretary general of the Presidency of the Republic (Military Junta) with presidential immunity, and Leonor Villota Zambrano, were part of the diplomatic service at the Colombian embassy in Quito.

A graduate of the Liceo de Cervantes in Bogotá, Córdoba entered the Society of Jesus and professed his vows on June 20, 1969, at the age of 17.

=== Priesthood ===
After completing his ecclesiastical studies, Córdoba was ordained a priest at the age of 28, on 19 October 1979. Finally, at the age of 36, he made his solemn profession of four vows on 2 February 1988. During his time in the Society of Jesus, he held various positions:

- Formator of Junior and Philosophy Students of the Society of Jesus in Colombia (1990–1994)
- Rector of Colegio San Pedro Claver in Bucaramanga (1994–2000)
- National president of CONACED (National Catholic Confederation of Education) (2000–2001)
- Professor of History, Psychology, and Bioethics; dean of University Life at the Faculty of Medicine of the Pontifical Javeriana University of Bogotá (2002–2004)
- Corresponding member of the Santander Academy of History
- Honorary member of the Society Bolivarian Republic of Colombia

=== Episcopate ===
==== Auxiliary bishop of Bucaramanga ====
On 30 June 2004, Pope John Paul II appointed Córdoba titular bishop of Ausuccura and auxiliary bishop of the Archdiocese of Bucaramanga. He was consecrated by the Apostolic Nuncio to Colombia, Beniamino Stella, on August 28 of the same year in the Metropolitan Cathedral Basilica of Bogotá, primate of Colombia.

He participated as a delegate of the Episcopal Conference of Colombia in the Fifth General Conference of the Latin American and Caribbean Episcopal Council (CELAM), in Aparecida, Brazil, 13–31 May 2007.

On 8 July 2009, Córdoba was appointed secretary general of the Episcopal Conference of Colombia.

==== Bishop of Fontibón ====
On 25 November 2011, Pope Benedict XVI accepted the resignation of Bishop Enrique Sarmiento Angulo and appointed Córdoba as the second bishop of Fontibón. He took canonical possession of the diocese on 11 February 2012.

Córdoba participated in the Ad Limina Apostolorum visit of the Colombian bishops in June 2012.

As bishop of Fontibón, he called for a return to spirituality when commenting on the issue of intolerance and violence in Colombia.

== See also ==
- Roman Catholicism in Colombia
