= Apostolic Vicariate of Mitú =

Catholic missionary jurisdiction in Colombia

Apostolic Vicariate of Mitú Apostolicus Vicariatus Mituensis

Location
- Country: Colombia

Statistics
- Area: 54,000 km^{2} (21,000 sq mi)
- Population: Total; Catholics: (as of 2010); 29,400; 23,300 (79.3%)
- Parishes: 9

Information
- Denomination: Catholic Church
- Rite: Roman Rite
- Established: 9 June 1949 (75 years ago)
- Cathedral: Catedral María Inmaculada

Current leadership
- Pope: Leo XIV
- Vicar Apostolic: Medardo de Jesús Henao del Río

Map

The Vicariate Apostolic of Mitú (Latin: Apostolicus Vicariatus Mituensis) is a Latin pre-diocesan jurisdiction of the Catholic Church in Colombia.

It is exempt, i.e. immediately subject to the Holy See (not part of any ecclesiastical province) and depends on the missionary Roman Congregation for the Evangelization of Peoples.

Its cathedral episcopal see is the Catedral María Inmaculada, dedicated to Mary Immaculate, in the city of Mitú, in Vaupés Department.

== Statistics ==
As per 2014, it pastorally served 15,200 Catholics (38.0% of 40,000 total) on 54,135 km² in 9 parishes and 12 missions with 27 priests (16 diocesan, 11 religious), 1 deacon, 15 lay religious (11 brothers, 4 sisters) and 6 seminarians.

== History ==
On 9 June 1949 Pope Pius XII established the Apostolic Prefecture of Mitú on territory split off from the Apostolic Vicariate of Los Llanos de San Martín.

It lost split-off territory on 19 January 1989 when the Apostolic Vicariate of San José del Guaviare (now a diocese) was created.

On 19 June 1989 Pope John Paul II elevated it to a Vicariate Apostolic (entitled to a titular bishop) and named it the Apostolic Vicariate of Mitú-Puerto Inírida.

It was split in two on 30 November 1996, creating the hence renamed Apostolic Vicariate of Mitú and the split-off Apostolic Vicariate of Inírida.

== Ordinaries ==
(all Roman Rite; so far members of a Latin missionary congregation)

Apostolic Prefects of Mitú

- Gerardo Valencia Cano, Yarumal Society for the Foreign Missions (M.X.Y.) † (19 July 1949 – 24 March 1953); later Titular Bishop of Rhesaina (1953.03.24 – 1972.01.21) as Apostolic Vicar of Buenaventura (Colombia) (1953.03.24 – 1972.01.21)
- Heriberto Correa Yepes, M.X.Y. † (11 Nov 1953 – Dec 1966 Resigned); later Titular Bishop of Rhesaina (1973.01.29 – death 2010.09.09) as Apostolic Vicar of Buenaventura (Colombia) (1973.01.29 – 1996.11.30) and on emeritate
- Belarmino Correa Yepes, M.X.Y. † (30 Oct 1967 – 19 Jan 1989); later Titular Bishop of Horrea Cœlia (1989.01.19 – 1999.10.29) as last Apostolic Vicar of San José del Guaviare (Colombia) (1989.01.19 – 1999.10.29), promoted first Bishop of the same Buenaventura (1999.10.29 – retired 2006.01.17)

Apostolic Vicar of Mitú–Puerto Inírida

- José Gustavo Angel Ramírez, M.X.Y. † (19 June 1989 – 30 Nov. 1996.11.30 see below), Titular Bishop of Vescera (1989.06.19 – death 2013.02.23)

Apostolic Vicars of Mitú

- José Gustavo Angel Ramírez, M.X.Y. † (see above 30 Nov. 1996.11.30 – retired 17 Sept. 2009)
- Msgr. Damián Electo Chavarría Carvajal, M.X.Y., Pro-Vicar Apostolic of Mitú (Colombia) (2009 – 2013.11.23), no other prelature
- Medardo de Jesús Henao del Río, M.X.Y. (2013.11.23 – ...), Titular Bishop of Casæ Medianæ (2013.11.23 – ...)

== See also ==
- List of Roman Catholic dioceses in Colombia
- Roman Catholicism in Colombia
