= Víctor Manuel Ochoa Cadavid =

Colombian Roman Catholic bishop (1962–2025)

His Excellency Víctor Manuel Ochoa Cadavid
- Military Bishop of Colombia
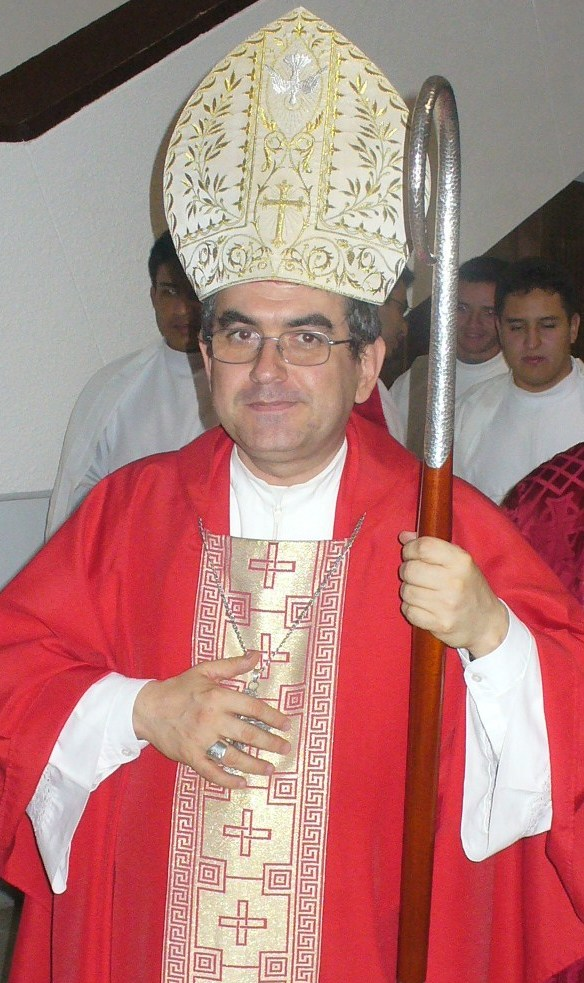
- Appointed: December 7, 2020
- Term ended: June 1, 2025
- Predecessor: Fabio Suescún Mutis
- Successor: Vacant
- Previous posts: Auxiliary Bishop of Medellín and Titular Bishop of San Leone (2006–2011); Bishop of Málaga-Soatá (2011–2015); Bishop of Cúcuta (2015–2020)

Orders
- Ordination: July 5, 1986 by Pope John Paul II
- Consecration: April 1, 2006 by Giovanni Battista Re

Personal details
- Born: October 18, 1962 Bello, Antioquia, Colombia
- Died: June 1, 2025 (aged 62)
- Motto: In nomine Iesu Christi
- Coat of arms

Styles of Víctor Manuel Ochoa Cadavid
- Reference style: His Excellency; The Most Reverend
- Spoken style: Your Excellency
- Religious style: Bishop

Víctor Manuel Ochoa Cadavid (October 18, 1962 – June 1, 2025) was a Colombian Catholic bishop, philosopher and academic. He was auxiliary bishop of Medellín (2006–2011), bishop of Málaga-Soatá (2011–2015), bishop of Cúcuta (2015–2020) and military ordinary of Colombia (2020–2025).

== Biography ==
Ochoa was ordained a priest on July 5, 1986, at the hands of Pope John Paul II, in Medellín, during his apostolic visit to Colombia, being incardinated in the archdiocese of Medellín.

On July 24, 2015, Pope Francis appointed him bishop of Cúcuta.

On December 7, 2020, he was appointed military bishop of Colombia. He took canonical possession on January 30, 2021, during a ceremony at the Military Cathedral of Colombia.

=== Personal life and death ===
Ochoa Cadavid had a sister, Luz Helena Ochoa Cadavid, that died in 2021.

On May 8, 2025, Archbishop Paolo Rudelli presided over a Mass for the health and speedy recovery of Bishop Ochoa Cadavid. He died on the night of June 1, 2025, at 11:55 p.m., after several months in a delicate state of health. He was 62.

Catholic Church titles
Preceded by Fabio Suescún Mutis	Military Bishop of Colombia; 2020–2025	Succeeded by Vacant
Preceded by Julio César Vidal Ortiz	Bishop of Cúcuta; 2015–2020	Succeeded by José Libardo Garcés Monsalve
Preceded by Darío de Jesús Monsalve Mejía	Bishop of Málaga-Soatá; 2011–2015	Succeeded by José Libardo Garcés Monsalve
Preceded by Stanisław Dziwisz	Titular Bishop of San Leone; 2006–2011	Succeeded by Prosper Grech
Preceded by —	Auxiliary Bishop of Medellín; 2006–2001	Succeeded by —
