= Oscar Urbina Ortega =

Catholic archbishop

The Most Reverend Oscar Urbina Ortega
- Archbishop Emeritus of Villavicencio
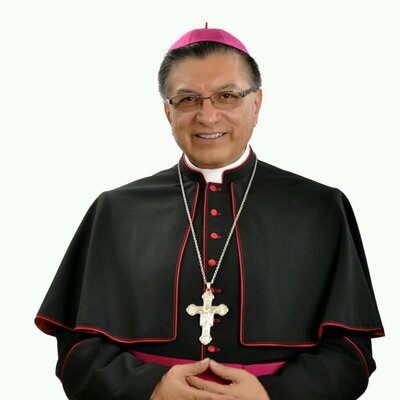
- Church: Roman Catholic Church
- Archdiocese: Villavicencio
- See: Villavicencio
- Appointed: 30 November 2007
- Installed: 25 January 2008
- Retired: 22 April 2022
- Predecessor: José Ruiz Arenas
- Successor: Misael Vacca Ramirez
- Other post: President of the Colombian Episcopal Conference (2017-2021)
- Previous posts: Titular Bishop of Forconio (1996-99); Auxiliary Bishop of Bogotá (1996-99); Bishop of Cúcuta (1999-2007); Vice-President of the Colombian Episcopal Conference (2014-17)

Orders
- Ordination: 30 November 1973 by Aníbal Muñoz Duque
- Consecration: 13 April 1996 by Pedro Rubiano Sáenz

Personal details
- Born: Oscar Urbina Ortega; 13 April 1947 (age 79) Arboledas, Norte de Santander, Colombia

Styles of Oscar Urbina Ortega
- Reference style: The Most Reverend
- Spoken style: Your Excellency
- Religious style: Monsignor
- Posthumous style: not applicable

Oscar Urbina Ortega (born 13 April 1947) is a Colombian prelate of the Roman Catholic Church who served as the second Archbishop of Villavicencio from 2007 to 2022.

== Biography ==
Oscar Urbina Ortega was born in Arboledas, and ordained to the priesthood by Archbishop Aníbal Muñoz Duque on 30 November 1973. From 1986 to 1994 he was Rector of the Major Seminary of Bogotá, the main seminary of the Archdiocese of Bogotá.

On March 8, 1996, he was appointed Auxiliary Bishop of Bogotá and Titular Bishop of Forconium by Pope John Paul II. He received his episcopal consecration on the following 13 April from Archbishop Pedro Rubiano Sáenz, with Archbishops Paolo Romeo and Tarcisio Bertone, SDB, serving as co-consecrators. Urbina was later named Bishop of Cúcuta on 9 November 1999.

Pope Benedict XVI later named him the second Archbishop of Villavicencio on 30 November 2007, the thirty-fourth anniversary of his priestly ordination. Urbina succeeded José Ruiz Arenas, who was made a bishop in the same ceremony as the former in 1996, and was formally installed as Archbishop on 25 January 2008. On 23 April 2022, Pope Francis accepted Urbinas's retirement as archbishop of Villavicencio and named Bishop Misael Vacca Ramirez from the Diocese of Duitama-Sogamoso to succeed him.

Preceded by Jesús Salazar Gómez	Bishop of Cúcuta; 1999–2007	Succeeded by Jaime Prieto Amaya
Preceded by José Ruiz Arenas	Archbishop of Villavicencio; 2007–present	Succeeded by incumbent
