= Hernán Alvarado Solano =

- Vicar Apostolic of Guapi
- Church: Catholic Church
- See: Apostolic Vicariate of Guapi
- In office: 13 February 2001 – 31 January 2011
- Predecessor: Rafael Morales Duque (as Prefect of Guapi)
- Successor: Carlos Correa Martínez
- Other post: Titular Bishop of Tubunae in Mauretania (2001-2011)

Orders
- Ordination: 4 December 1971
- Consecration: 24 March 2001 by Jorge Enrique Jiménez Carvajal

Personal details
- Born: 26 January 1946 Bogotá, Colombia
- Died: 31 January 2011 (aged 65)

Hernán Alvarado Solano (26 January 1946 – 31 January 2011) was the Catholic bishop of the Apostolic Vicariate of Guapi, Colombia. As a young boy, he studied at the Minor Seminary Nuestra Señora de la Asunción of Zipaquirá.

He was a quiet boy with a strong and firm character. He was observant of the world around him. He studied philosophy and theology at the Major Seminary of Bogotá.

Ordained in 1971, Hernán Alvarado Solano was appointed in 2001as bishop of the Vicar Apostolic of Guapi. When he died, he was bishop of his mission territory, a remote area of Colombia, cultural and politically.
