= Enrique Sarmiento =

Colombian Roman Catholic bishop (born 1934)

Monsignor Enrique Sarmiento Angulo
- Church: Roman Catholic Church
- Archdiocese: Bogotá
- Diocese: Fontibón
- Appointed: 6 August 2003
- In office: 2003–2011
- Predecessor: Diocese established
- Successor: Juan Vicente Córdoba Villota

Orders
- Ordination: 24 October 1958 by Crisanto Luque Sánchez
- Consecration: 13 June 1986 by Mario Revollo Bravo

Personal details
- Born: 1 June 1934 (age 92) Bogotá, Colombia
- Education: Pontifical Gregorian University

Enrique Sarmiento Angulo (born 1 June 1934) is a Colombian Roman Catholic prelate who served as the first Bishop of Fontibón from 2003 until his retirement in 2011. Previously, he served as an auxiliary bishop of the Archdiocese of Bogotá (1986–2003) and as apostolic administrator of the archdiocese (1994–1995).

== Early life and education ==
Sarmiento Angulo was born in Bogotá, Colombia, on 1 June 1934. He attended the Colegio Nacional de San Bartolomé before studying philosophy at the Archdiocesan Seminary of Bogotá. He subsequently continued his theological education at the Pontifical Gregorian University in Rome, where he obtained a licentiate in theology.

He belonged to a family of nine children. His parents were Eduardo Sarmiento Pulido and Georgina Angulo. His older brother is businessman Luis Carlos Sarmiento Angulo, one of Colombia's billionaire businessman and banker.

== Ecclesiastical career ==
=== Priesthood ===
Sarmiento Angulo was ordained a priest in Rome on 24 October 1958 by Crisanto Luque Sánchez and was incardinated into the Archdiocese of Bogotá.

From 1959 to 1966, he served as prefect and professor at the Minor Seminary of Bogotá. Between 1964 and 1966, he also directed the Archdiocesan Vocations Office. From 1967 to 1971, he was parish priest of San Fernando Rey in Bogotá and simultaneously served as chaplain of the Instituto Pedagógico Nacional from 1967 to 1976. He subsequently coordinated the principals and chaplains of schools within the archdiocese between 1971 and 1976.

From 1977 to 1985, he served as episcopal vicar of the southern zone of Bogotá. He also worked with the Instituto San Pablo Apóstol, an institution dedicated to education and social services for disadvantaged families.

=== Auxiliary Bishop of Bogotá ===
On 3 May 1986, Pope John Paul II appointed Sarmiento Angulo titular bishop of Crepedula and auxiliary bishop of Bogotá. He received episcopal consecration on 13 June 1986, with Archbishop Mario Revollo Bravo as principal consecrator.

During his episcopal ministry in Bogotá, he held several administrative and pastoral positions, including vicar general for administrative affairs and coordinator of prophetic and social pastoral activities. He was also responsible for the Episcopal Pastoral Zone of San Pedro from 1998 to 2003. Within the Colombian Episcopal Conference, he participated in the Episcopal Finance Committee and served as president of the Mutuo Auxilio Sacerdotal Colombiano.

On 13 August 1994, he was appointed apostolic administrator of the Archdiocese of Bogotá. He held this position until 11 February 1995, when Pedro Rubiano Sáenz took possession of the archdiocese as its ordinary.

=== Bishop of Fontibón ===
On 6 August 2003, Pope John Paul II erected the Diocese of Fontibón, separating its territory from the Archdiocese of Bogotá, and appointed Sarmiento Angulo as its first bishop. The newly established diocese comprised the localities of Fontibón and Kennedy in Bogotá. He was installed as bishop of Fontibón on 13 September 2003.

During his episcopate, he served as the first ordinary of the newly created diocese. His appointment marked the beginning of the independent diocesan administration of Fontibón within the ecclesiastical province of Bogotá.

=== Retirement ===
On 25 November 2011, Pope Benedict XVI accepted Sarmiento Angulo's resignation from the pastoral governance of the Diocese of Fontibón, in accordance with canon 401 §1 of the Code of Canon Law. He was succeeded by Juan Vicente Córdoba Villota, who was appointed bishop of the diocese on the same day.

Following his retirement, he continued to participate in Catholic pastoral and educational activities. He also became involved in communicating Catholic social teaching through digital media, including online publications, videos and social networks.

== Personal life ==
Sarmiento Angulo is the younger brother of Colombian businessman Luis Carlos Sarmiento Angulo. According to the Colombian publication Las2Orillas, he has also acted as a spiritual adviser to members of his family, including his brother.

In a 2018 interview with El Catolicismo, published on the occasion of his 60th anniversary of priestly ordination, he reflected on his vocation and his years of ecclesiastical service. The interview highlighted his continued interest in evangelization and the use of contemporary communication platforms to disseminate Catholic teaching.
