= St. John the Baptist Cathedral, Engativá =

St. John the Baptist Cathedral
- Catedral de San Juan Bautista de la Estrada
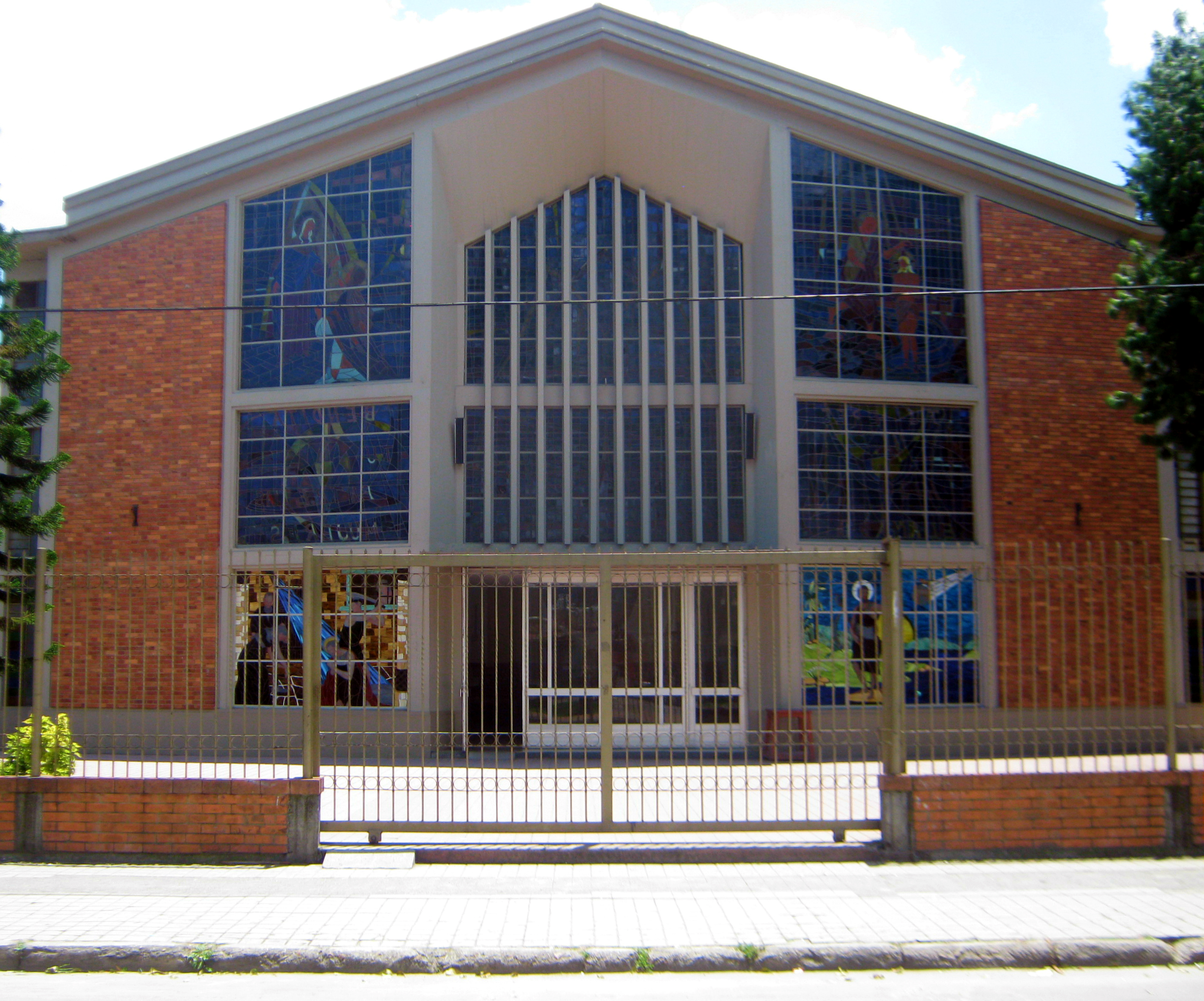
- St. John the Baptist Cathedral
- 4°40′46″N 74°05′33″W
- Location: Engativá
- Country: Colombia
- Denomination: Roman Catholic Church

Administration
- Diocese: Engativá

The St. John the Baptist Cathedral (Spanish: Catedral de San Juan Bautista de la Estrada), also known as Engativá Cathedral, is a cathedral of the Catholic Church in the Engativá locality of Bogotá, Colombia. It is dedicated to Saint John the Baptist. Since 6 August 2003, it is the seat of the Bishop of Engativá by decree of Pope John Paul II. It also takes the name "de la Estrada" by the sector of its location.

== History ==
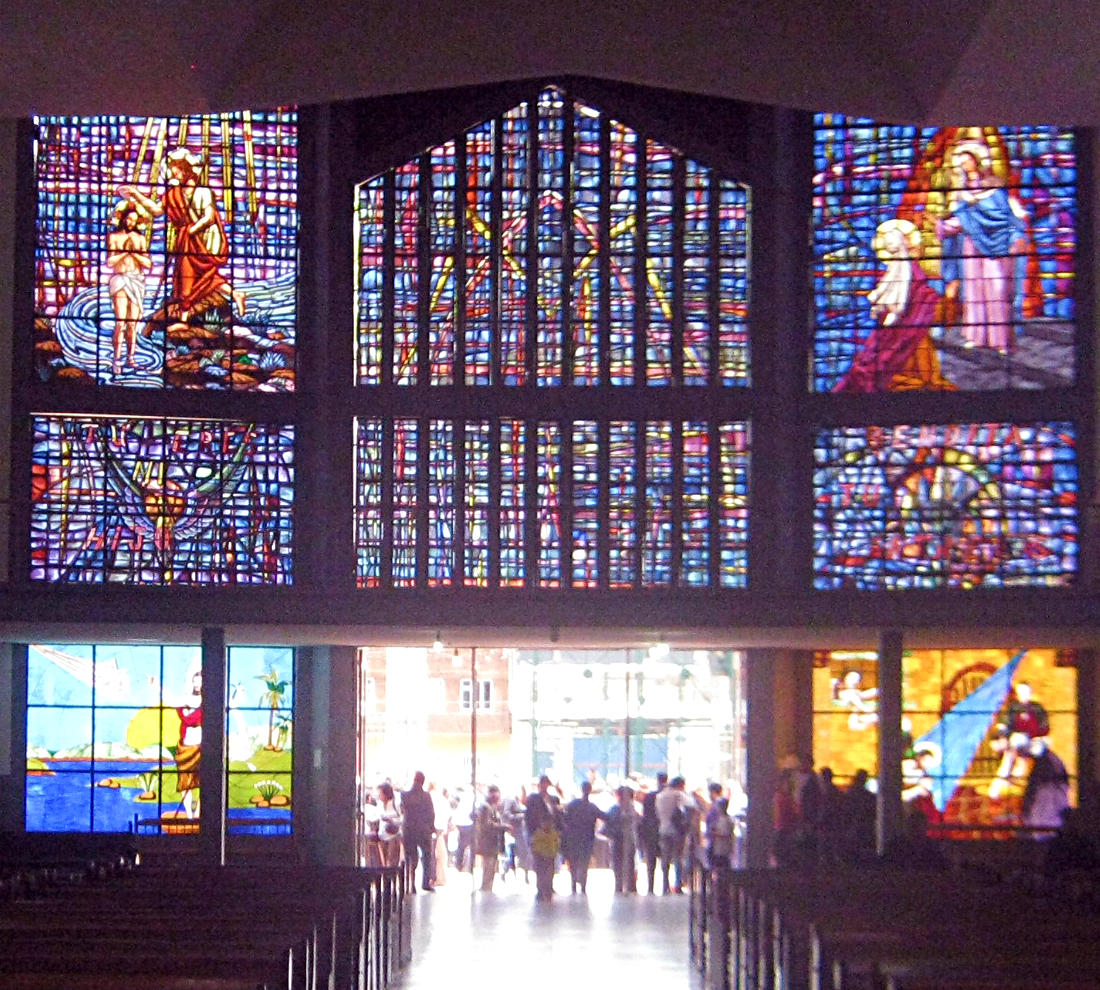
Interior

The Church was originally intended only as a parish church, but after the Diocese of Engativá was separated from the Archdiocese of Bogotá, because of the size and location of the cathedral building, Pope John Paul II, declared it as the Cathedral of the Diocese.

The Cathedral is a rectangular building of approx. 10 m. Of height 12 of width and 60 of depth, with an approximated capacity of 800 people seated and another 400 standing. It has a single nave of walls in "zig zag", presents white marble floors and walls of the same color. The ceiling of 10 meters of height is white and presents / displays several skylights, with metallic structures that support the sky of plaster.

== See also ==
- List of cathedrals in Colombia
- Roman Catholicism in Colombia
- St. John the Baptist
