= Héctor Epalza Quintero =

Colombian Roman Catholic bishop (1940–2021)

Héctor Epalza Quintero PSS
- Bishop of Buenaventura
- Church: Roman Catholic Church
- Diocese: Buenaventura
- Installed: 29 April 2004
- Term ended: 30 June 2017
- Predecessor: Rigoberto Corredor Bermúdez
- Successor: Rubén Darío Jaramillo Montoya

Orders
- Ordination: 14 July 1965
- Consecration: 16 July 2004 by Pedro Rubiano Sáenz

Personal details
- Born: 14 June 1940; Convención, Norte de Santander Department, Colombia
- Died: 2 February 2021 (aged 80); Pereira, Risaralda Department, Colombia

Héctor Epalza Quintero P.S.S. (14 June 1940 – 2 February 2021) was a Colombian Roman Catholic bishop.

Epalza Quintero was born in Colombia and was ordained to the priesthood in 1965. He served as bishop of the Roman Catholic Diocese of Buenaventura, Colombia from 2004 until 2017.
