= Diocese of Buenaventura =

Diocese of the Catholic Church in Colombia

Coordinates: 3.8896°N 77.0770°W

Diocese of Buenaventura Dioecesis Bonaventurensis

Catholic
- Coat of arms of Diocese of Buenaventura

Location
- Country: Colombia
- Ecclesiastical province: Cali

Statistics
- Area: 6,633 km^{2} (2,561 sq mi)
- Population: Total; Catholics: (as of 2006); 400,900; 395,000 (98.5%)

Information
- Rite: Latin Rite
- Established: 14 November 1952 (73 years ago)
- Cathedral: Catedral de San Buenaventura

Current leadership
- Pope: Leo XIV
- Bishop: Rubén Darío Jaramillo Montoya
- Metropolitan Archbishop: Darío de Jesús Monsalve Mejía

Map

The Roman Catholic Diocese of Buenaventura (Latin: Bonaventuren(sis)) is a Latin suffragan diocese in the ecclesiastical province of Cali in Colombia, yet depends on the missionary Roman Congregation for the Evangelization of Peoples.

Its cathedral episcopal see is Catedral de San Buenaventura, dedicated to Saint Bonaventura, in the city of Buenaventura, Valle del Cauca Department.

== History ==
- 14 November 1952: Established as Apostolic Vicariate of Buenaventura, on territories split off from the then Diocese of Cali and Apostolic Prefecture of Tumaco (now a diocese)
- 30 November 1996: Promoted as Diocese of Buenaventura / Bonaventuren(sis) (Latin)

== Statistics ==
As per 2014, it pastorally served 434,000 Catholics (98.0% of 443,000 total) on 6,633 km² in 21 parishes and 84 missions with 38 priests (25 diocesan, 13 religious), 24 lay religious (13 brothers, 11 sisters) and 7 seminarians.

== Episcopal Ordinaries ==
(all Roman rite)

Apostolic Vicars of Buenaventura

- Gerardo Valencia Cano, M.X.Y. (born Vanuatu) (1953.03.24 – death 1972.01.21), Titular Bishop of Rhesaina (1953.03.24 – 1972.01.21), previously Apostolic Prefect of Mitú (Colombia) (1949.07.19 – 1953.03.24)
- Heriberto Correa Yepes, M.X.Y. (first native incumbent) (1973.01.29 – retired 1996.11.30), Titular Bishop of Casæ nigræ (1973.01.29 – death 2010.09.09); previously Apostolic Prefect of Mitú (Colombia) (1953.03.27 – 1967)

Diocesan Bishops of Buenaventura

- Rigoberto Corredor Bermúdez (1996.11.30 – 2003.12.19), previously Titular Bishop of Rusguniæ (1988.02.26 – 1996.11.30) as Auxiliary Bishop of Diocese of Pereira (Colombia) (1988.02.26 – 1996.11.30); later Bishop of Garzón (Colombia) (2003.12.19 – 2011.07.15), Bishop of above Pereira (2011.07.15 – ...)
  - Apostolic Administrator Juan Francisco Sarasti Jaramillo, C.I.M. (2004.02.21 – 2004.04.29), while Metropolitan Archbishop of Cali (Colombia) (2002.08.17 – retired 2011.05.18); previously Titular Bishop of Egara (1978.03.08 – 1983.12.23) as Auxiliary Bishop of Archdiocese of Cali (1978.03.08 – 1983.12.23), Bishop of Barrancabermeja (Colombia) (1983.12.23 – 1993.03.25), Metropolitan Archbishop of Ibagué (Colombia) (1993.03.25 – 2002.08.17)
- Héctor Epalza Quintero, P.S.S. (2004.04.29 – retired 2017.06.30)
- Rubén Darío Jaramillo Montoya (2017.06.30 – ...), no previous prelature.

So far, the diocese had no auxiliary bishops.

== See also ==
- List of Catholic dioceses in Colombia
- Roman Catholicism in Colombia

== Sources and external links ==
- GCatholic.org, with Google satellite photo - data for all sections
- Catholic Hierarchy
