= Nelson Jair Cardona Ramírez =

Colombian cleric of the Roman Catholic Church

- Bishop of Pereira
- In office: December 4, 2024-
- Predecessor: Rigoberto Corredor Bermúdez

Orders
- Ordination: 12 December 1992
- Consecration: 18 June 2016 by Oscar Aníbal Salazar Gómez
- Rank: Prelate

Personal details
- Born: 18 January 1969 (age 57) Norcasia, Colombia
- Denomination: Catholic
- Education: Major Seminary
- Alma mater: Pontifical Gregorian University

Nelson Jair Cardona Ramírez (born 18 January 1969) is a Colombian prelate of the Catholic Church who was the Bishop of San José del Guaviare from 2016 to 2024, since December 4, 2024, he has been the Bishop of the Diocese of Pereira

== Biography ==
Nelson Jair Cardona Ramírez was born in Norcasia on 18 January 1969. He studied at the Major Seminary in Manizales; he earned a licenciate in spiritual theology at the Pontifical Gregorian University and a doctorate in theology from the Theological Pastoral Institute for Latin America (ITEPAL). He was ordained a priest of the Diocese of La Dorada-Guaduas on 12 December 1992.

His assignments have included service as Diocesan Delegate for Youth Ministry, Diocesan Delegate for Vocation Ministry, parish priest of San Antonio de Padua in La Paz, Professor and Formator of the Diocesan Major Seminary Christ Buen Pastor, priest at the Cathedral, Parish Administrator of Santísima Trinidad parish in Puerto Salgar, parish priest of San Antonio de Padua parish in Manzanares. Begun in 2005 he was Diocesan Delegate for ordained ministers. Since 2010 he has taught at the Theological Pastoral Institute for Latin America (ITEPAL), serving as parish priest of Santísima Trinidad parish in Puerto Salgar since 2015.

On 7 May 2016, Pope Francis named him Bishop of San José del Guaviare. He received his episcopal consecration from Oscar Aníbal Salazar Gómez, Bishop of La Dorada-Guaduas, on 18 June and was installed on 9 July.

He was a participant in the Synod of Bishops for the Pan-Amazon region in 2019. He was one of four Synod prelates elected on 7 October to the thirteen-person committee to prepare the Synod's concluding document. (Note: Five other members are synod officials who serve ex offico and four are named by Pope Francis.)
