= St. James the Apostle Cathedral, Fontibón =

Coordinates: 4.6732°N 74.1440°W

St. James the Apostle Cathedral
- Catedral de Santiago Apóstol
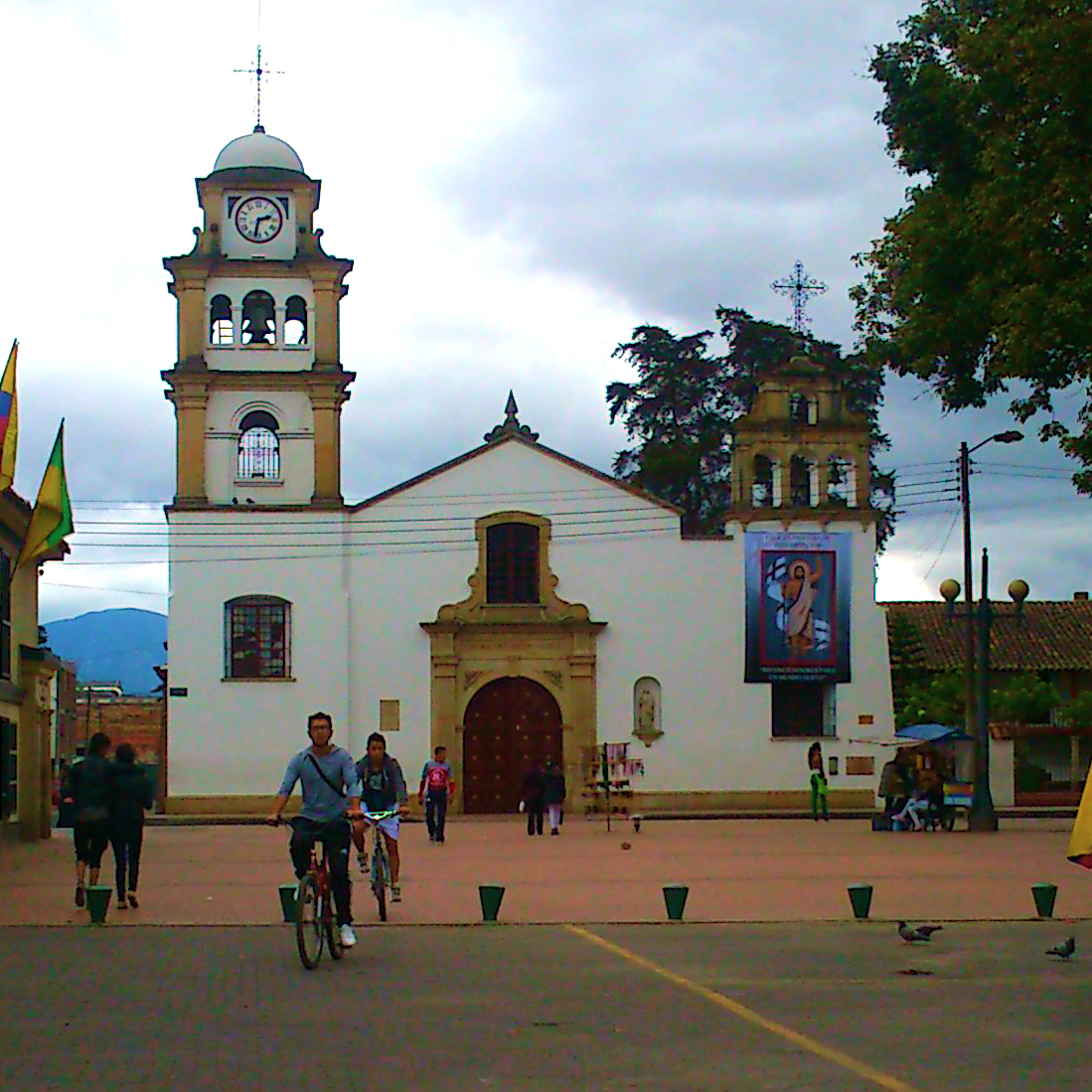
- St. James the Apostle Cathedral
- Location: Fontibón
- Country: Colombia
- Denomination: Roman Catholic Church

The St. James the Apostle Cathedral (Spanish: Catedral de Santiago Apóstol) Also Fontibón Cathedral Officially the Parish Cathedral of St. James the Apostle of Fontibón, is a cathedral church of Catholic worship consecrated under the patronage of the St. James the Apostle in Fontibón, in the South American country of Colombia. It is the Cathedral Church of the Diocese of Fontibón and, therefore, seat of the titular Bishop.

It is a Spanish Colonial style building located in the eastern corner of the main park of the town of Fontibón of Bogotá, in the 18th street with 99 street. The cathedral occupies the whole block together with the Casa Cural, the Episcopal Curia and the Parish School. The building is the highest structure in the area.

Was rebuilt between 1621 and 1632, being restored between 1945 and 1955.

== See also ==
- Roman Catholicism in Colombia
- St. James

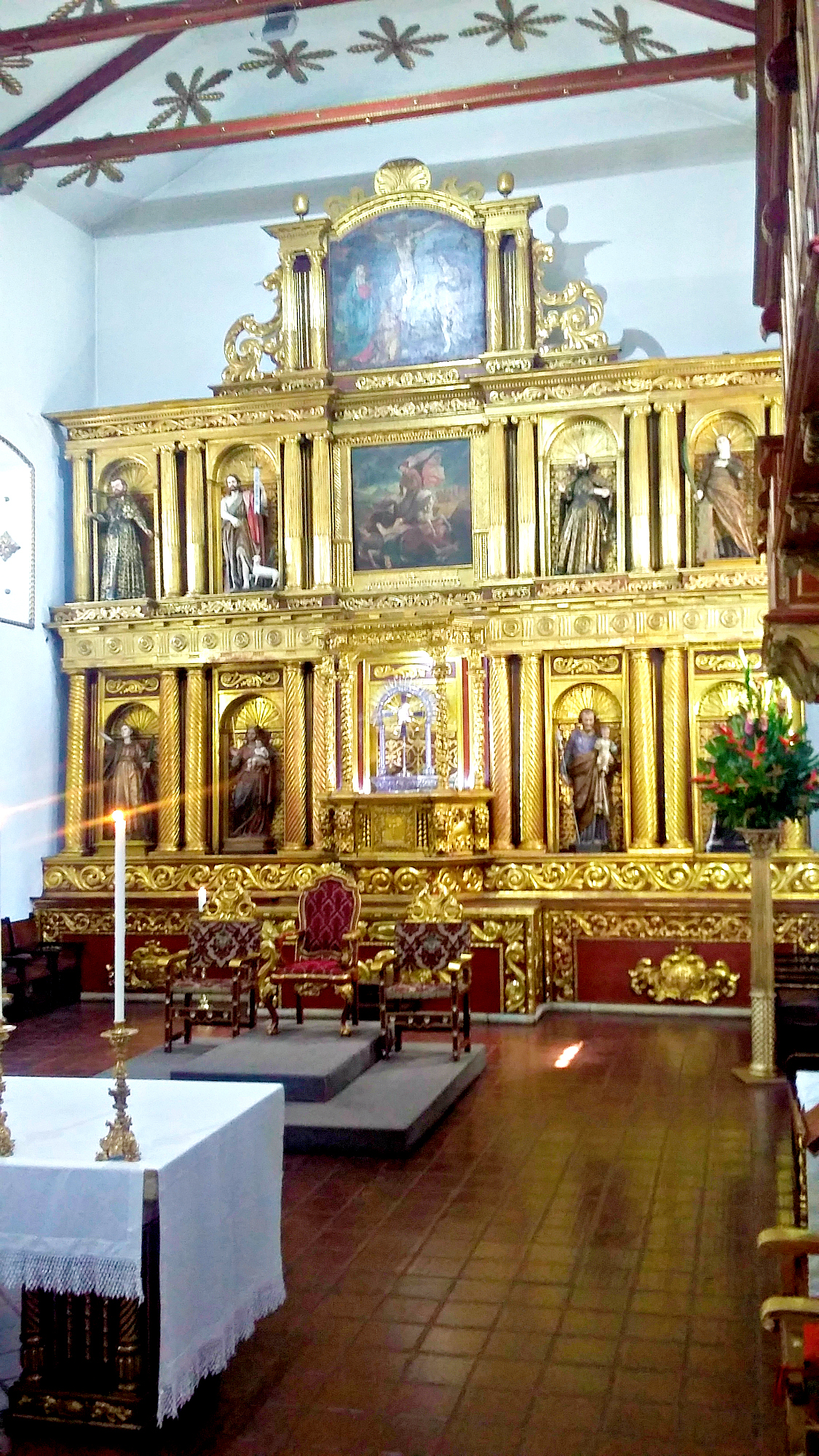
Internal View
