= José Ruiz Arenas =

Colombian prelate (born 1944)

Styles of José Ruiz Arenas
- Reference style: The Most Reverend
- Spoken style: Your Excellency
- Religious style: Monsignor
- Posthumous style: not applicable

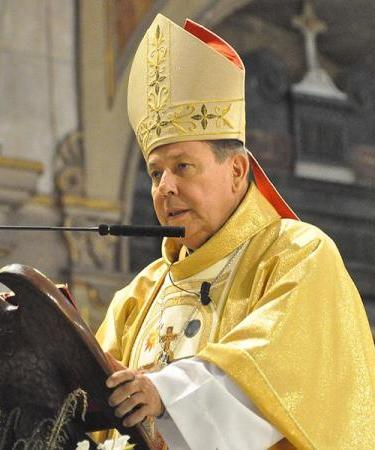

José Octavio Ruiz Arenas (born 21 December 1944) is a Colombian prelate of the Roman Catholic Church, who has served as secretary of the Pontifical Council for the Promotion of the New Evangelisation.

== Biography ==
José Ruiz Arenas was born in Bogotá, and ordained to the priesthood by Archbishop Aníbal Muñoz Duque on 29 November 1969.

He worked in the Congregation for the Doctrine of the Faith with the future Benedict XVI until 8 March 1996, when he was appointed auxiliary bishop of Bogotá and titular bishop of Troyna by Pope John Paul II. He received his episcopal consecration on the following 13 April from then-Archbishop Pedro Rubiano Sáenz, with Archbishops Paolo Romeo and Tarcisio Bertone, SDB, serving as co-consecrators. Ruiz Arenas was later named Bishop of Villavicencio on 16 July 2002, and was promoted to the rank of Archbishop when his see was elevated to an archdiocese on 3 July 2004.

On 31 May 2007, he entered the service of the Roman Curia upon his appointment as vice president of the Pontifical Commission for Latin America by Pope Benedict XVI.

On 13 May 2011 he was appointed the first secretary of Pontifical Council for the Promotion of the New Evangelisation by Pope Benedict.

On 5 March 2012 he was appointed a member of the Congregation for the Evangelization of Peoples by Pope Benedict.

On Tuesday, 18 September 2012, Archbishop Ruiz Arenas was named by Pope Benedict XVI to serve as one of the papally-appointed Synod Fathers of the upcoming October 2012 13th Ordinary General Assembly of the Synod of Bishops on the New Evangelization, presumably because of his position as Secretary of the Pontifical Council for the New Evangelization.

Preceded by Alfonso Cabezas Aristizábal	Archbishop of Villavicencio; 2002–2007	Succeeded by Oscar Urbina Ortega
Preceded by Luis Robles Díaz	Vice-President of the Pontifical Commission for Latin America; 2007–2011	Succeeded by Guzmán Carriquiry Lecour
