= Luis Concha Córdoba =

Colombian priest and Cardinal

His Eminence Luis Concha Córdoba
- Archbishop Emeritus of Bogotá
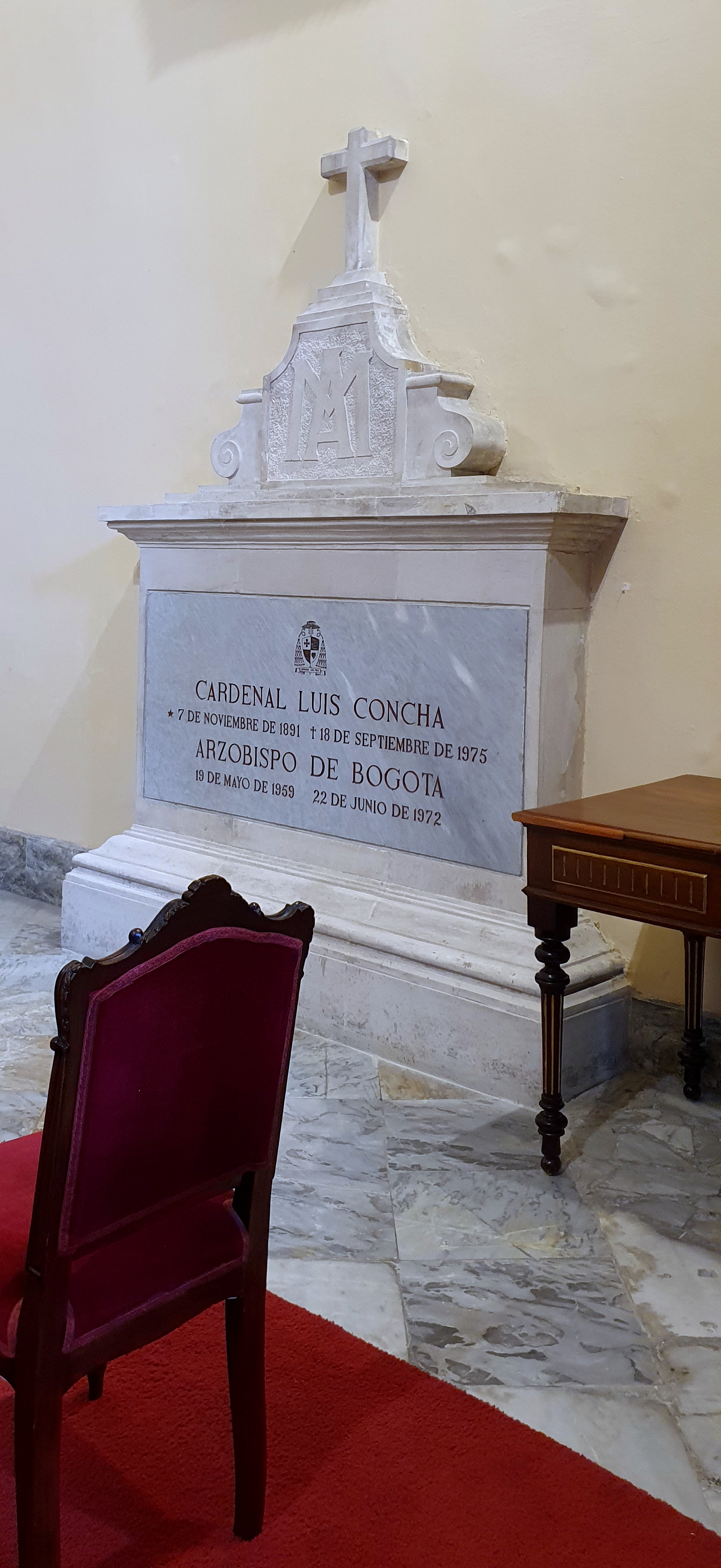
- Tomb at Primatial Cathedral of Bogotá
- Church: Roman Catholic Church
- Archdiocese: Bogotá
- Appointed: 18 May 1959
- Term ended: 29 July 1972
- Predecessor: Crisanto Luque Sánchez
- Successor: Aníbal Muñoz Duque
- Other post: Cardinal-Priest of Santa Maria Nuova (1961-75)
- Previous posts: Bishop of Manizales (1935-54); Archbishop of Manizales (1954-59); President of the Colombian Bishops' Conference (1959-66); Bishop of the Colombian Military (1959-72)

Orders
- Ordination: 28 October 1916 by Bernardo Herrera Restrepo
- Consecration: 30 November 1935 by Ismael Perdomo Borrero
- Created cardinal: 16 January 1961 by Pope John XXIII
- Rank: Cardinal-Prince

Personal details
- Born: Luis Concha Córdoba; 7 November 1891 Bogotá, Colombia
- Died: 18 September 1975 (aged 83) Bogotá, Colombia
- Buried: Primatial Cathedral of Bogotá
- Education: Pontifical Biblical Institute; Theological Seminary of Bogotá
- Motto: Mea lux Dominus
- Coat of arms: Luis Concha Córdoba's coat of arms

Styles of Luis Concha Córdoba
- Reference style: His Eminence
- Spoken style: Your Eminence
- Informal style: Cardinal

Luis Concha Córdoba (November 7, 1891—September 18, 1975) was a Colombian priest and Cardinal of the Roman Catholic Church.

Cardinal Concha served as Archbishop of Bogotá from 1959 to 1972, before his elevation to the cardinalate in 1961.

== Biography ==
Luis Concha Córdoba was born in Bogotá to José Vicente Concha, the future president of Colombia, and his first wife, Leonor Córdoba. His father prepared him for his first Communion. He was homeschooled in Latin by Dr Miguel Abadía Méndez, who was professor of the same subject at the Seminary of Bogotá, where Concha entered in 1908 to continue his studies in Latin. When Concha's father was made the Colombian ambassador to France, Luis went with him to Paris and there studied humanities. Upon his return to Bogotá, he continued his studies for the priesthood at the seminary.

Ordained on October 28, 1916, Concha then served as a chaplain to the cathedral school, and a professor at the seminary and Our Lady of the Rosary University in Bogotá until 1918, while also doing pastoral work. He was the director of the archdiocesan newspaper from November 1918 to March 1919, and later from August 16 to October 15, 1924. He further studied at the Pontifical Biblical Institute in Rome (where he studied Sacred Scripture), and the Seminary of Saint-Sulpice in Paris. In late 1920, he was forced by ill health to return early to Colombia without obtaining any academic degrees.

He was named a monastery chaplain, the prefect of studies and a professor at the seminary of Bogotá, and a professor of religion at Gimnasio Moderno and again at Our Lady of the Rosary University in 1921. Concha was raised to the rank of Privy Chamberlain Supernumerary on February 21 of that same year, and was later made spiritual director at the Bogotá seminary in 1923. President Pedro Nel Ospina offered him the position of rector of Our Lady of the Rosary University, but he declined. After teaching Sacred Scripture and moral theology at Bogotá's seminary, Concha became a prebendary of the cathedral chapter.

President of the committee for the 1925 Holy Year, he was also Sub-Promoter of the Faith in the informative process for the beatification of Ezequiel Moreno y Díaz, OAR, who was later canonized by Pope John Paul II on October 11, 1992. From 1933 to 1934, Concha served as a canon theologian of Bogotá's cathedral chapter and as secretary of the archdiocesan curia. He then worked as a general assistant to Catholic Action, and archdiocesan chancellor before becoming substitute to the Vicar General in 1934.

On July 13, 1935, Concha was appointed Bishop of Manizales by Pope Pius XI. He received his episcopal consecration on the following November 30 from Archbishop Ismael Perdomo, with Bishops Francisco Cristóbal Toro and Crisanto Luque Sánchez serving as co-consecrators, in the Cathedral of Bogotá. Concha became an Archbishop when his diocese was elevated to the rank of a metropolitan archdiocese on May 10, 1954.

Concha was later named Archbishop of Bogotá and thus Primate of the Church in Colombia on May 18, 1959. The next day, on May 19, he was made Vicar of the Catholic Military Ordinariate of Colombia. He also served as President of the Colombian Episcopal Conference.

Pope John XXIII made him Cardinal-Priest of S. Maria Nuova in the consistory of January 16, 1961. The Colombian primate attended the Second Vatican Council from 1962 to 1965, and was one of the cardinal electors who participated in the 1963 papal conclave that selected Pope Paul VI. Concha was staunchly conservative, and so Colombia was slow in implementing the reforms of the Council. He even prohibited any funeral Masses from being celebrated for Colombian priest and ELN guerilla Camilo Torres Restrepo. Concha resigned as Bogotá's archbishop on July 22, 1972, and military vicar of Colombia on the following July 29.

The Cardinal died after a long and painful illness at Clínica de Marly in Bogotá, aged 83, where he is buried in the cathedral.

Catholic Church titles
Preceded by Juan González Arbeláez	Archbishop of Manizales; 1935–1959	Succeeded by Arturo Duque Villegas
Preceded by Crisanto Luque Sánchez	Archbishop of Bogotá; 1959–1975	Succeeded by Aníbal Muñoz Duque
