= Teglata =

Africa Proconsularis (125 AD)

Tagarata, was a Roman era civitas of the Roman province of Africa Proconsularis. The ancient town has been tentatively identified with ruins either at Tell El-Caid, one of three tell at Aïn-Tlit or Henchir Kahloulta in the region of Carthage, Tunisia. The ancient town is known to history as the home of the Donatist Bishop Donato, who intervened at the Council of Carthage (411), it seems that time the town had no Catholic bishop. The bishopric exists today only as a titular see of the Roman Catholic Church.
