= Héctor Gutiérrez Pabón =

Colombian Roman Catholic prelate (1937–2024)

His Excellency Héctor Gutiérrez Pabón
- Bishop Emeritus of Engativá
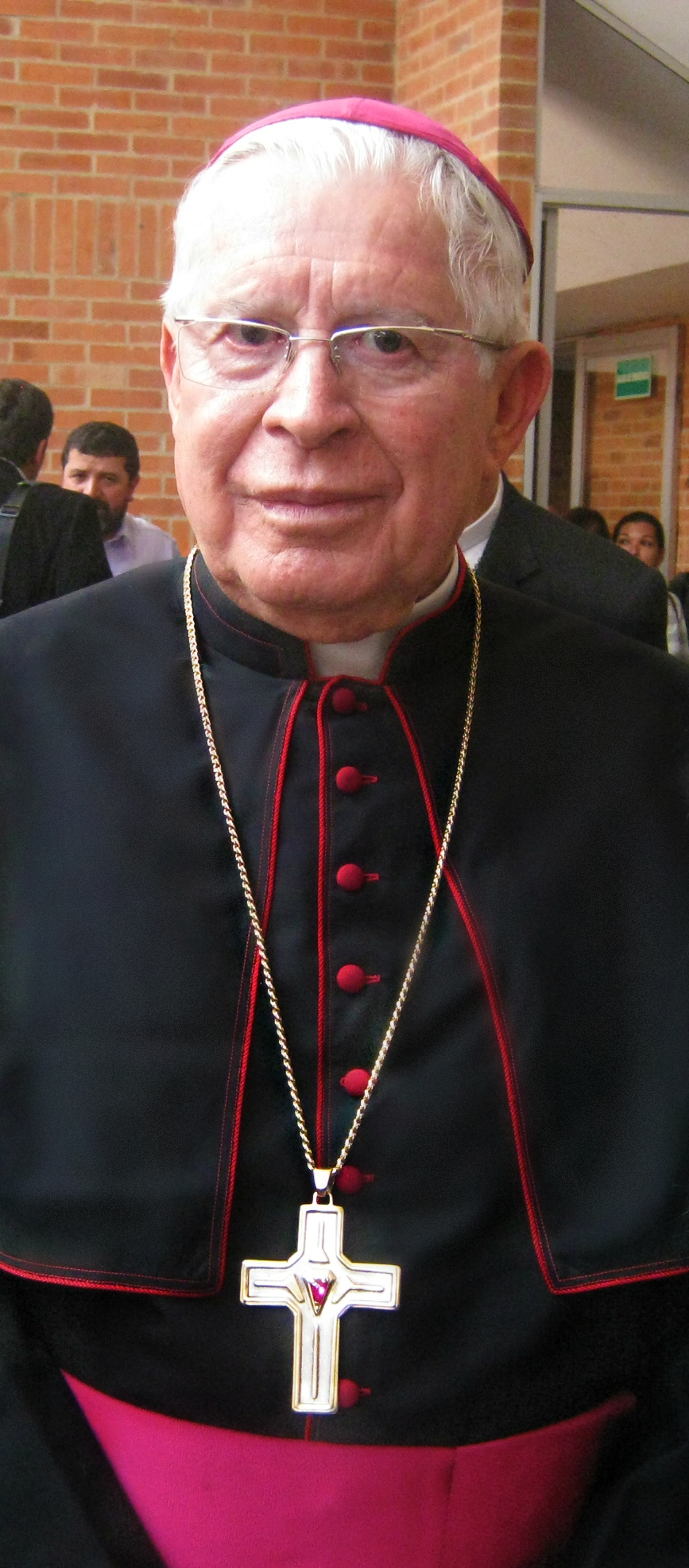
- Gutiérrez Pabón in 2012
- Archdiocese: Bogotá
- Diocese: Engativá
- Appointed: 6 August 2003
- Term ended: 26 June 2015
- Predecessor: First
- Successor: Francisco Antonio Nieto Súa
- Previous posts: Auxiliary Bishop of Cali and Titular Bishop of Segia (1987–1998); Bishop of Chiquinquirá (1998–2003)

Orders
- Ordination: 22 September 1962 by Emilio de Brigard Ortiz
- Consecration: 25 March 1987 by Angelo Acerbi

Personal details
- Born: 17 May 1937 Cáqueza, Colombia
- Died: 2 December 2024 (aged 87) Bogotá, Colombia
- Motto: Praedica Verbum Oportuna Et Inoportuna
- Coat of arms: Héctor Gutiérrez Pabón's coat of arms

Styles of Héctor Gutiérrez Pabón
- Reference style: His Excellency; The Most Reverend
- Spoken style: Your Excellency
- Religious style: Bishop

Héctor Luis Gutiérrez Pabón (17 May 1937 – 2 December 2024) was a Colombian prelate of the Roman Catholic Church. He was Auxiliary Bishop of Cali, Titular Bishop of Segia, Bishop of Chiquinquirá, Bishop of Engativá, and finally bishop emeritus of the latter. Gutierrez Pabón died in Bogotá on 2 December 2024, at the age of 87.

== See also ==
- Catholic Church in Colombia

Catholic Church titles
New title	Bishop of Engativá; 2003–2015	Succeeded by Francisco Antonio Nieto Súa
Preceded by Alvaro Raúl Jarro Tobos	Bishop of Chiquinquirá; 1998–2003	Succeeded by Luis Felipe Sánchez Aponte
Preceded by Edward Thomas Hughes	Titular Bishop of Segia; 1987–1998	Succeeded by Marcelo Arturo González Amador
Preceded by —	Auxiliary Bishop of Cali; 1987–1998	Succeeded by —
