= Pontifical Latin American College =

Coordinates: 41.8902°N 12.4346°E

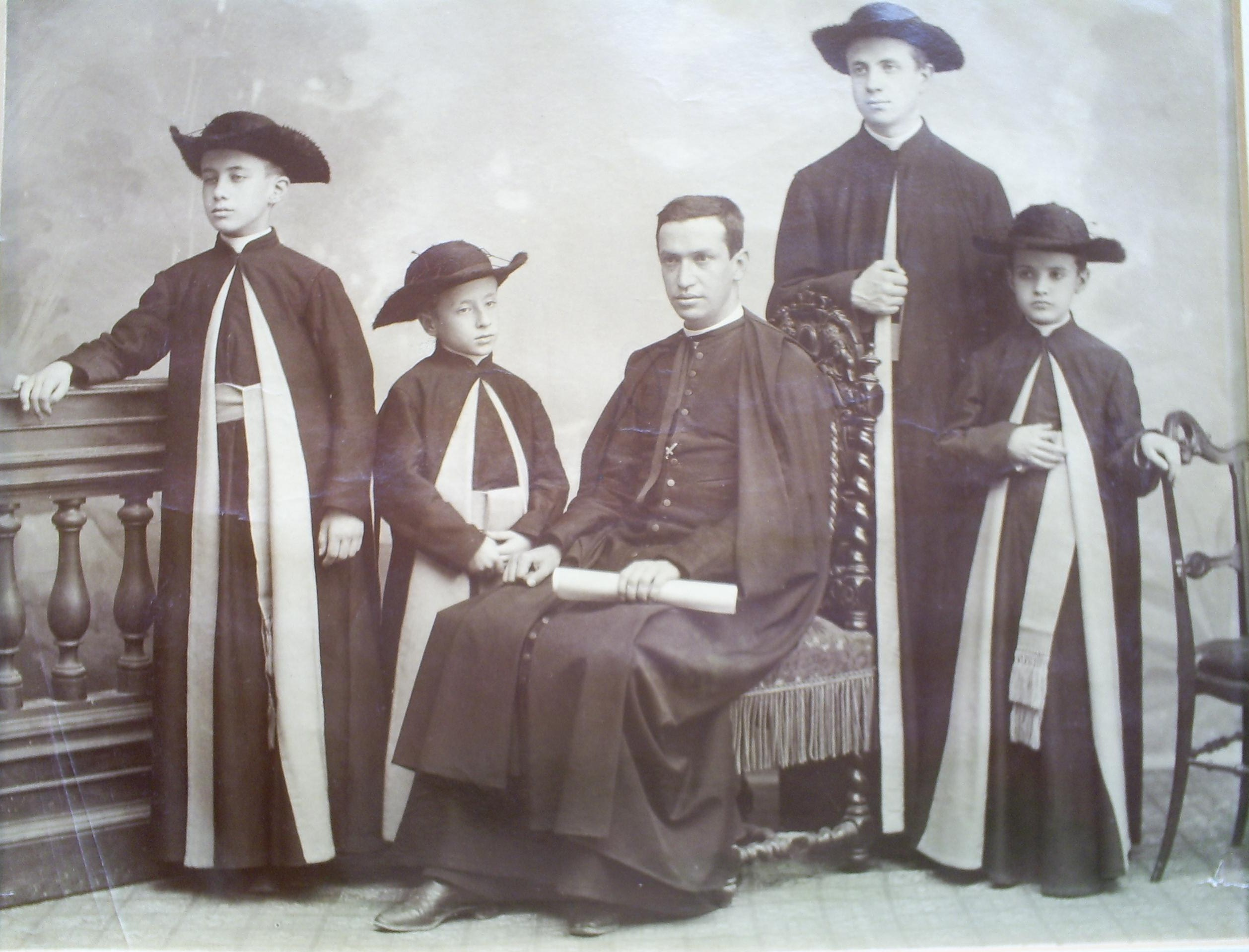
Students of the Pontifical Latin American College in 1888

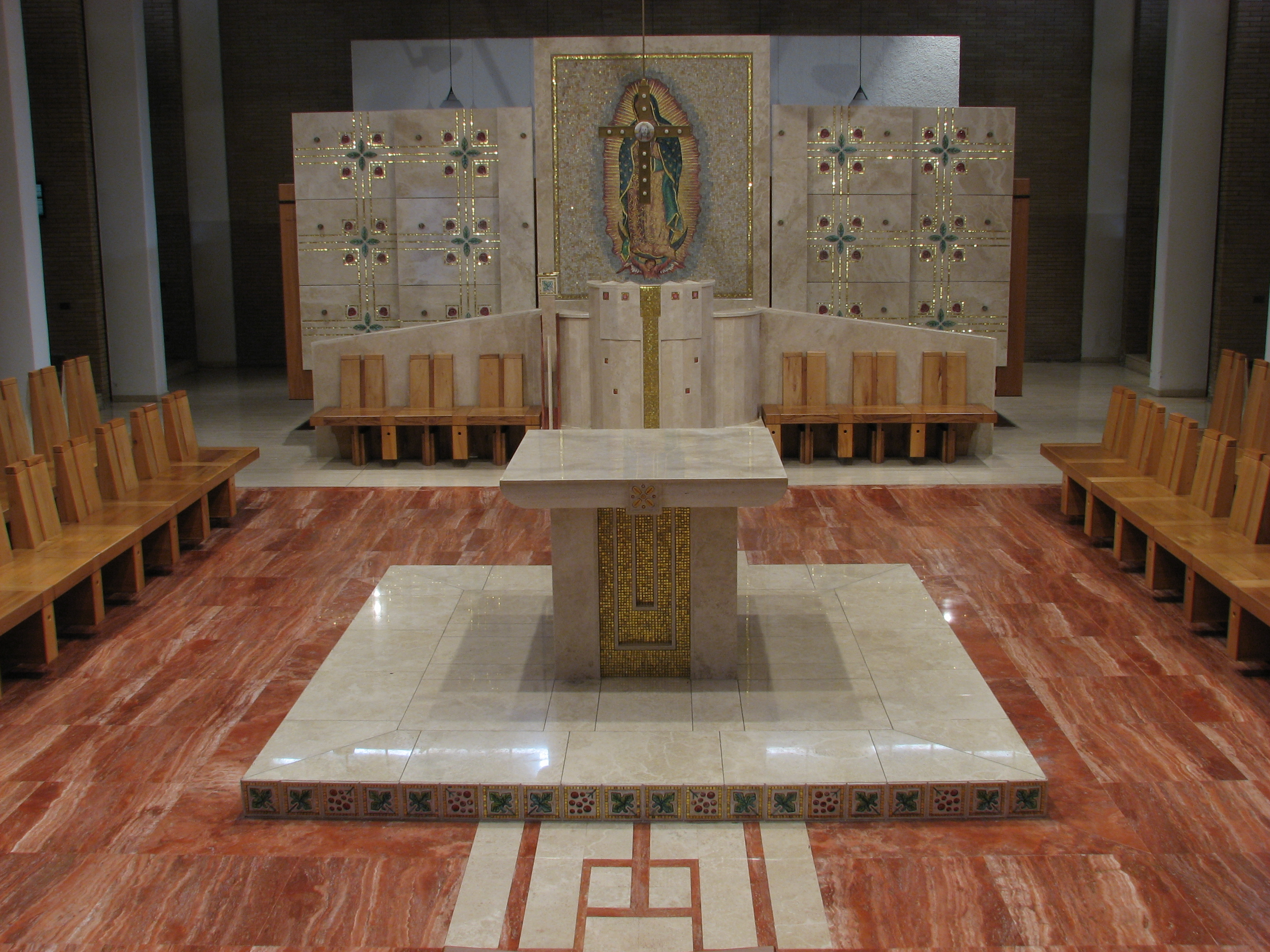
Chapel, interior

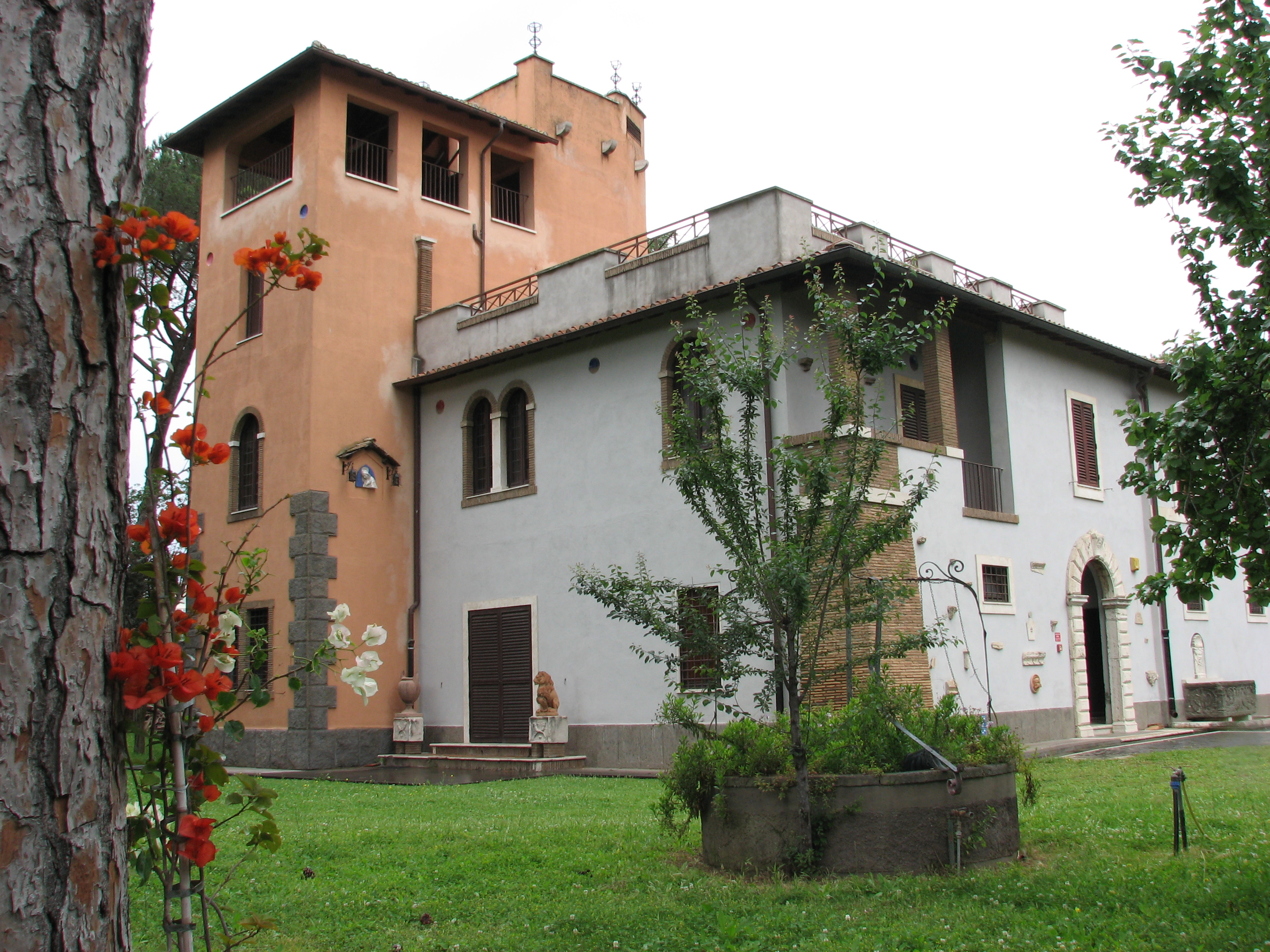
Library, exterior

The Pontifical Latin American College (Italian: Pontificio Collegio Pio Latino Americano, Spanish: Pontificio Colegio Pio Latino Americano) is one of the Roman Colleges of the Roman Catholic Church, for students from Central and South America. A pontifical college in Rome is a hostel for student priests who pursue higher ecclesiastical studies in various Church universities and institutes.

== History ==
In 1857, Ignacio Victor Eyzaguirre traveled to Rome from his home country of Chile, in order to propose to Pius IX the erection of a college for students from Latin American countries. Pius IX, who had been Apostolic Delegate in Chile, granted letters of approbation, and urged the bishops to send students and to help the foundation by procuring funds for the maintenance of the seminary.

Eyzaguirre went back to South America, collected some money, and returned to Rome with a few students. He rented a small house for these students and some others who arrived later. They were fifteen in all. Pius IX ordered the Fathers of the Society of Jesus to direct the new college, and they opened the college on 21 November 1858. In December 1859, Pius IX helped to purchase a larger house, belonging to the Dominican Order, near Santa Maria sopra Minerva. He also bought with his own money a villa and a vineyard for the use of the college, and made Eyzaguirre protonotary-apostolic. Towards the beginning of 1860, he sent this prelate back to South America as ablegate of the Holy See, to urge the bishops again to co-operate on a larger scale in procuring the necessary means for the support of the college. At the same time he himself contributed a large sum of money to the new house.

During 1864, Pius IX sent to the college books from his own private library, ordered a new chapel to be erected at his own expense, and furnished it with vestments and on 21 November, the 6th anniversary of its foundation, visited the college in person. He is considered the principal, if not the first, founder of the South American College.

The number of students continually increasing, the superiors had to look for another dwelling. Through the assistance of Carlo Sacconi, Cardinal-protector of the college, part of the old novitiate of the Jesuits, on the Quirinal—which since 1848 had been used for a French military hospital—was secured, the house near the Minerva sold, and the new residence occupied on 18 April 1867, the feast of the Patronage of St. Joseph, to whom the college had been dedicated.

South American bishops visiting Rome brought new students, and the number reached 59. Pius IX, almost unannounced, went to the new college, assisted at an "academy", and allowed his name to be added to its legal title, making it Collegio Pio-Latino Americano.

In 1870 the bishops attending the First Vatican Council increased the number of students to 82. In 1871, the Italian government having expelled the Jesuits from the small part of the novitiate they occupied, acceded to the request of the Brazilian Emperor and permitted the South American College to remain where it was until a suitable house should be found. The new rector, Agostino Santinelli, bought a new site in the Prati di Castello, not far from the Vatican, and near the Tiber. The foundation stone was blessed on 29 June 1884, by the protector, Cardinal Sacconi, in presence of a large assemblage, among whom was Peter Beckx, General of the Society of Jesus, then living in the American College. The work of building began immediately, and Santinelli saw the building finished in 1887–88.

It was here that the first General Council of Latin America (28 May – 9 July 1899) was held. There were present 53 prelates, archbishops and bishops, of whom 29 took up their quarters in the college, together with their secretaries and servants. The solemn opening took place in the college chapel, and all the sessions were held there. In the same chapel on 26 March 1905, the Cardinal Protector, Joseph C. Vives y Tuto, solemnly published the Apostolic Constitution Sedis Apostolicae providam, by which the pope granted the title of "Pontifical" to the college and committed its direction in perpetuum to the Society of Jesus. Aloysius Caterini, Provincial of the Roman Province, accepted the charge in the name of the General of the Society, absent through sickness.

A number of the seminaries and one ecclesiastical university in Latin America took their professors exclusively from the alumni of the college. Both the first cardinal of Latin America, Joaquin Arcoverde de Albuquerque-Cavalcanti, Archbishop of Rio de Janeiro, and the first cardinal of Chile, José María Caro, Archbishop of Santiago, studied there.

== See also ==
- List of Jesuit sites
