= Crisanto Luque Sánchez =

Colombian cardinal

His Eminence Crisanto Luque Sánchez
- Cardinal, Archbishop of Bogotá
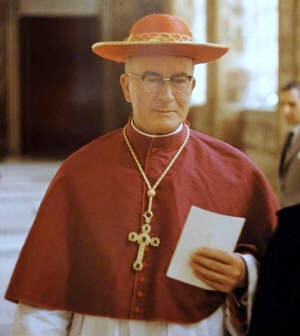
- The cardinal arrives to participate in the 1958 papal conclave.
- Church: Catholic Church
- Archdiocese: Bogotá
- Appointed: 14 July 1950
- Term ended: 7 May 1959
- Predecessor: Ismael Perdomo Borrero
- Successor: Luis Concha Córdoba
- Other posts: Military Vicar of Colombia (1950-59); Cardinal-Priest pro hac vice of Santi Cosma e Damiano (1953-59); President of the Colombian Episcopal Conference (1958-59)
- Previous posts: Titular Bishop of Croæ (1931-32); Auxiliary Bishop of Tunja (1931-32); Bishop of Tunja (1932-50)

Orders
- Ordination: 28 October 1916 by Bernardo Herrera Restrepo
- Consecration: 3 May 1931 by Paolo Giobbe
- Created cardinal: 12 January 1953 by Pius XII
- Rank: Cardinal-Priest

Personal details
- Born: Crisanto Luque Sánchez; 1 February 1889 Tenjo, Cundinamarca, Colombia
- Died: 7 May 1959 (aged 70) Bogotá, Colombia
- Buried: Bogotá Cathedral
- Parents: Heliodoro Luque; Natalia Sánchez
- Motto: Omnia et in Omnibus Christus
- Coat of arms

Styles of Crisanto Luque Sánchez
- Reference style: His Eminence
- Spoken style: Your Eminence
- Informal style: Cardinal
- See: Bogotá

Crisanto Luque Sánchez (February 1, 1889 – May 7, 1959) was a Colombian cardinal of the Roman Catholic Church. He served as Archbishop of Bogotá from 1950 to 1959, and was elevated to the cardinalate in 1953 by Pope Pius XII.

== Biography ==
Crisanto Luque Sánchez was born in Tenjo to Heliodoro Luque and Natalia Sáchez. After studying in Tabio, he attended the Major Seminary of Bogotá, alongside his future successor as archbishop of the same, Luis Concha Córdoba. Luque was ordained to the priesthood by Archbishop Bernardo Herrera Restrepo on October 28, 1916, and then did pastoral work in Bogotá until 1931. During that period, he served as a hospital chaplain, vicar, and pastor.

On January 16, 1931, Luque was appointed Auxiliary Bishop of Tunja and Titular Bishop of Croae. He received his episcopal consecration on the following May 3 from Archbishop Paolo Giobbe, with Bishops José Ignacio López Umana and Luis Adriano Díaz serving as co-consecrators, in the Cathedral of Bogotá. Luque served as vicar general and apostolic administrator before becoming Bishop of Tunja on September 9, 1932. He was later named Archbishop of Bogotá on July 14, 1950. On that same date, he was also made the first Apostolic Vicar of the Colombian Military Ordinariate.

Pope Pius XII created him Cardinal-Priest of Santi Cosma e Damiano in the consistory of January 12, 1953. Luque, the first Colombian cardinal, was papal legate to the third National Marian Congress in 1954, and attended the first general conference of the Latin American Episcopal Conference in 1955. In 1951, he formally asked the Ministry of Education to remove José Rodriguez's paintings, which contained nude subjects, from the National Museum. Luque also played a prominent role in the civil and political crisis that affected his country from 1949 to 1958, and participated in the 1958 papal conclave that selected Pope John XXIII.

An opponent of President Gustavo Rojas Pinilla, the Colombian primate condemned Rojas' "Third Force" political movement, and denounced an oath of loyalty he demanded from his political party in June 1957 as "illicit" and his party "dangerous". To the military junta that replaced Rojas, he also threatened to withdraw the Church's support if it did not turn over power in free elections. Luque warned his flock of incurring excommunication for sending their children to Protestant-run high schools, which were considered to be of high quality.

The cardinal died from a pulmonary hemorrhage in Bogotá, at age 70. He is buried in the metropolitan cathedral of that same city.

Catholic Church titles
Preceded by Eduardo Maldonado Calvo	Bishop of Tunja; 1932–1950	Succeeded by Angel Ocampo Berrio, SJ
Preceded by Ismael Perdomo Borrero	Archbishop of Bogotá; 1950–1959	Succeeded by Luis Concha Córdoba
Preceded by none	Apostolic Vicar of the Catholic Military Ordinariate of Colombia; 1950–1959	Succeeded by Luis Concha Córdoba
