= Diocese of Engativá =

Diocese of the Catholic Church in Colombia

Coordinates: 4°43′34″N 74°06′00″W

Diocese of Engativá Dioecesis Engativensis

Catholic

Location
- Country: Colombia
- Ecclesiastical province: Bogotá

Statistics
- Area: 133 km^{2} (51 sq mi)
- Population: Total; Catholics: (as of 2004); 1,332,728; 1,100,000 (82.5%)

Information
- Rite: Latin Rite
- Established: 6 August 2003 (23 years ago)
- Cathedral: St. John the Baptist Cathedral, Engativá

Current leadership
- Pope: Leo XIV
- Bishop: Germán Medina Acosta

Map

The Roman Catholic Diocese of Engativá (Latin: Engativensis) is a diocese located in the city of Engativá in the ecclesiastical province of Bogotá in Colombia.

== History ==
- 6 August 2003: Established as Diocese of Engativá from the Metropolitan Archdiocese of Bogotá

== Ordinaries ==
- Héctor Luis Gutiérrez Pabón (2003.08.06 – 2015.06.26)
- Francisco Antonio Nieto Súa (2015.06.26 – 2024.06.29)
- Germán Medina Acosta (since 2024.06.28)

== See also ==
- Roman Catholicism in Colombia
