= Military Ordinariate of Colombia =

Catholic ecclesiastical jurisdiction in Colombia

Military Ordinariate of Colombia Obispado Castrense de Colombia
- The Coat of Arms of the Military Ordinariate of Colombia

Location
- Country: Colombia
- Ecclesiastical province: Immediately exempt to the Holy See

Information
- Denomination: Catholic Church
- Sui iuris church: Latin Church
- Rite: Roman Rite
- Established: 13 October 1949 (76 years ago)

Current leadership
- Pope: Leo XIV
- Bishop: Sede vacante
- Apostolic Administrator: José Roberto Ospina Leongómez
- Bishops emeritus: Fabio Suescún Mutis

Website
- https://obispadocastrensecolombia.org/

The Military Bishopric of Colombia (Spanish: Obispado Castrense de Colombia) is a Latin Church military ordinariate of the Catholic Church. Immediately exempt to the Holy See, it provides pastoral care to Catholics serving in the Colombian Armed Forces and their families.

== History ==
It was first established as a military vicariate on 13 October 1949, with the first military vicar was appointed on 14 July 1950. It was elevated to a military ordinariate on 21 July 1986. The military ordinary's seat is located at the Military Cathedral of Jesus Christ Redeemer (Catedral Castrense Jesucristo Redentor) in the city of Bogotá.

== Office holders ==
=== Military vicars ===
- Crisanto Luque Sánchez (appointed 14 July 1950 – died 7 May 1959); elevated to Cardinal in 1953
- Luis Concha Córdoba (appointed 19 May 1959 – retired 29 July 1972); elevated to Cardinal in 1961
- Aníbal Muñoz Duque (appointed 30 July 1972 – retired 7 June 1985); elevated to Cardinal in 1973
- Mario Revollo Bravo (appointed 25 June 1984 – resigned 7 June 1985); future Cardinal (elevated in 1988)
- Víctor Manuel López Forero (appointed 7 June 1985 – became military ordinary 21 July 1986); see below

=== Military ordinaries ===
- Víctor Manuel López Forero (appointed 21 July 1986 – translated to the Archdiocese of Nueva Pamplona 21 June 1994); see above
- Alvaro Raúl Jarro Tobos (appointed 24 June 1997 – resigned 19 January 2001)
- Fabio Suescún Mutis (appointed 19 January 2001 – retired 7 December 2020)
- Víctor Manuel Ochoa Cadavid (incumbent, appointed 7 December 2020)

== See also ==
- Roman Catholicism in Colombia
