= SATENA Flight 8849 =

2026 aviation accident in Colombia

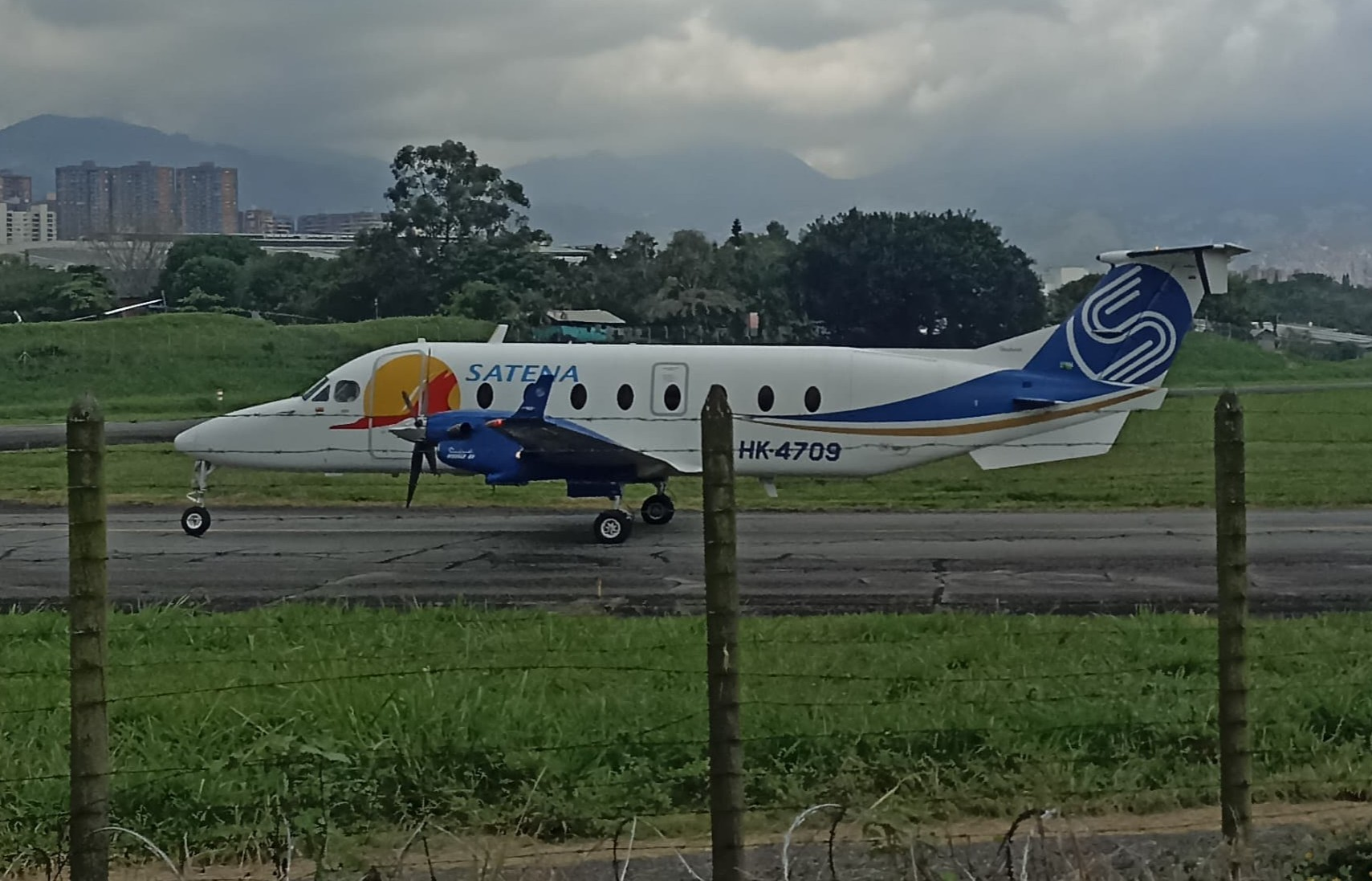
- HK-4709, the aircraft involved in the accident, pictured in 2025

Accident
- Date: 28 January 2026
- Summary: Crashed; under investigation
- Site: Curasica, Playa de Belén, Norte de Santander, Colombia; 8°12′20.7″N 73°11′54″W

Aircraft
- Aircraft type: Beechcraft 1900D
- Operator: SEARCA on behalf of SATENA
- IATA flight No.: 9R8849
- ICAO flight No.: NSE8849
- Call sign: SATENA 8849
- Registration: HK-4709
- Flight origin: Camilo Daza International Airport, Cúcuta, Norte de Santander, Colombia
- Destination: Aguas Claras Airport, Ocaña, Norte de Santander, Colombia
- Occupants: 15
- Passengers: 13
- Crew: 2
- Fatalities: 15
- Survivors: 0

On 28 January 2026, SATENA Flight 8849, a scheduled domestic flight in Colombia from Camilo Daza International Airport in Cúcuta to Aguas Claras Airport in Ocaña, crashed in Curasica, Playa de Belén, Norte de Santander. The Beechcraft 1900 operating the flight was carrying 13 passengers and two crew members. All 15 occupants were killed.

== Background ==
=== Aircraft ===
The aircraft involved in the accident was HK-4709, a Beechcraft 1900D manufactured in 1994 and operated by SEARCA for SATENA. The aircraft had 32,000 flight hours at the time of accident.

=== Passengers and crew ===
15 people were on board at the time of the accident, consisting of two crew members and 13 passengers. Among the passengers were Diógenes Quintero, a member of the Chamber of Representatives, and Carlos Salcedo, a candidate running in the March 2026 congressional election. The pilot had more than 10,000 hours of flying experience.

== Accident ==
The plane took off from Camilo Daza International Airport in Cúcuta at 16:42 UTC. The last contact was made at 16:54 UTC near the Venezuelan border. The wreckage was discovered in a rugged, densely covered area of the Cordillera Oriental known as Curasica in Playa de Belén. The plane was completely destroyed upon impact and no survivors were reported. The tail section and a chunk of fuselage remained intact.

== Investigation ==
The accident is being investigated by the Colombian Civil Aviation Authority. A preliminary report was released on 10 February.

== See also ==
- Buddha Air Flight 103
