= Diógenes Quintero =

Colombian politician (1989–2026)

Member of the Chamber of Representatives
- In office 13 March 2022 – 28 January 2026
- Constituency: Special Transitory Peace Constituency of Catatumbo, Norte de Santander

Personal details
- Born: Diógenes Quintero Amaya; 29 May 1989 Hacarí, Norte de Santander, Colombia
- Died: 28 January 2026 (aged 36) La Playa de Belén, Norte de Santander, Colombia
- Party: ASODES (Association of Displaced Families of Hacarí); Union Party for the People
- Education: Free University of Colombia; Universidad Externado de Colombia

Diógenes Quintero Amaya (Note: Spanish pronunciation: [diˈoxenes kinˈteɾo aˈmaʝa]. In this name that follows Hispanic American naming customs, the first or paternal surname is Quintero and the second or maternal family name is Amaya.) (29 May 1989 – 28 January 2026) was a Colombian lawyer, human rights defender and politician. He served in the Chamber of Representatives for the Special Transitory Peace Constituency of Catatumbo between 2022 and 2026, where he became one of the most representative figures of the peace seats created after the Peace Agreement. He was killed in a plane crash in Norte de Santander while campaigning for re-election to Congress.

== Early life and education ==
Quintero was born on 29 May 1989 in the village of Agua Blanca, in the municipality of Hacarí, in the Catatumbo region of Norte de Santander, an area historically affected by the armed conflict, forced displacement, and the absence of the state. His father was president of the local community action board for more than three decades, which influenced his early interest in social leadership and community participation.

He studied law at the Free University of Colombia, Cúcuta campus. He later obtained a specialization in administrative law and pursued a master's degree in management for development at the Universidad Externado de Colombia.

== Professional career ==
Quintero began his public career as a contractor for the Ombudsman's Office. Later, he served as the municipal ombudsman of Hacarí, a position from which he supported victims of the armed conflict and denounced human rights violations. During this period, he was the victim of threats and an attack on his home, which forced him to resign.

In 2019, Quintero was appointed regional ombudsman in Ocaña, one of the areas with the highest rates of violence in Norte de Santander. He founded and served as president of the Association of Ombudsmen of Catatumbo, an organization focused on the defense of human rights and institutional strengthening in the region.

== Political career ==
=== Chamber of Representatives ===
In the 2022 legislative elections, Quintero was elected to the Chamber of Representatives for the Special Transitory Peace Constituency of Catatumbo, (Note: Comprising the municipalities of Convención, El Carmen, El Tarra, Hacarí, San Calixto, Sardinata, Teorama and Tibú.) one of the 16 special seats created within the framework of the Peace Agreement for the regions most affected by the armed conflict. He obtained approximately 5,700 votes and was endorsed by organizations of victims of forced displacement.

During his legislative term, Quintero was a member of, among others, the First Permanent Constitutional Commission, the Third Permanent Constitutional Commission, and the Interparliamentary Commission on Public Credit. His work focused on the implementation of the Peace Agreement, comprehensive rural reform, victims' rights, and strengthening rural development in the Catatumbo region.

=== Controversy ===
Quintero's election was challenged by Ascamcat, a campesino association based in Catatumbo, which alleged that he was ineligible to serve, that there had been irregularities in the vote count, and that the mayor of Hacarí had shown favouritism towards his candidacy. The Council of State, however, dismissed the claims and upheld his election to the Chamber.

=== Re-election ===
On 5 December 2025, Quintero registered to seek re-election in the March 2026 legislative election.

== Death and legacy ==
On 28 January 2026, Quintero died in a plane crash in the rural area of the municipality of La Playa de Belén, Norte de Santander, while traveling on a regional flight operated by the airline SATENA from Cúcuta to Ocaña; his assistant, Natalia Acosta, and other members of his team were also on the flight.

He is remembered as one of the leading voices of the Catatumbo region in the Congress of the Republic and as a representative of the communities victimized by the armed conflict, standing out for his commitment to peace, human rights, and rural development.
