= Cathedral of Our Lady of the Rosary of El Palmar =

Coordinates: 3°31′37″N 76°18′02″W

Cathedral of Our Lady of the Rosary of Palmar
- Catedral de Nuestra Señora del Rosario del Palmar
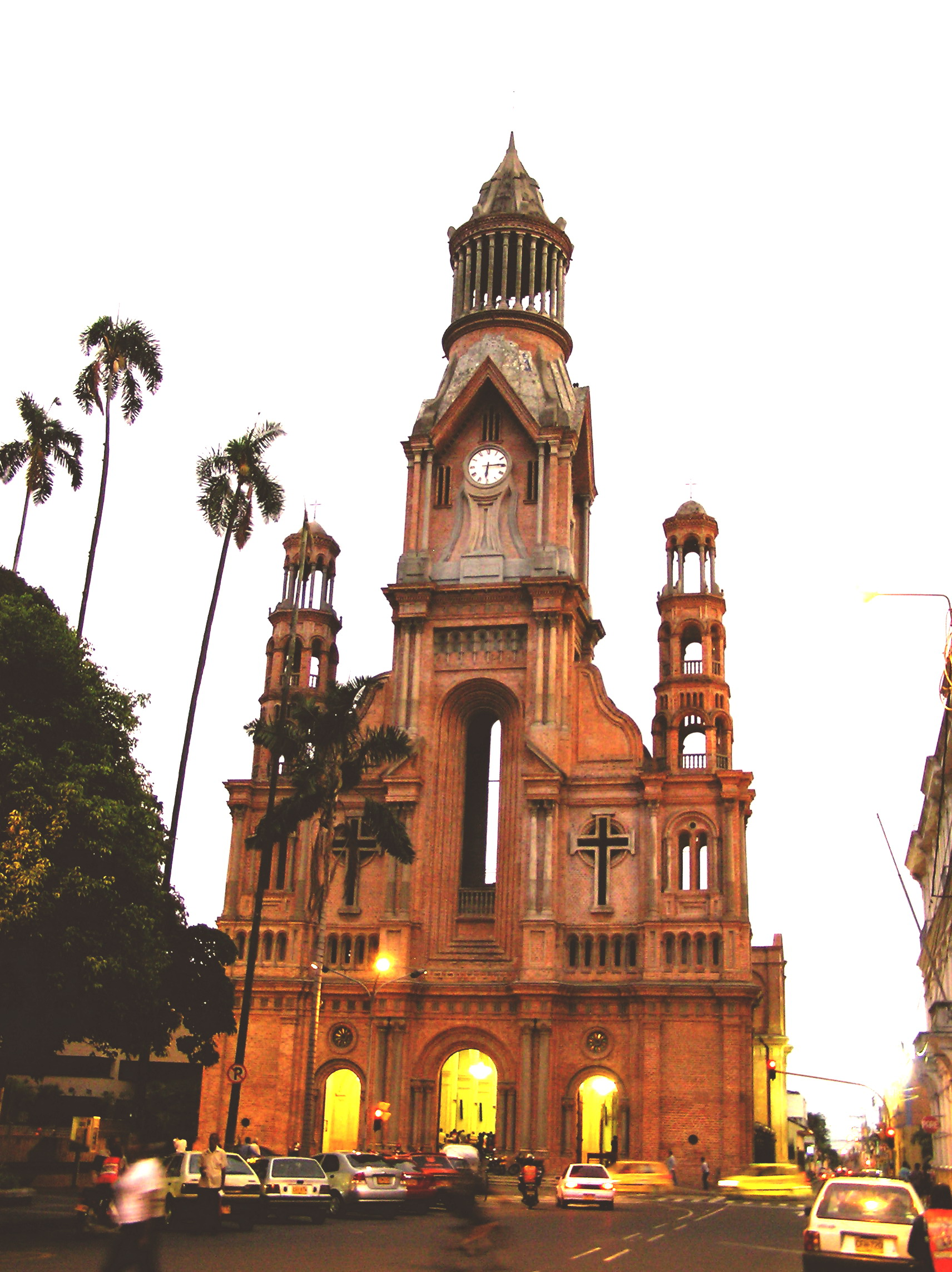
- Façade of the cathedral
- Cathedral of Our Lady of the Rosary of Palmar
- Location: Palmira, Valle del Cauca, Colombia
- Address: Calle 30 No. 29-79
- Country: Colombia
- Denomination: Catholic Church
- Website: diocesispalmira.org/catedral

History
- Status: Cathedral
- Dedication: Our Lady of the Rosary

Architecture
- Functional status: Active

Administration
- Diocese: Roman Catholic Diocese of Palmira

The Cathedral of Our Lady of the Rosary of Palmar is a Catholic cathedral located in Palmira, Valle del Cauca, Colombia. It is the cathedral church of the Roman Catholic Diocese of Palmira and the seat of the Bishop of Palmira.

The church is dedicated to Our Lady of the Rosary under the local title of Nuestra Señora del Rosario del Palmar. It is located at Calle 30 No. 29-79, in the urban centre of Palmira, and functions as an active cathedral parish of the diocese.

== History ==
The history of the church is linked to the former parish of Nuestra Señora del Rosario del Palmar, which formed part of the religious development of Palmira during the colonial period. According to the Diocese of Palmira, the parish was created on 12 September 1722, although the original decree has not been preserved. The same source states that the parish was formally recognized by Decree No. 1610 of 28 May 2012.

The dedication to Nuestra Señora del Rosario del Palmar has been historically associated with the religious life of Palmira. The municipal government of Palmira has linked the image and devotion of Our Lady of the Rosary of Palmar with the religious identity and historical memory of the city.

In 2022, the municipal government commemorated the 300th anniversary of the cathedral, describing it as part of the architectural, religious and cultural heritage of Palmira. The local administration also emphasized the historical and symbolic value of the image of Nuestra Señora del Rosario del Palmar for the municipality.

== Diocesan cathedral ==
The church became the cathedral of the Diocese of Palmira after the diocese was erected on 17 December 1952 by Pope Pius XII through the papal bull Romanorum partes. Since then, it has served as the principal church of the diocese and houses the cathedra of the Bishop of Palmira.

The Diocese of Palmira is a Latin Church ecclesiastical jurisdiction, suffragan to the Roman Catholic Archdiocese of Cali. Its territory comprises several municipalities in Valle del Cauca Department.

As the cathedral church, it is used for diocesan liturgical celebrations, including ceremonies presided over by the Bishop of Palmira.

== Location ==
The cathedral is located in the centre of Palmira, at Calle 30 No. 29-79. Its central location and religious function have made it one of the most recognizable Catholic churches in the municipality.

The cathedral has also been included in local initiatives related to religious tourism, cultural heritage and historical memory in Palmira.

== Architecture and heritage ==
The Cathedral of Our Lady of the Rosary of Palmar has been described by the municipal government of Palmira as part of the architectural, religious and cultural heritage of the municipality.

The building is notable for its role within the traditional urban landscape of Palmira. However, available sources do not establish with certainty a single architectural style or the exact construction date of the present building. For that reason, the date of 1722 should be understood as referring to the historical parish rather than necessarily to the completion of the current structure.

The cathedral has also been included in local cultural and heritage initiatives. In 2026, the municipal government of Palmira highlighted the cathedral, the parish church of the Holy Trinity and the church of Los Carmelos as symbolic religious heritage sites of the city.

== Dedication ==
The cathedral is dedicated to Nuestra Señora del Rosario del Palmar, a local Marian title associated with the religious tradition of Palmira. The dedication is related to the Catholic devotion to Our Lady of the Rosary and to the historical identity of the city.

The image of Nuestra Señora del Rosario del Palmar has been highlighted by the municipal government as an element of religious and historical value for Palmira, linked to the collective memory of generations of local residents.

== Religious life ==
The cathedral functions as an active parish of the Diocese of Palmira. According to the diocese, the Cathedral Parish of Nuestra Señora del Rosario del Palmar has a parish office and holds Eucharistic celebrations on weekdays, Saturdays, Sundays and holidays.

The church is used for ordinary parish celebrations and diocesan ceremonies. Because of its status as cathedral church, it also hosts liturgical events associated with the Bishop of Palmira and the pastoral life of the diocese.

== Relationship with the Diocese of Palmira ==
The Cathedral of Our Lady of the Rosary of Palmar is the principal church of the Roman Catholic Diocese of Palmira. The cathedral is part of the Vicariate of Our Lady of the Rosary of Palmar, which includes several parishes in Palmira and nearby rural districts.

Since 31 May 2024, the Bishop of Palmira has been Rodrigo Gallego Trujillo, appointed by Pope Francis. The Colombian Episcopal Conference states that he received episcopal ordination on 10 August 2024 and took canonical possession of the diocese on 17 August of the same year.

== Cultural importance ==
In addition to its religious role, the cathedral occupies an important place in the cultural memory of Palmira. The municipal government has presented it as part of the city's religious and heritage experience, especially in the context of Holy Week and local cultural activities.

The cathedral has also been highlighted in local cultural programmes for its role as a religious and symbolic site of the municipality.

== See also ==
- Roman Catholic Diocese of Palmira
- Palmira, Valle del Cauca
- Our Lady of the Rosary
- Catholic Church in Colombia
- Roman Catholic Archdiocese of Cali
