= Diocese of Ocaña =

Diocese of the Catholic Church in Colombia

Diocese of Ocaña Dioecesis Ocaniensis

Catholic

Location
- Country: Colombia
- Ecclesiastical province: Nueva Pamplona

Statistics
- Area: 18,000 km^{2} (6,900 sq mi)
- Population: Total; Catholics: (as of 2004); 417,514; 352,137 (84.3%)

Information
- Rite: Roman Rite
- Established: 26 October 1962 (63 years ago)
- Cathedral: St. Anne's Cathedral, Ocaña

Current leadership
- Pope: Leo XIV
- Bishop: Orlando Olave Villanoba
- Bishops emeritus: Jorge Enrique Lozano Zafra

Map

The Roman Catholic Diocese of Ocaña (Latin: Ocaniensis) is a diocese located in the city of Ocaña in the ecclesiastical province of Nueva Pamplona in Colombia.

The diocese was created on 26 October 1962 by Pope John XXIII, covering the departments of Norte de Santander and Cesar. It covers 18,000 km^{2}, and includes 18 towns and two townships in the municipality of La Esperanza (whose head belongs to the Nueva Pamplona).

== History ==
- 26 October 1962: Established as Diocese of Ocaña from the Diocese of Santa Marta

== Ordinaries ==
- Rafael Sarmiento Peralta † (26 Oct 1962 – 24 Jul 1972) Appointed, Bishop of Neiva
- Ignacio José Gómez Aristizábal (24 Jul 1972 – 10 Oct 1992) Appointed, Archbishop of Santa Fe de Antioquia
- Jorge Enrique Lozano Zafra (28 Jun 1993 – 15 May 2014) Retired
- Gabriel Ángel Villa Vahos (15 May 2014 – 11 Feb 2020) Appointed, Archbishop of Tunja
- Luis Gabriel Ramírez Díaz (27 February 2021 – 8 January 2023)
- Orlando Olave Villanoba (11 July 2024 – Present)

== See also ==
- Roman Catholicism in Colombia
