= Quinter (surname) =

Quinter is a surname. Notable people with the surname include:

- Bill Quinter (1939–2014), American and Canadian football player, coach, and executive
- Neil F. Quinter (born 1962), American politician

== See also ==
- Quintero (surname)
