= Ignacio Gómez (disambiguation) =

Ignacio Gómez ("Nacho Gómez", born c. 1962) is a Colombian journalist.

Ignacio Gómez may also refer to:

- Ignacio Gómez Aristizábal (1929–2026), Colombian prelate of the Roman Catholic Church
- Ignacio Gómez Jaramillo (1910–1970), Colombian painter and muralist
- Ignacio Gómez Novo ("Nacho Novo", born 1979), Spanish footballer and team manager
