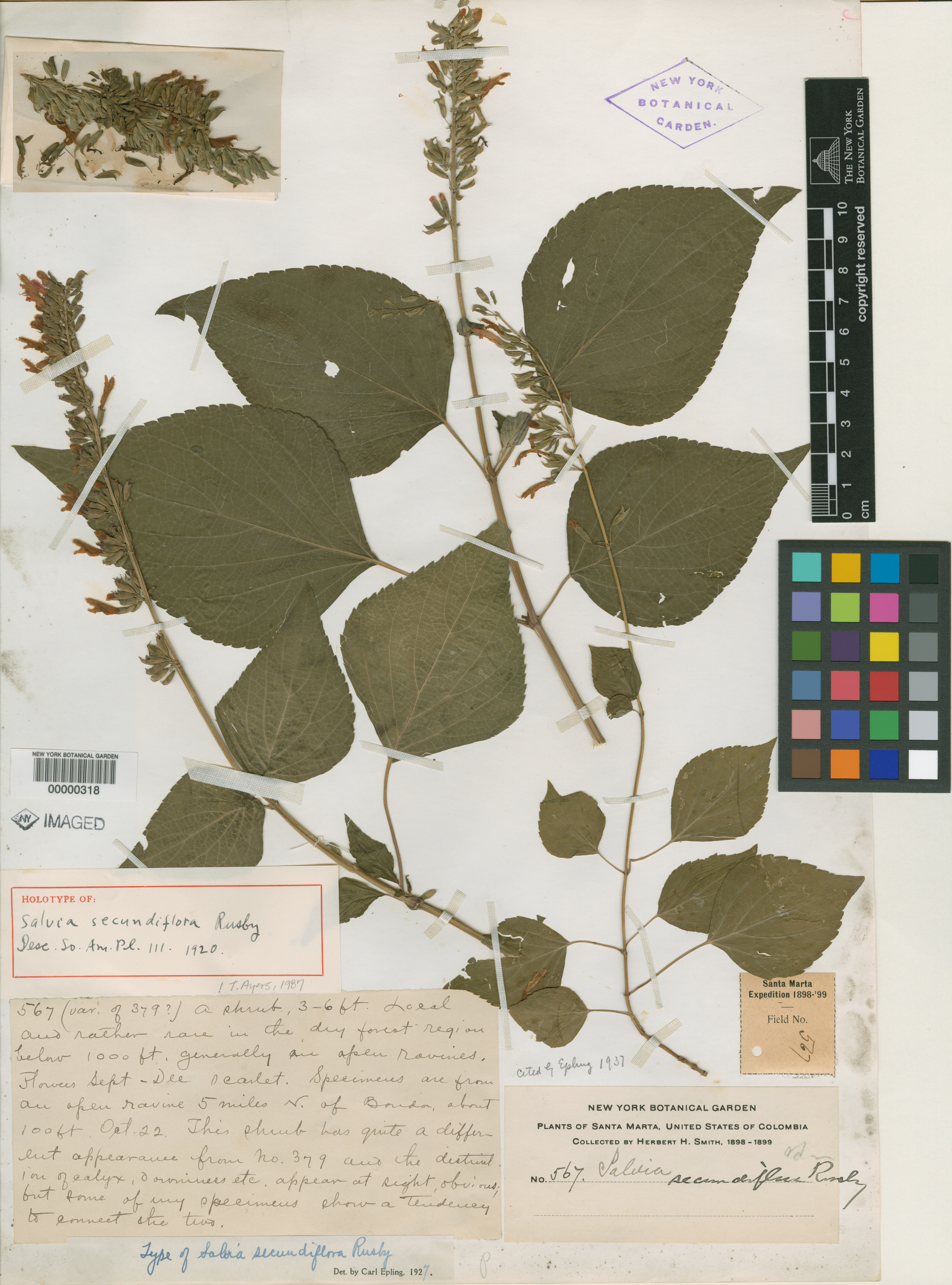

Scientific classification
- Kingdom: Plantae
- Clade: Tracheophytes
- Clade: Angiosperms
- Clade: Eudicots
- Clade: Asterids
- Order: Lamiales
- Family: Lamiaceae
- Genus: Salvia
- Species: S. camarifolia

Binomial name
- Salvia camarifolia Benth.

= Salvia camarifolia =

Species of shrub

Salvia camarifolia is a perennial undershrub native to the northern and eastern slopes of the Sierra Nevada de Santa Marta in Colombia, growing at elevations from 0 to 1,600 m (0 to 5,249 ft). There is also past evidence of a specimen from the Ocaña region. S. camarifolia grows 1 to 3 metres (3.3 to 9.8 ft) tall, with ovate grey-green leaves that are 6 to 12 cm (2.4 to 4.7 in) long and 3 to 6 centimetres (1.2 to 2.4 in) wide. The red corolla is 1.5 to 2 centimetres (0.59 to 0.79 in) long, with subequal lips that are 4 to 5 centimetres (1.6 to 2.0 in).
