= Quintero (disambiguation) =

Quintero is a town in Chile.

Quintero may also refer to:

- Quintero (surname), a surname (including a list of people with the name)
- Quintero (cigar brand)
