= Luis Adriano Piedrahita Sandoval =

Colombian catholic priest (1946–2021)

The Most Reverend Luis Adriano Piedrahíta Sandoval
- Bishop of Santa Marta
- Church: Catholic Church
- Diocese: Diocese of Santa Marta
- In office: 5 August 2014 – 11 January 2021
- Predecessor: Ugo Puccini Banfi
- Successor: José Mario Bacci Trespalacios
- Previous posts: Bishop of Apartadó (2007-2014); Titular Bishop of Centenaria (1999-2007); Auxiliary Bishop of Cali (1999-2007)

Orders
- Ordination: 29 October 1972
- Consecration: 8 September 1999 by Isaías Duarte Cancino

Personal details
- Born: 7 October 1946 Palmira, Valle del Cauca Department, Colombia
- Died: 11 January 2021 (aged 74) Santa Marta, Magdalena Department, Colombia

Luis Adriano Piedrahíta Sandoval (7 October 1946 – 11 January 2021) was a Colombian Catholic bishop.

== Life ==
Piedrahíta Sandoval was born in 1946 and was ordained to the priesthood in 1972. He served as titular bishop of Centenarian and as auxiliary bishop of the Roman Catholic Archdiocese of Cali, Colombia, from 1999 to 2007. He then served as bishop of the Roman Catholic Diocese of Apartadó, Colombia, from 2007 to 2014 and as bishop of the Roman Catholic Diocese of Santa Marta, Colombia from 2014 until his death in 2021.

He died on 11 January 2021, from COVID-19 during the COVID-19 pandemic in Colombia, having been diagnosed on 20 December 2020.
