= Diocese of Apartadó =

Diocese of the Catholic Church in Colombia

Coordinates: 7°53′N 76°38′W

Diocese of Apartadó Dioecesis Apartadoënsis Diócesis de Apartadó

Catholic

Location
- Country: Colombia
- Metropolitan: Archdiocese of Santa Fe de Antioquia
- Headquarters: Apartadó, Antioquia Department, Colombia

Statistics
- Area: 26,000 km^{2} (10,000 sq mi)
- Population: Total; Catholics: (as of 2023); 675,000; 503,000 (74.5%)
- Parishes: 43

Information
- Denomination: Catholic Church
- Sui iuris church: Latin Church
- Rite: Roman Rite
- Established: 18 June 1988; 38 years ago
- Cathedral: Cathedral of St. Mary
- Secular priests: 58 (55 Diocesan, 3 Religious Orders)

Current leadership
- Pope: Leo XIV
- Bishop: Carlos Correa Martínez
- Metropolitan Archbishop: Hugo Torres Marín

Map

The Roman Catholic Diocese of Apartadó (Latin: Apartadoënsis) is a diocese located in the city of Apartadó in the ecclesiastical province of Santa Fe de Antioquia in Colombia.

== History ==
On 18 June 1988, the Diocese of Apartadó was established from the Diocese of Antioquía.

In 2018, the Diocese, along with other dioceses, condemned continuing violence from armed groups in Colombia. As of 2023, Missionary nuns are assisting migrants displaced by the violence.

== Leadership ==
=== Bishops of Apartadó ===
- Isaías Duarte Cancino (18 June 1988 – 19 August 1995), appointed Archbishop of Cali
- Tulio Duque Gutiérrez, S.D.S. (18 March 1997 – 25 July 2001), appointed Bishop of Pereira
- Germán García Isaza, C.M. (1 March 2002 – 11 October 2006)
- Luis Adriano Piedrahita Sandoval (3 July 2007 – 5 August 2014), appointed Bishop of Santa Marta
- Hugo Torres Marín (29 September 2015 – 25 January 2023), appointed Archbishop of Santa Fe de Antioquia
- Carlos Correa Martínez (19 March 2024 – Present)

== See also ==
- Roman Catholicism in Colombia
