= Arnulfo Moreno Quiñonez =

Colombian Roman Catholic bishop (born 1979)

His Excellency, The Most Reverend Arnulfo Moreno Quiñonez
- Auxiliary Bishop of Cali
- Church: Roman Catholic Church
- Archdiocese: Cali
- Appointed: 25 May 2026
- Other post: Titular Bishop of Castra Nova (since 2026)
- Previous post: Pro-Vicar Apostolic of Apostolic Vicariate of Guapi (2024–2025)

Orders
- Ordination: 17 July 2010
- Consecration: 25 July 2026 by Luis Fernando Rodríguez Velásquez

Personal details
- Born: 25 March 1979 (age 47) El Charco, Nariño, Colombia
- Education: Major Seminary of San Pedro Apóstol, Cali
- Coat of arms

Arnulfo Moreno Quiñonez (Note: In this name that follows Hispanic American naming customs, the first or paternal surname is Moreno and the second or maternal family name is Quiñonez.) (born 25 March 1979) is a Colombian Roman Catholic prelate who has served as auxiliary bishop of the Archdiocese of Cali and titular bishop of Castra Nova since 2026. A priest of the Apostolic Vicariate of Guapi since 2010, he previously served as pro-vicar apostolic of Guapi during the sede vacante from 2024 to 2025.

== Early life and education ==
Moreno Quiñonez was born on 25 March 1979 in El Charco, Nariño, Colombia. He completed his philosophical and theological formation at the Major Seminary of San Pedro Apóstol in Cali before being ordained to the priesthood for the Apostolic Vicariate of Guapi on 17 July 2010.

== Priestly ministry ==
Following his ordination, Moreno Quiñonez served in a variety of pastoral and administrative assignments within the Apostolic Vicariate of Guapi, including:

- Parochial vicar of the Cathedral of La Inmaculada Concepción, Guapi (2010)
- Pastor of San Antonio de Padua Parish, Guapi (2011–2014)
- Territorial coordinator of teachers in Guapi (2011–2012)
- Parish administrator of La Santísima Trinidad, López de Micay (2015)
- Parish administrator of Nuestra Señora de los Ángeles, Chelva, Valencia, Spain (2015–2017)
- Pastor of Nuestra Señora del Rosario, Santa María de Timbiquí (2017)
- Delegate for family ministry of the Apostolic Vicariate of Guapi (from 2019)
- Pastor of the Cathedral of La Inmaculada Concepción, Guapi (2021–2025)
- Delegate vicar of the Apostolic Vicariate of Guapi (2021–2024; again from 2025 until 2026)
- Pro-vicar apostolic of Guapi (2024–2025).

During the vacancy of the Apostolic Vicariate of Guapi following the transfer of Bishop Carlos Alberto Correa Martínez, Moreno Quiñonez was appointed pro-vicar apostolic on 11 May 2024 by the Apostolic Nunciature to Colombia to oversee the territory until the appointment of a new apostolic vicar.

In November 2024, while he was administering the vicariate, the episcopal residence and offices in Guapi were damaged by an explosive device in an attack attributed to armed groups operating in the region.

== Episcopal ministry ==
On 25 May 2026, Pope Leo XIV appointed Moreno Quiñonez auxiliary bishop of Cali and titular bishop of Castra Nova. The appointment was announced simultaneously by the Holy See and the Episcopal Conference of Colombia. He received episcopal consecration on 25 July 2026. The principal consecrator was Archbishop Luis Fernando Rodríguez Velásquez.
