= Diocese of Palmira =

Diocese of the Catholic Church in Colombia

Diocese of Palmira Dioecesis Palmiranus

Catholic

Location
- Country: Colombia
- Metropolitan: Cali

Statistics
- Area: 3,000 km^{2} (1,200 sq mi)
- Population: Total; Catholics: (as of 2004); 700,000; 600,000 (85.7%)

Information
- Rite: Latin Rite
- Established: 17 December 1952 (73 years ago)
- Cathedral: Catedral de Nuestra Señora del Rosario del Palmar

Current leadership
- Pope: Leo XIV
- Bishop: Rodrigo Gallego Trujillo
- Metropolitan Archbishop: Darío de Jesús Monsalve Mejía

Map

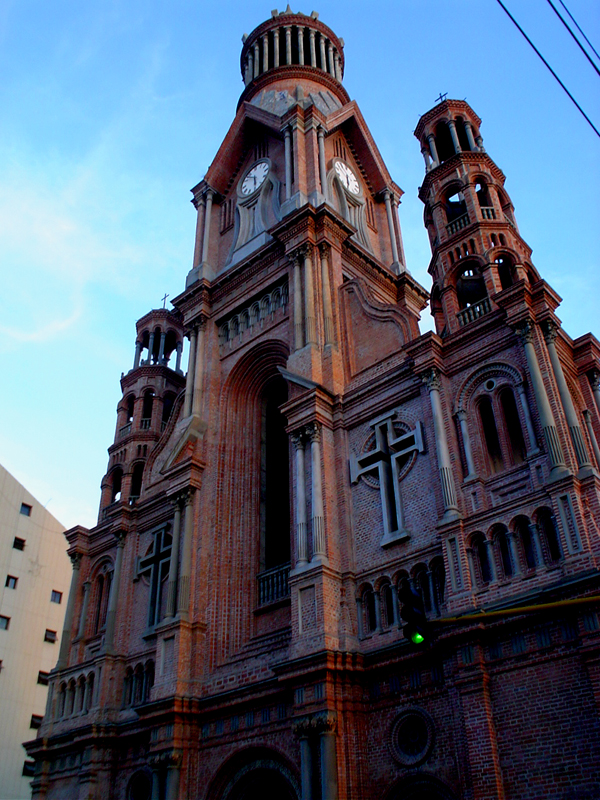
Cathedral of Our Lady of the Rosary of Palmar

The Roman Catholic Diocese of Palmira (Latin: Palmiranus) is a diocese located in the city of Palmira in the ecclesiastical province of Cali in Colombia.

== History ==
- 17 December 1952: Established as Diocese of Palmira from the Diocese of Cali and Archdiocese of Popayán

== Bishops ==
=== Ordinaries ===
- Jesús Antonio Castro Becerra (1952.12.18 – 1983.08.20)
- José Mario Escobar Serna (1983.08.20 – 2000.10.13)
- Orlando Antonio Corrales García (2001.04.09 – 2007.01.12) Appointed, Archbishop of Santa Fe de Antioquia
- Abraham Escudero Montoya(2007.02.02 – 2009.11.06)
- Edgar de Jesús García Gil (2010.03.24 – present)

=== Coadjutor bishop ===
- José Mario Escobar Serna (1982-1983)

== See also ==
- Roman Catholicism in Colombia
