= Juan Francisco Sarasti Jaramillo =

Colombian catholic priest (1938–2021)

Juan Francisco Sarasti Jaramillo CIM
- Archbishop of Cali
- Church: Catholic Church
- Archdiocese: Archdiocese of Cali
- In office: 17 August 2002 – 18 May 2011
- Predecessor: Isaías Duarte Cancino
- Successor: Darío de Jesús Monsalve Mejía
- Previous posts: Archbishop of Ibagué (1993-2002); Bishop of Barrancabermeja (1983-1993); Titular Bishop of Egara (1978-1983); Auxiliary Bishop of Cali (1978-1983)

Orders
- Ordination: 30 March 1963
- Consecration: 6 May 1978 by Alberto Uribe Urdaneta

Personal details
- Born: 30 July 1938 Cali, Valle del Cauca Department, Colombia
- Died: 25 February 2021 (aged 82) Cali, Valle del Cauca Department, Colombia

Juan Francisco Sarasti Jaramillo (30 July 1938 – 25 February 2021) was a Colombian Roman Catholic archbishop.

== Biography ==
Sarasti Jaramillo was born in Cali, Colombia and was ordained to the priesthood in 1963. He served as titular bishop of Egara and as auxiliary bishop of the Roman Catholic Archdiocese of Cali, Colombia, from 1978 to 1983. He then served as bishop of the Roman Catholic Diocese of Barrancabermeja, Colombia from 1983 to 1993 and as archbishop of the Roman Catholic Archdiocese of Ibagué, Colombia from 1993 to 2002. He served as archbishop of the Cali Archdiocese from 2002 to 2011.

Sarasti Jaramillo died from complications from COVID-19 in his hometown of Cali during the COVID-19 pandemic in Colombia on 25 February 2021, at the age of 82.
