= Ignacio Gómez Aristizábal =

Colombian Roman Catholic archbishop (1929–2026)

His Excellency Ignacio José Gómez Aristizábal
- Archbishop Emeritus of Santa Fe de Antioquia
- Church: Catholic Church
- Archdiocese: Santa Fe de Antioquia
- Appointed: 10 October 1992
- Term ended: 12 January 2007
- Predecessor: Eladio Acosta Arteaga
- Successor: Orlando Antonio Corrales García
- Other posts: Apostolic Administrator of Cúcuta (2008–2009); Apostolic Administrator of Barrancabermeja (2009–2010); Apostolic Administrator of Tibú (2010–2011)
- Previous post: Bishop of Ocaña (1972–1992)

Orders
- Ordination: 17 August 1958
- Consecration: 8 September 1972 by Alfonso Uribe Jaramillo, Alberto Uribe Urdaneta and Alfredo Rubio Diaz

Personal details
- Born: 2 December 1929 El Peñol, Antioquia Department, Colombia
- Died: 5 June 2026 (aged 96) Medellín, Colombia
- Motto: Cristo Es Nuestra Paz

Ignacio José Gómez Aristizábal (2 December 1929 – 5 June 2026) was a Colombian Roman Catholic prelate who served as Bishop of Ocaña from 1972 to 1992 and as Archbishop of the Santa Fe de Antioquia from 1992 until his retirement in 2007.

== Early life and formation ==
Gómez Aristizábal was born on 2 December 1929 in El Peñol, in the department of Antioquia, Colombia. He pursued his ecclesiastical studies at the Major Seminary of Medellín, where he completed his philosophical and theological formation in preparation for priesthood.

He was ordained a priest on 17 August 1958. Following his ordination, he exercised pastoral ministry in various assignments within the Church in Colombia, contributing to parish and diocesan life prior to his appointment to the episcopate.

== Bishop of Ocaña ==
On 24 July 1972, Pope Paul VI appointed Gómez Aristizábal as Bishop of Ocaña. He received episcopal consecration on 8 September 1972.

As Bishop of Ocaña, he led the diocese for two decades, overseeing its pastoral, administrative, and evangelizing mission during a period marked by social and ecclesial developments in Colombia. His ministry included strengthening parish structures and promoting the pastoral work of clergy and religious within the diocese.

== Archbishop of Santa Fe de Antioquia ==
On 10 October 1992, Pope John Paul II appointed him Archbishop of Santa Fe de Antioquia. In this role, he succeeded Archbishop Eladio Acosta Arteaga and assumed responsibility for guiding the metropolitan archdiocese in northwestern Colombia.

During his episcopal ministry, Gómez Aristizábal also participated in the activities of the Latin American Episcopal Council (CELAM), contributing to broader regional ecclesial collaboration in Latin America.

His tenure as archbishop extended until 12 January 2007, when his resignation was accepted by Pope Benedict XVI upon reaching the age limit established by canon law for diocesan bishops. Upon retirement, he assumed the title Archbishop Emeritus of Santa Fe de Antioquia.

== Later life and death ==
Following his retirement from active diocesan governance, Gómez Aristizábal remained recognized as Archbishop Emeritus within the Colombian Episcopal Conference.

Gómez Aristizábal died on 5 June 2026, at the age of 96.

Catholic Church titles
Preceded by Eladio Acosta Arteaga	Archbishop of Santa Fe de Antioquia; 1992–2007	Succeeded by Orlando Antonio Corrales García
Preceded by Rafael Sarmiento Peralta	Bishop of Ocaña; 1972–1992	Succeeded by Jorge Enrique Lozano Zafra
