= St. Anne's Cathedral, Ocaña =

Coordinates: 8.2346°N 73.3538°W

St. Anne's Cathedral
- Catedral de Santa Ana
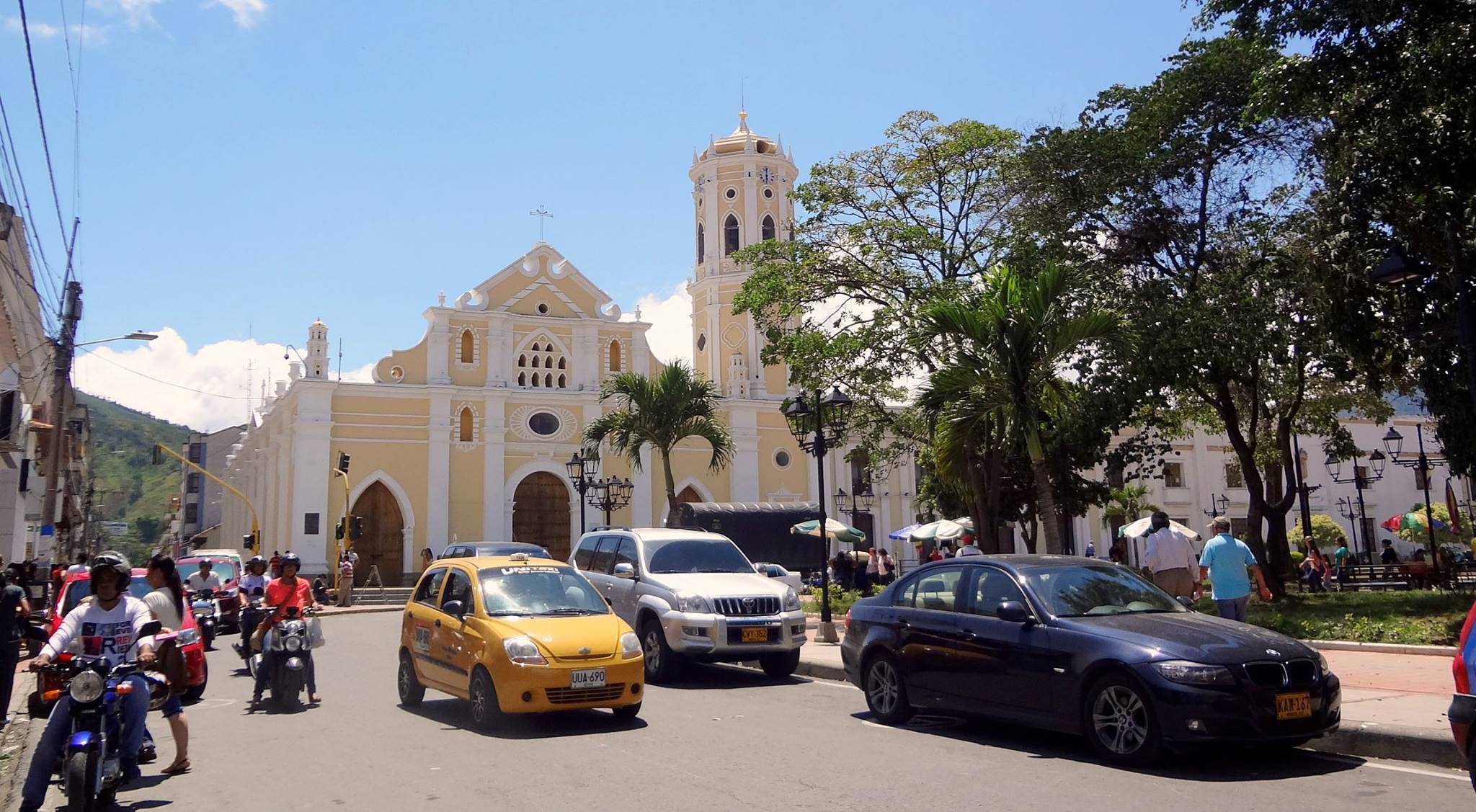
- St. Anne's Cathedral
- Location: Ocaña
- Country: Colombia
- Denomination: Roman Catholic Church

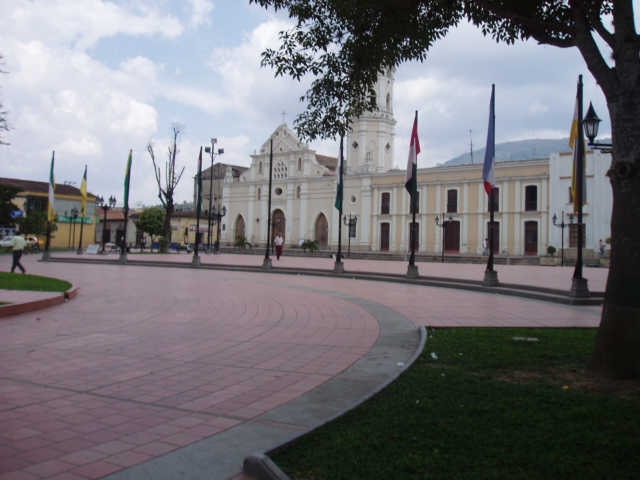
Another view

St. Anne's Cathedral (Spanish: Catedral de Santa Ana), also called Ocaña Cathedral, is a cathedral church of Catholic worship consecrated to St. Anne. It is a neoclassical building located on the south side of the 29 de mayo park in the city of Ocaña in Norte de Santander department, in the northern part of Colombia. The cathedral is the seat of the Roman Catholic Diocese of Ocaña.

The first church was built in 1564, and it was rebuilt after an earthquake in Cúcuta in 1875. In 1992, the paintings on wood were replaced with new ones with the same iconography dedicated to St Anne.

== See also ==
- Roman Catholicism in Colombia
