= Apostolic Vicariate of Guapi =

Catholic missionary jurisdiction in Colombia

Apostolic Vicariate of Guapi Apostolicus Vicariatus Guapiensis

Location
- Country: Colombia

Statistics
- Area: 10,000 km^{2} (3,900 sq mi)
- Population: Total; Catholics: (as of 2010); 132,000; 128,000 (97%)
- Parishes: 5

Information
- Denomination: Catholic Church
- Rite: Roman Rite
- Established: 5 April 1954 (72 years ago)
- Cathedral: Catedral de La Inmaculada Concepción

Current leadership
- Pope: Leo XIV
- Vicar Apostolic: Alfonso García López

Map

The Vicariate Apostolic of Guapi (Latin: Apostolicus Vicariatus Guapiensis) in the Catholic Church is located in the town of Guapi, Cauca in Colombia.

== History ==
On 5 April 1954 Pope Pius XII established the Prefecture Apostolic of Guapi from the Prefecture Apostolic of Tumaco. Blessed John Paul II elevated it to a Vicariate Apostolic on 13 February 2001.

== Ordinaries ==
- José de Jesús Arango, O.F.M. † (23 Apr 1954 – 1969) Died
- José Miguel López Hurtado, O.F.M. † (28 Nov 1969 – 1982) Resigned
- Alberto Lee López, O.F.M. † (8 Mar 1985 – 1992) Died
- Rafael Morales Duque, O.F.M. † (5 May 1994 – 13 Feb 2001) Resigned
- Hernán Alvarado Solano † (13 Feb 2001 – 31 Jan 2011) Died
- Carlos Alberto Correa Martínez (3 Dec 2013 - 19 Mar 2024)
- Fr. Arnulfo Moreno Quiñonez, Pro-Vicar (11 May 2024 – 14 Jun 2025)
- Alfonso García López (since 14 Jun 2025)

== See also ==
- Roman Catholicism in Colombia
