= Fernando Cano Almirante =

Spanish Roman Catholic bishop

His Most Reverend Fernando Cano Almirante
- Bishop of Canarias
- Diocese: Canarias
- Predecessor: Manuel Bernardo Morete Bodelón
- Successor: Bernardo Martínez Carnero

Orders
- Consecration: by Bartolomé María de las Heras Navarro

Personal details
- Born: 12 December 1761
- Died: 22 September 1826 (aged 64)
- Denomination: Roman Catholic

Styles of Fernando Cano Almirante
- Reference style: The Most Reverend
- Spoken style: Your Grace
- Religious style: Bishop

Fernando Cano Almirante O.F.M. (Born 12 December 1761, died 22 September 1826) was a Spanish prelate of the Catholic Church, who served successively as bishop of Antioquia, Colombia and bishop of Canarias, Canary Islands, Spain.

== Biography ==
Born in Spain in December 1761, he studied for the priesthood and became a member of the Order of the Observant Friars Minor (also known as Franciscans) in February 1778.

Pope Pius VI appointed him bishop of Antioquia in Colombia on 11 November 1818 and he was consecrated bishop on 1 October 1820. Pius VI then appointed him to the diocese of Canarias, in the Canary Islands on 17 June 1825. He died while in office in Gran Canaria on 22 September 1826.

Catholic Church titles
Preceded by None	Bishop of Antioquia; 1818 - 1825	Succeeded by Mariano Garnica y Orjuela
Preceded by Manuel Bernardo Morete Bodelón	Bishop of Canarias; 1825 - 1826	Succeeded by Bernardo Martínez Carnero
