= Centenaria, Algeria =

Ancient civitas extant during the Roman Empire

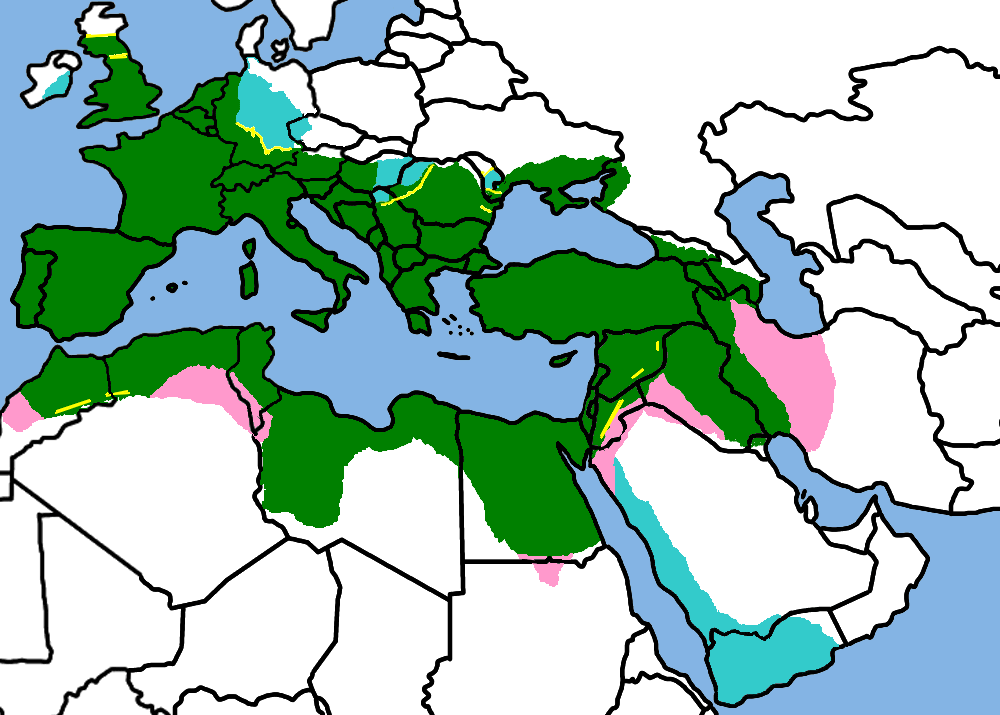
Map of the Roman Empire show Limes.

Centenaria was an ancient civitas (town) extant during the Roman Empire. It is tentatively identified as ruins near El Hamel Algeria. The name Centenaria derives from the Centenaria style of fortified farm, around 2000 of which were built along the Limes Africanus in Roman North Africa. Many Centenaria grew to be prosperous and large settlements.

The town of Centenaria was also the seat of an ancient bishopric, which ceased to effectively function in the 7th century. One bishop is known from antiquity, Flourentius (fl.484) who attended the Council of Carthage (484). chrétienne (303–533) The bishopric was re-established in name during the 20th century and has had 6 titular bishops (mostly from South America) since. The current bishop is Hermenegildo José Torres Asanza who replaced Luis Adriano Piedrahíta Sandoval in 2007.
