= Eladio Acosta Arteaga =

Colombian prelate

- Archbishop of Archdiocese of Santa Fe de Antioquiaa
- Church: Roman Catholic Church
- See: Archdiocese of Santa Fe de Antioquia
- In office: 1970–1992
- Predecessor: Guillermo Escobar Vélez
- Successor: Ignacio José Gómez Aristizábal
- Previous post: Priest

Orders
- Ordination: 7 August 1949
- Rank: Bishop

Personal details
- Born: 9 April 1916 La América, Colombia
- Died: 30 January 2012 (aged 95)

Eladio Acosta Arteaga (9 April 1916 – 30 January 2012) was a Colombian Prelate of Roman Catholic Church.

Arteaga was born in La América, Colombia in 1916 and was ordained a priest on 7 August 1949 from the religious order of Congregation of Jesus and Mary. Arteaga was appointed bishop of the Archdiocese of Santa Fe de Antioquia on 6 March 1970 and ordained in April. He would remain at the diocese until his retirement on 10 October 1992. He died in 2012, aged 95.
