= Isaías Duarte Cancino =

Colombian archbishop (1939–2002)

His Excellency, The Most Reverend Isaías Duarte Cancino
- Archbishop of Cali
- Church: Catholic Church
- Appointed: August 19, 1995
- Term ended: March 16, 2002
- Predecessor: Pedro Rubiano Sáenz
- Successor: Juan Francisco Sarasti Jaramillo
- Other posts: Archbishop of Cali (1995–2002); Bishop of Apartadó (1988–1995)

Orders
- Ordination: December 1, 1963 by Héctor Rueda Hernández
- Consecration: June 17, 1985 by Héctor Rueda Hernández

Personal details
- Born: Isaías Duarte Cancino; February 15, 1939 San Gil, Santander, Colombia
- Died: March 16, 2002 (aged 63) Cali, Valle del Cauca, Colombia
- Denomination: Roman Catholic
- Occupation: Catholic archbishop and theology
- Profession: Catholic archbishop and theology
- Education: Pontifical Gregorian University

Styles of Isaías Duarte Cancino
- Reference style: The Most Reverend
- Spoken style: Your Excellency
- Religious style: Your Excellency

Ordination history of Isaías Duarte Cancino
History
Priestly ordination
- Ordained by: Héctor Rueda Hernández
Episcopal consecration
- Consecrated by: Héctor Rueda Hernández

Monsignor Isaías Duarte Cancino (February 15, 1939 in San Gil, Santander – March 16, 2002 in Cali, Valle del Cauca) was a Colombian Catholic bishop, who from 1995 until the day of his death was archbishop of the Archdiocese of Cali.

In 2012 Colombian justice determined that it was the commander of the Eastern Bloc of the FARC who gave the order to assassinate Duarte. But the commanders were exonerated in March 2013 by a judge of the High Court of Cali.

== Trajectory ==
Isaías Duarte Cancino was born in San Gil, Santander on February 15, 1939, in the home formed by Crisanto Duarte Pilonieta and Elisa Cancino Arenas. He was the youngest of seven siblings. He did his high school in Bucaramanga at Colegio Santander.

Then he entered the seminary of Pamplona, Norte de Santander. In Rome, during the Second Session of the Second Vatican Council, he was ordained a priest by Bishop Hector Rueda Hernandez on December 1, 1963.

== Returning to Colombia ==
Incardinated in the Archdiocese of Bucaramanga, he arrived there at the end of 1964. He was the first seminarian in the diocese who had completed his studies in Rome and was now a new presbyter.

He was vicar cooperator of the Cathedral of Bucaramanga, professor in the Major Seminary of Pamplona, parish priest of the parish of the Holy Spirit in Bucaramanga, in the Cathedral of the Holy Family of Bucaramanga. Later, in the parish of San Juan de Girón and in the province of García Rovira in the city of Málaga, all these places of evangelization knew of his apostolic zeal, of his cherished faith and of his concern to leave works of spiritual and social benefit.

Duarte collaborated in the formation of priests as teacher and Spiritual Director, first in Pamplona and then in the nascent Major Seminary of Floridablanca. He also served as spiritual director of the candidates for the priesthood in the Seminary of Bucaramanga and simultaneously as Vicar of Pastoral in the Archdiocese of Bucaramanga.

On April 10, 1985, he was named titular bishop of Germania de Numidia and Auxiliary of Bucaramanga and was consecrated on the following June 17. He was the first Auxiliary Bishop of the Archdiocese of Bucaramanga, whose Ordinary was the then President of the Episcopal Conference, Monsignor Héctor Rueda Hernández. His particular interest in establishing a section of the Pontifical Bolivarian University of Medellín in the Archdiocese of Bucaramanga deserves special mention. This was achieved almost immediately.

On June 18, 1988, he was named the first bishop of the Diocese of Apartadó, in the department of Antioquia, at a small city tormented by war.

On August 19, 1995, Pope John Paul II named him Archbishop of the Archdiocese of Cali, replacing Monsignor Pedro Rubiano Sáenz. He took office on the following Saturday, September 23.

== Death ==
Monsignor Isaías Duarte Cancino was a strong critic of Colombian guerrillas such as the Revolutionary Armed Forces of Colombia (FARC) and the National Liberation Army (ELN), as well as drug trafficking groups and associates, especially after the kidnapping of La María Church by the ELN, which he publicly excommunicated.

He was killed on 16 March 2002 by two armed men who shot him as he was leaving a religious ceremony (a collective marriage of more than 100 couples in the Buen Pastor church, Aguablanca district) in Cali. Pope John Paul II expressed his sorrow at the murder of the archbishop of Cali and urged Colombians to continue through dialogue and to reject any kind of violence, blackmail and kidnapping.

His funeral rites took place on Tuesday, March 19, and were presided over by the Cardinal Pedro Rubiano Sáenz, Archbishop of Bogotá, in the presence of more than 70 bishops from all over Latin America who traveled to the city of Cali, Colombian President Andrés Pastrana and his cabinet, presidential candidates, civil, ecclesiastical and military authorities from Valle del Cauca, and more than 20,000 faithful who accompanied him in Caicedo Square in front of the Cathedral.

The authorities were following the lead that the perpetrators of the crime were members of the Norte del Valle cartel. Surprising statements by a man arrested for carrying illegal weapons led prosecutors to suspect the FARC guerrilla. Ten years later, the Second Specialized Criminal Court in Cali convicted the FARC's top leader, alias Timochenko and three other guerrilla commanders, alias 'Efraín Guzmán', 'Pablo Catatumbo' and 'Iván Márquez', as intellectual authors. However, the High Court of Cali overturned the decision because the witness refused to testify in court on the grounds that the Public Prosecutor's Office had not honoured the agreements it had made with him. Five years later, in March 2017, it became known that the Colombian state had not paid the informant the reward of a billion Colombian pesos.

== See also ==
- Martyr

== Bibliography ==
- AP / New York Times. Pope Lauds Slain Colombian Archbishop. March 17, 2002.
- The Telegraph. Archbishop Isaias Duarte Cancino (obituary). 19 Mar 2002.
- Duarte Cancino, Isaías (Abp.). La Iglesia y los Derechos Humanos. En el Quincuagésimo Aniversario de la Declaración Universal de los Derechos Humanos (The Church and the Human Rights. In the 50th Anniversary of the Universal Declaration of Human Rights. Spanish).
