= Aguas Claras Airport =

Aguas Claras Airport Aeropuerto Aguas Claras
- IATA: OCV; ICAO: SKOC

Summary
- Airport type: Public
- Operator: Government
- Serves: Ocaña, Colombia
- Location: Aguas Claras
- Elevation AMSL: 3,850 ft (1,170 m)
- Coordinates: 8°18′55″N 73°21′30″W

Map
- Location within Norte de Santander Department Location within Colombia

Runways
Direction	Length		Surface
Direction	m	ft	Surface
01/19	1,150	3,773	Asphalt
- Sources: WAD GCM Google Maps

Aguas Claras Airport (Spanish: Aeropuerto Aguas Claras) (IATA: OCV, ICAO: SKOC) is an airport serving Ocaña, a municipality of the Norte de Santander Department of Colombia.

The airport is 6 kilometres (3.7 mi) north of Ocaña.

== Airlines and destinations ==
Airlines	Destinations
SATENA	Cùcuta, Medellin–Olaya Herrera

== Accidents and incidents ==
- On 30 April 2003, Basler BT-67 PNC-0212 of the Servicio Aéreo de Policia was damaged beyond repair when it overran the runway at Aguas Claras Airport.

== See also ==
- Transport in Colombia
- List of airports in Colombia
