= Archdiocese of Cali =

Latin Catholic jurisdiction in Colombia

Coordinates: 3.4509°N 76.5324°W

Archdiocese of Cali Archidioecesis Caliensis

Catholic

Location
- Country: Colombia
- Ecclesiastical province: Cali

Statistics
- Area: 2,504 km^{2} (967 sq mi)
- Population: Total; Catholics: (as of 2006); 2,606,000; 2,215,000 (85.0%)

Information
- Denomination: Catholic Church
- Sui iuris church: Latin Church
- Rite: Roman Rite
- Established: 7 June 1910 (116 years ago)
- Cathedral: Catedral de San Pedro

Current leadership
- Pope: Leo XIV
- Archbishop: Luis Fernando Rodríguez Velásquez
- Auxiliary Bishops: Luis Fernando de Jesús Pérez Agudelo, Arnulfo Moreno Quiñonez
- Bishops emeritus: Darío de Jesús Monsalve Mejía

Map

Website
- www.arquidiocesiscali.org

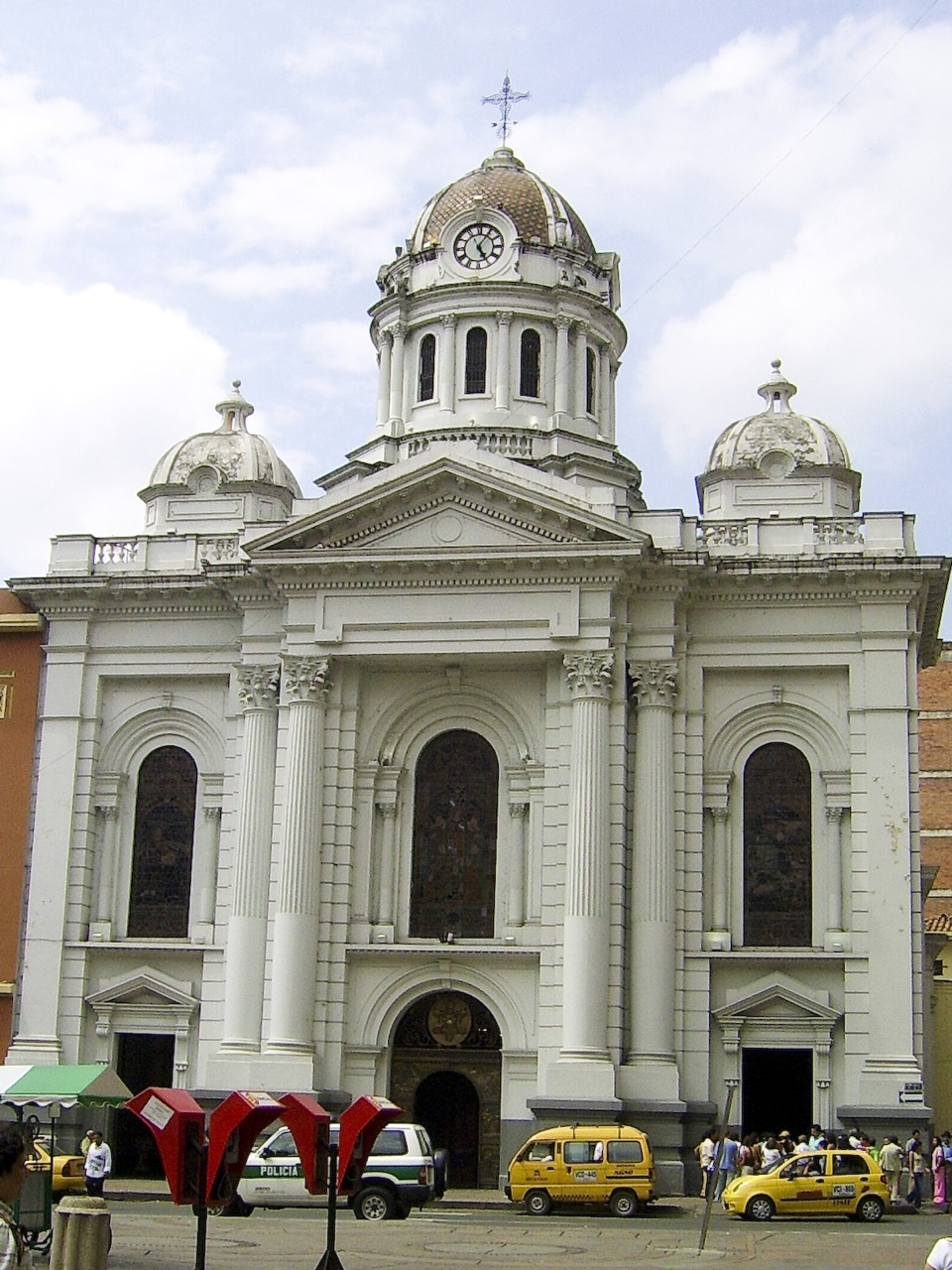
Cathedral of St. Peter

The Archdiocese of Cali (Latin: Archidioecesis Caliensis) is a Latin Church ecclesiastical jurisdiction or archdiocese of the Catholic Church in Colombia. Its episcopal see is located in the city of Cali.

== History ==
On 7 June 1910, the Diocese of Cali was established from part of the Metropolitan Archdiocese of Popayán. On 20 June 1964, the Diocese was promoted to Metropolitan Archdiocese of Cali.

In the 1970s and 1980s, the Archdiocese struggled with Cali's explosive population growth, with the number of priests and Religious not rising as fast.

During the 1990s and early 2000s, the Cali area was subject to organized crime, attempted murders, and revolution. The Archbishop and priests of the Archdiocese were outspoken against violent crimes, and in favor of charity. For his temerity in criticizing gangsters and terrorists, in March 2002, Archbishop Duarte was assassinated by gang members, which made him a martyr of the Church.

== Bishops ==
=== Ordinaries ===
- Bishops of Cali
  - Heladio Posidio Perlaza Ramírez (1911.08.11 – 1926.09.28)
  - Luis Adriano Díaz Melo (1927.04.13 – 1947.11.13)
  - Julio Caicedo Téllez, S.D.B. (1948.02.23 – 1958.09.24)
  - Francisco Gallego Pérez (1958.12.18 – 1960.05.21)
  - Alberto Uribe Urdaneta (1960.07.13 – 1964.06.20)
- Archbishops of Cali
  - Alberto Uribe Urdaneta (1964.06.20 – 1985.02.07)
  - Pedro Rubiano Sáenz (1985.02.07 – 1994.12.27), appointed Archbishop of Bogotá (Cardinal in 2001)
  - Isaías Duarte Cancino (1995.08.19 – 2002.03.16)
  - Juan Francisco Sarasti Jaramillo, C.I.M. (2002.08.17 – 2011.05.18)
  - Darío de Jesús Monsalve Mejía (2011.05.18 – 2022.12.08)
  - Luis Fernando Rodríguez Velásquez (2022.12.08 – present)

=== Coadjutor archbishops ===
- Pedro Rubiano Sàenz (1983–1985); future Cardinal
- Darío de Jesús Monsalve Mejía (2010–2011)

=== Auxiliary bishops ===
- Miguel Antonio Medina y Medina (1952–1959), appointed Auxiliary Bishop of Medellín
- Augusto Aristizábal Ospina (1969–1977), appointed Bishop of Jericó
- Juan Francisco Sarasti Jaramillo, C.I.M. (1978–1983), appointed Bishop of Barrancabermeja (later returned here as Archbishop)
- Héctor Luis Gutiérrez Pabón (1987–1998), appointed Bishop of Chiquinquirá
- Alfonso Cabezas Aristizábal, C.M. (1988–1992), appointed Coadjutor Bishop of Villavicencio
- Julio Enrique Prado Bolaños (1992–1995), appointed Bishop of Pasto
- Edgar de Jesús Garcia Gil (1992–2002), appointed Bishop of Montelibano
- José Soleibe Arbeláez (1999–2002), appointed Bishop of Caldas
- Luis Adriano Piedrahíta Sandoval (1999–2007), appointed Bishop of Apartadó
- Gonzalo Restrepo Restrepo (2003–2006), appointed Bishop of Girardota
- Julio Hernando García Peláez (2005–2010), appointed Bishop of Istmina-Tadó
- José Alejandro Castaño Arbeláez, O.A.R. (2006–2010), appointed Bishop of Cartago
- José Daniel Falla Robles (2009–2016), appointed Bishop of Soacha
- Luis Fernando Rodríguez Velásquez (2014–2022), appointed coadjutor here and succeeded in the same year
- Juan Carlos Cárdenas Toro (2015–2020), appointed Bishop of Pasto
- Luis Fernando de Jesús Pérez Agudelo (since 2026)
- Arnulfo Moreno Quiñonez (since 2026)

=== Other priests of this diocese who became bishops ===
- Fernando Torres Durán, appointed Auxiliary Bishop of Panamá in 1996
- Héctor Epalza Quintero (priest here, 1965-1989), appointed Bishop of Buenaventura in 2004

== Suffragan dioceses ==
- Buenaventura
- Buga
- Cartago
- Palmira

== See also ==
- Roman Catholicism in Colombia
