= Quintero (surname) =

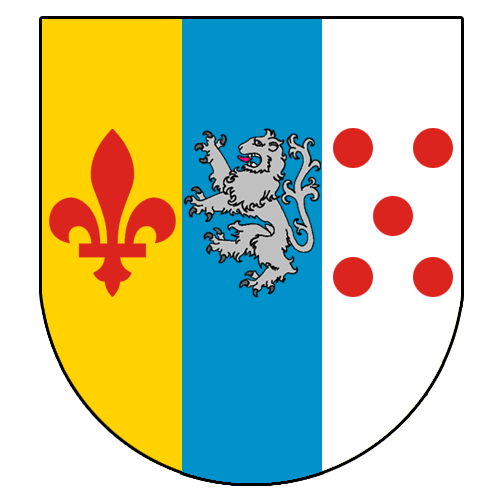
- Quintero Coat of Arms
- Pronunciation: Quintero

Origin
- Origin: Latin
- Meaning: The fifth takers
- Region of origin: Spain, Castile

Quintero is a Spanish surname originating in the Spanish region of Galicia. The name comes from quinto or quinta which means "fifth". It may be that the term "quintero" originally referred to "A man who collects the King's Fifth Part". In other words, "A Tax Collector for the King of Spain". The King would have selected noble families whom he could trust and rely on to gather the fifth part of everything that his subjects owned, produced, or cultivated. This was done yearly and went into the coffers of the King for his personal needs and to run his government.

It is also possible that a "quintero" was a renter of quintas (also known as haciendas, the Spanish equivalent to a ranch). The quintero would rent one-fifth of the land and pay as rent one-fifth of his produce of the land to the landlord.

It may also be the case that the surname is habitational, derived from a place called Quintero in Ourense province, so named from Galician quinteiro, meaning "farmstead".

== Notable people ==
- Alejandra Quintero (born 1976), Mexican beauty pageant contestant
- Armando Quintero Martínez (born 1954), Mexican politician
- Dafne Quintero (born 2002), Mexican archer
- Diógenes Quintero (1989–2026), Colombian lawyer, human rights defender, and politician
- Gabriela Quintero (born 1973), Mexican musician of Rodrigo y Gabriela
- Hannelly Quintero (born 1985), Venezuelan model and presenter
- Humberto Quintero (born 1979), Venezuelan baseball player
- Ioamnet Quintero (born 1972), Cuban high jumper
- Jarlín Quintero (born 1993), Colombian footballer
- José Quintero (1924–1999), Panamanian theatre director and teacher
- José Quintero Parra (1902–1984), Venezuelan cardinal
- José Agustín Quintero (1829–1885), Cuban journalist and revolutionary
- Juan Fernando Quintero (born 1993), Colombian footballer
- Luis Manuel Quintero (1725? – 1810), one of the 44 original settlers of the Pueblo de Los Angeles
- Nydia Quintero Turbay (1932–2025), Colombian civic leader and philanthropist, First Lady of Colombia (1978–1982)
- Quintero brothers, Spanish dramatists:
  - Hermanos Álvarez Quintero (1871–1938)
  - Joaquín Álvarez Quintero (1873–1944)
- Rafael Caro Quintero (born 1952), Mexican drug lord
- Valentina Quintero (born 1954), Venezuelan journalist, environmental activist, radio and television hostess.
- Cristóbal Quintero (1450–1503), a native of Palos de la Frontera, Spain, navigator and Spanish explorer who participated in the discovery of America. He sailed with Christopher Columbus on his first three voyages and was an owner of the ship "La Pinta", one of the three ships that sailed in the discovery of America in 1492.

== Related surnames ==
- Quintana
- Quinteros
- Quinto
