= La Playa de Belén =

Coordinates: 8°15′N 73°10′W

La Playa
- Municipality and town
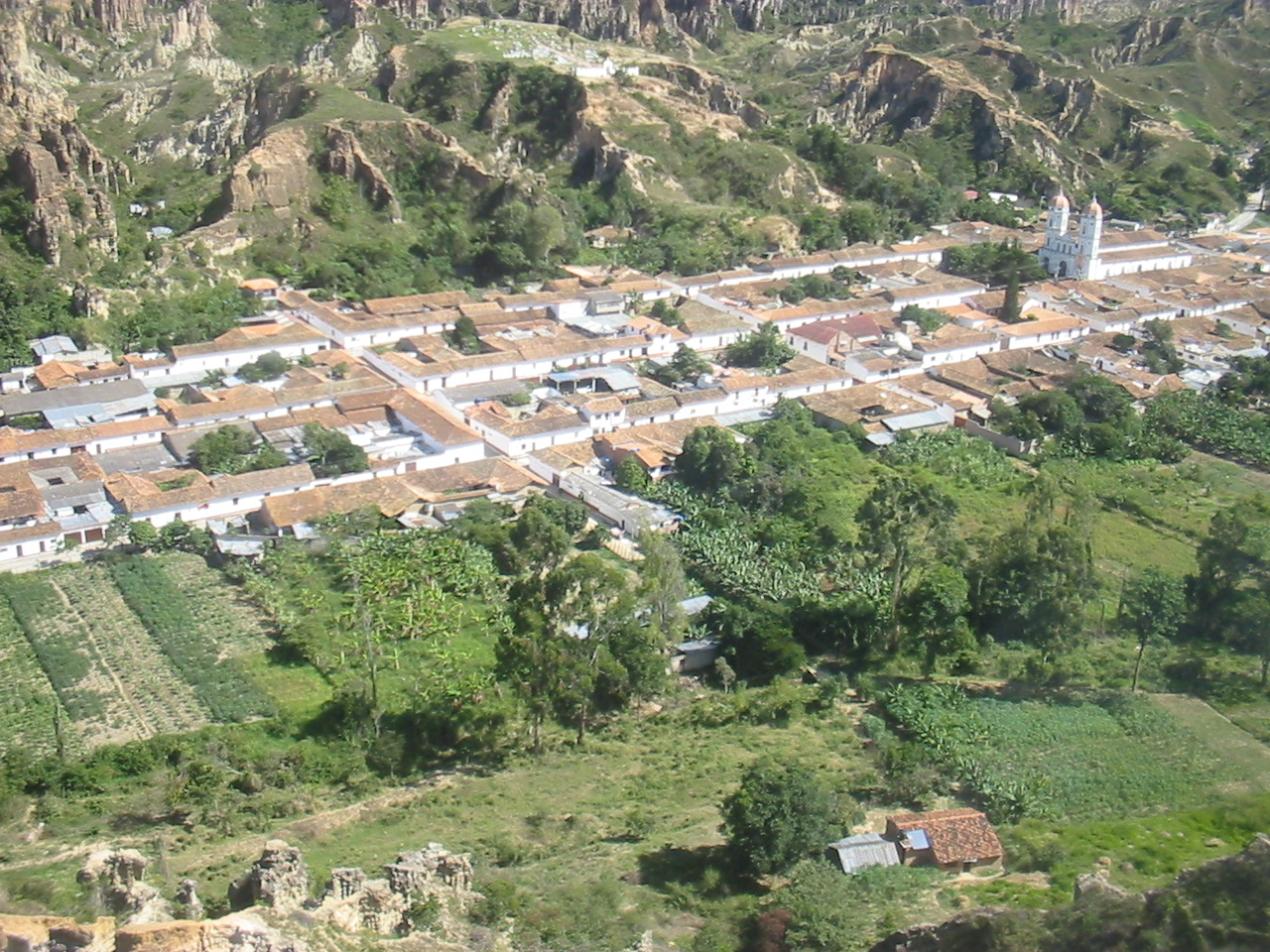
- View of La Playa de Belén

- Flag

- Location of the municipality and town of La Playa in the Norte de Santander Department of Colombia.
- Country: Colombia
- Department: Norte de Santander Department

Area
  - Municipality and town: 241.25 km^{2} (93.15 sq mi)
- Elevation: 1,450 m (4,760 ft)

Population (2015)
  - Municipality and town: 8,546
  - Urban: 641
- Time zone: UTC-5 (Colombia Standard Time)

La Playa or La Playa de Belén is a Colombian municipality in the department of North Santander.

La Playa is among Colombia's most-atmospheric and best-preserved 19th-century pueblos. It was named a Pueblo Patrimonio (heritage town) of Colombia in 2010, one of only 11 municipalities nationwide that were selected to be part of the Red Turística de Pueblos Patrimonio original cohort.

== Climate ==
La Playa has a tropical savanna climate (Köppen: Aw) with consistently warm temperatures, moderated by altitude. The period from December to March is fairly dry, while the rest of the year experiences significant rainfall.

Climate data for La Playa (Playa La), elevation 1,500 m (4,900 ft), (1981–2010)
Month	Jan	Feb	Mar	Apr	May	Jun	Jul	Aug	Sep	Oct	Nov	Dec	Year
Mean daily maximum °C (°F)	23.9 (75.0)	24.8 (76.6)	25.5 (77.9)	25.9 (78.6)	26.2 (79.2)	26.6 (79.9)	27.0 (80.6)	27.1 (80.8)	26.3 (79.3)	25.3 (77.5)	24.2 (75.6)	23.5 (74.3)	25.5 (77.9)
Daily mean °C (°F)	18.6 (65.5)	19.2 (66.6)	19.8 (67.6)	20.3 (68.5)	20.5 (68.9)	20.5 (68.9)	20.7 (69.3)	20.6 (69.1)	20.1 (68.2)	19.8 (67.6)	19.4 (66.9)	18.9 (66.0)	19.9 (67.8)
Mean daily minimum °C (°F)	14.1 (57.4)	14.7 (58.5)	15.1 (59.2)	16.0 (60.8)	15.7 (60.3)	15.1 (59.2)	14.8 (58.6)	14.8 (58.6)	15.1 (59.2)	15.5 (59.9)	15.3 (59.5)	14.6 (58.3)	15.1 (59.2)
Average precipitation mm (inches)	13.2 (0.52)	15.5 (0.61)	24.6 (0.97)	71.2 (2.80)	100.7 (3.96)	62.3 (2.45)	44.4 (1.75)	89.7 (3.53)	140.6 (5.54)	158.3 (6.23)	83.0 (3.27)	29.1 (1.15)	824.1 (32.44)
Average precipitation days	4	4	6	11	13	9	10	13	17	17	13	7	123
Average relative humidity (%)	84	82	81	83	82	80	77	79	83	85	85	84	82
Mean monthly sunshine hours	186.0	158.1	148.8	123.0	139.5	174.0	204.6	192.2	144.0	142.6	138.0	161.2	1,912
Mean daily sunshine hours	6.0	5.6	4.8	4.1	4.5	5.8	6.6	6.2	4.8	4.6	4.6	5.2	5.2
Source: Instituto de Hidrologia Meteorologia y Estudios Ambientales
