= Archdiocese of Santa Fe de Antioquia =

Catholic archdiocese in Colombia

Coordinates: 6.5571°N 75.8274°W

Archdiocese of Santa Fe de Antioquia Archidioecesis Sanctae Fidei de Antioquia

Catholic

Location
- Country: Colombia
- Ecclesiastical province: Santa Fe de Antioquia

Statistics
- Area: 11,803 km^{2} (4,557 sq mi)
- Population: Total; Catholics: (as of 2004); 180,000; 160,000 (88.9%)

Information
- Denomination: Catholic Church
- Rite: Latin Rite
- Established: 8 August 1804 (69 years ago)
- Cathedral: Catedral Basílica Metropolitana Nuestra Señora de la Inmaculada Concepción

Current leadership
- Pope: Leo XIV
- Archbishop: Hugo Torres Marín
- Bishops emeritus: Orlando Antonio Corrales García

Map

Website
- www.arquisantioquia.org.co

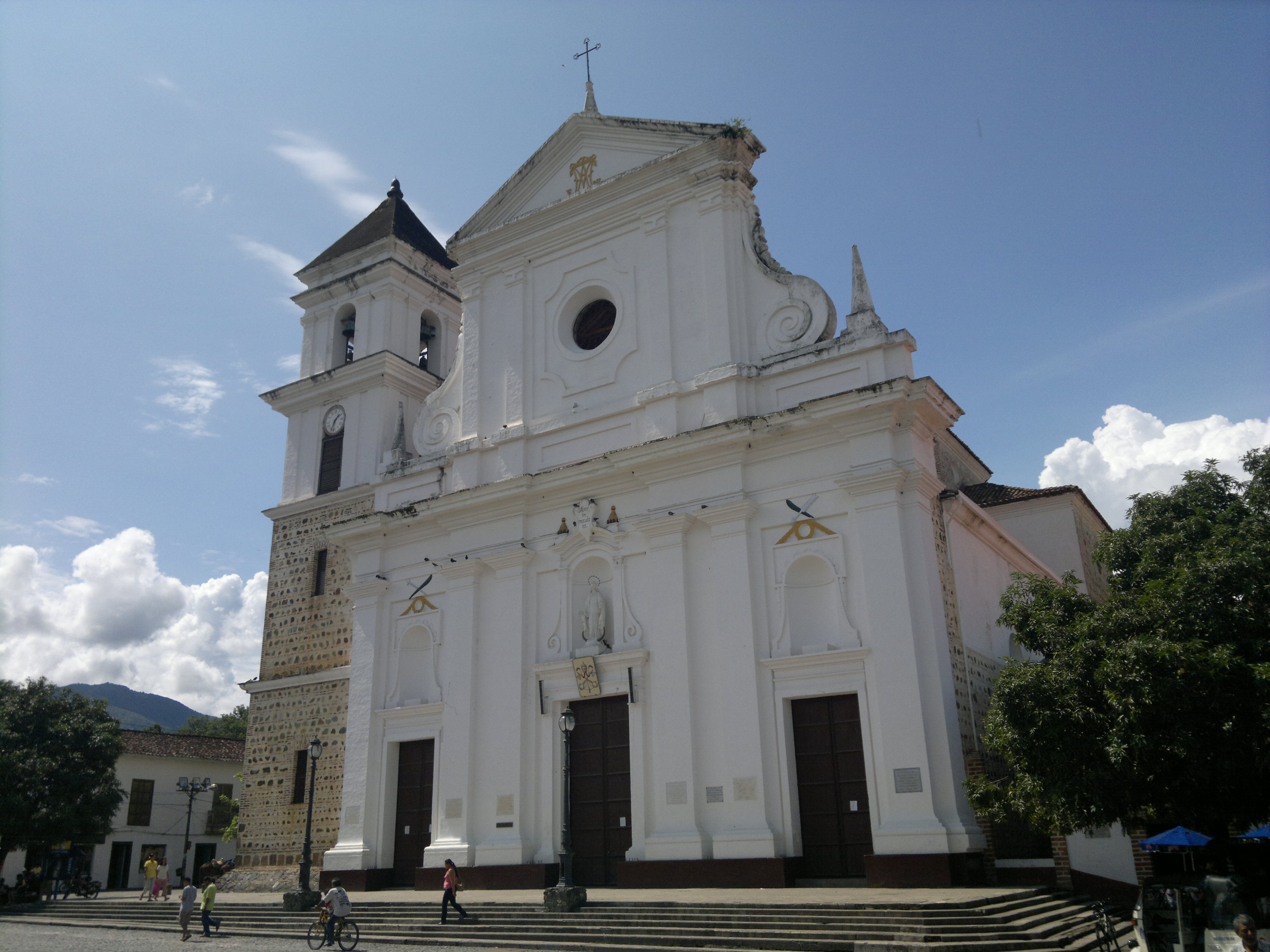
Metropolitan Cathedral-Basilica of Our Lady of the Immaculate Conception

The Roman Catholic Archdiocese of Santa Fe de Antioquia (Latin: Sanctae Fidei de Antioquia) is an archdiocese located in the city of Santa Fe de Antioquia in Colombia.

== History ==
- 8 August 1804: Established as Diocese of Antioquía from the Diocese of Cartagena, Diocese of Popayán and Metropolitan Archdiocese of Santafé en Nueva Granada
- 5 February 1917: Renamed as Diocese of Antioquía – Jericó
- 3 July 1941: Renamed as Diocese of Antioquía, because Jericó was erected as separate diocese
- 18 June 1988: Promoted as Metropolitan Archdiocese of Santa Fe de Antioquia

== Bishops ==
=== Ordinaries ===
- Bishops of Antioquía
  - Fernando Cano Almirante, O.F.M. † (21 Dec 1818 – 19 Dec 1825) Confirmed, Bishop of Islas Canarias
  - Mariano Garnica y Orjuela, O.P. † (21 May 1827 – 10 Aug 1832) Died
  - José María Estévez † (Appointed 19 Dec 1834; Died before appointment)
  - Juan de la Cruz Gómez y Plata † (24 Jul 1835 – 1 Dec 1850) Died
  - Domingo Antonio Riaño Martínez † (13 Jan 1854 – 20 Jul 1866) Died
  - Joaquín Guillermo González † (21 Mar 1873 – 9 Aug 1883) Resigned
  - Jesús María Rodríguez Balbín † (9 Aug 1883 – 30 Jul 1891) Died
  - Juan Nepomuceno Rueda Rueda † (30 Jan 1892 – 1900) Resigned
  - José Maria Villalba † (25 Sep 1900 – 1901) Died
  - Manuel Antonio López de Mesa † (30 May 1902 – 15 May 1908) Died
  - Maximiliano Crespo Rivera † (18 Oct 1910 – 7 Feb 1917) Appointed, Bishop of Santa Rosa de Osos
- Bishops of Antioquía – Jericó
  - Francisco Cristóbal Toro † (8 Feb 1917 – 3 Jul 1941) Appointed, Bishop of Antioquía
- Bishops of Antioquía
  - Francisco Cristóbal Toro † (3 Jul 1941 – 16 Nov 1942) Died
  - Luis Andrade Valderrama, O.F.M. † (16 Jun 1944 – 9 Mar 1955) Resigned
  - Guillermo Escobar Vélez † (1 Apr 1955 – 28 Jul 1969) Resigned
  - Eladio Acosta Arteaga, C.I.M. † (6 Mar 1970 – 18 Jun 1988) Appointed, Archbishop of Santa Fe de Antioquia
- Archbishops of Santa Fe de Antioquia
  - Eladio Acosta Arteaga, C.I.M. † (18 Jun 1988 – 10 Oct 1992) Resigned
  - Ignacio José Gómez Aristizábal (10 Oct 1992 – 12 Jan 2007) Resigned
  - Orlando Antonio Corrales García (12 Jan 2007 – 3 May 2022) Resigned
  - Hugo Torres Marín (25 Jan 2023 – Present)

=== Auxiliary bishop ===
- Guillermo Escobar Vélez † (1952-1955), appointed Bishop here

== Suffragan dioceses ==
- Apartadó
- Istmina–Tadó
- Quibdó
- Santa Rosa de Osos

== See also ==
- Roman Catholicism in Colombia
