= Ocaña, Colombia =

Ocaña
- Municipality and city
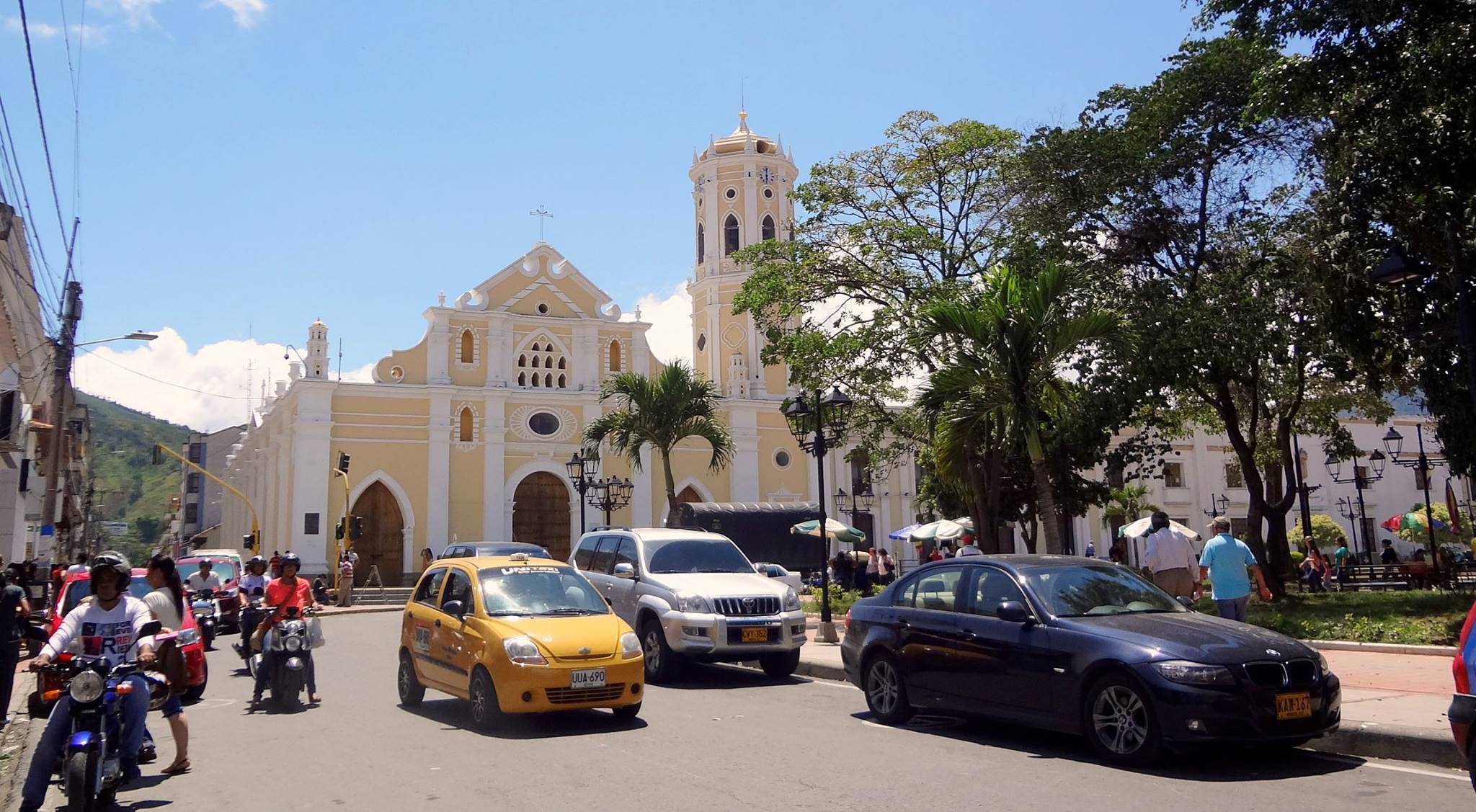
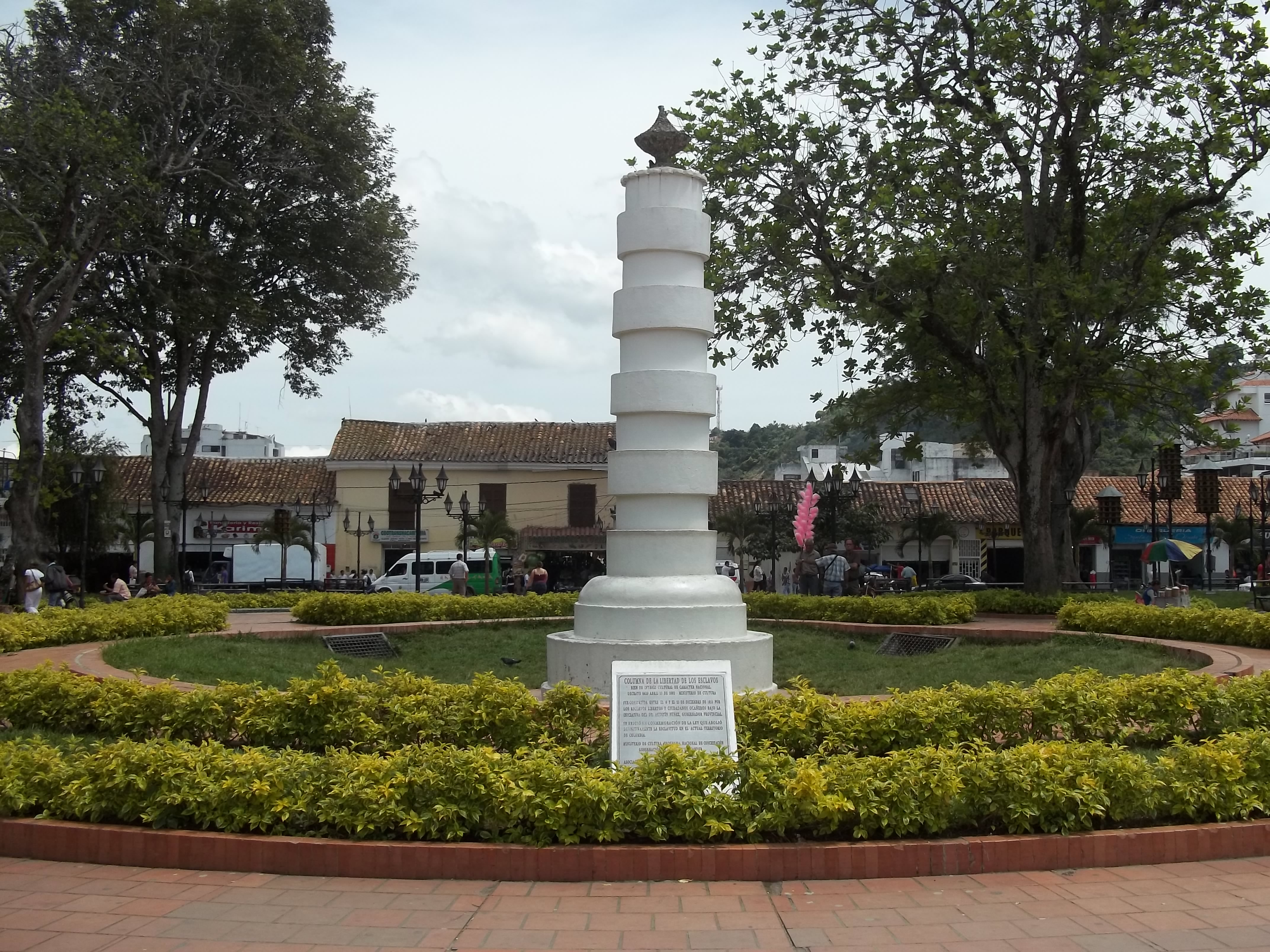
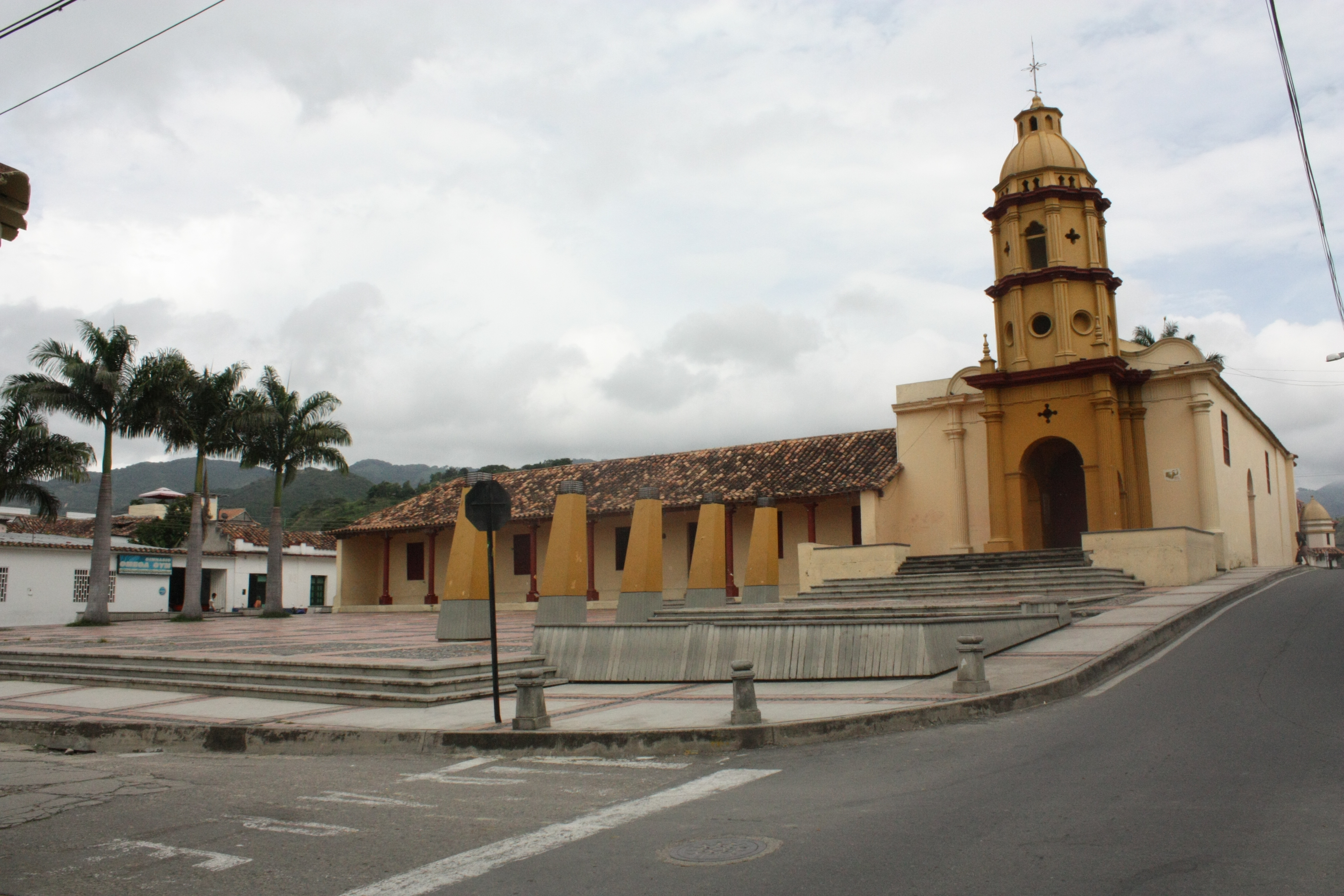
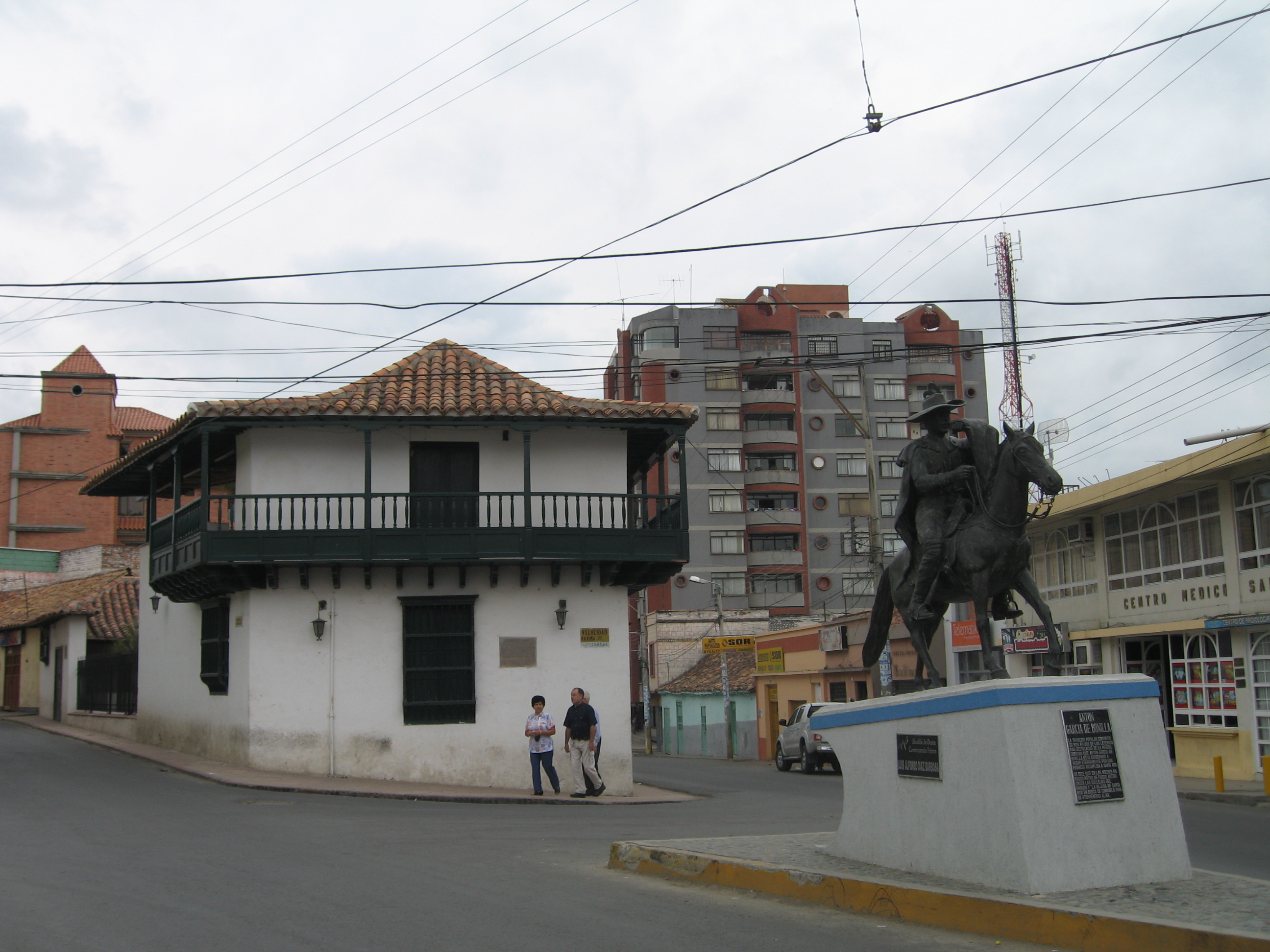
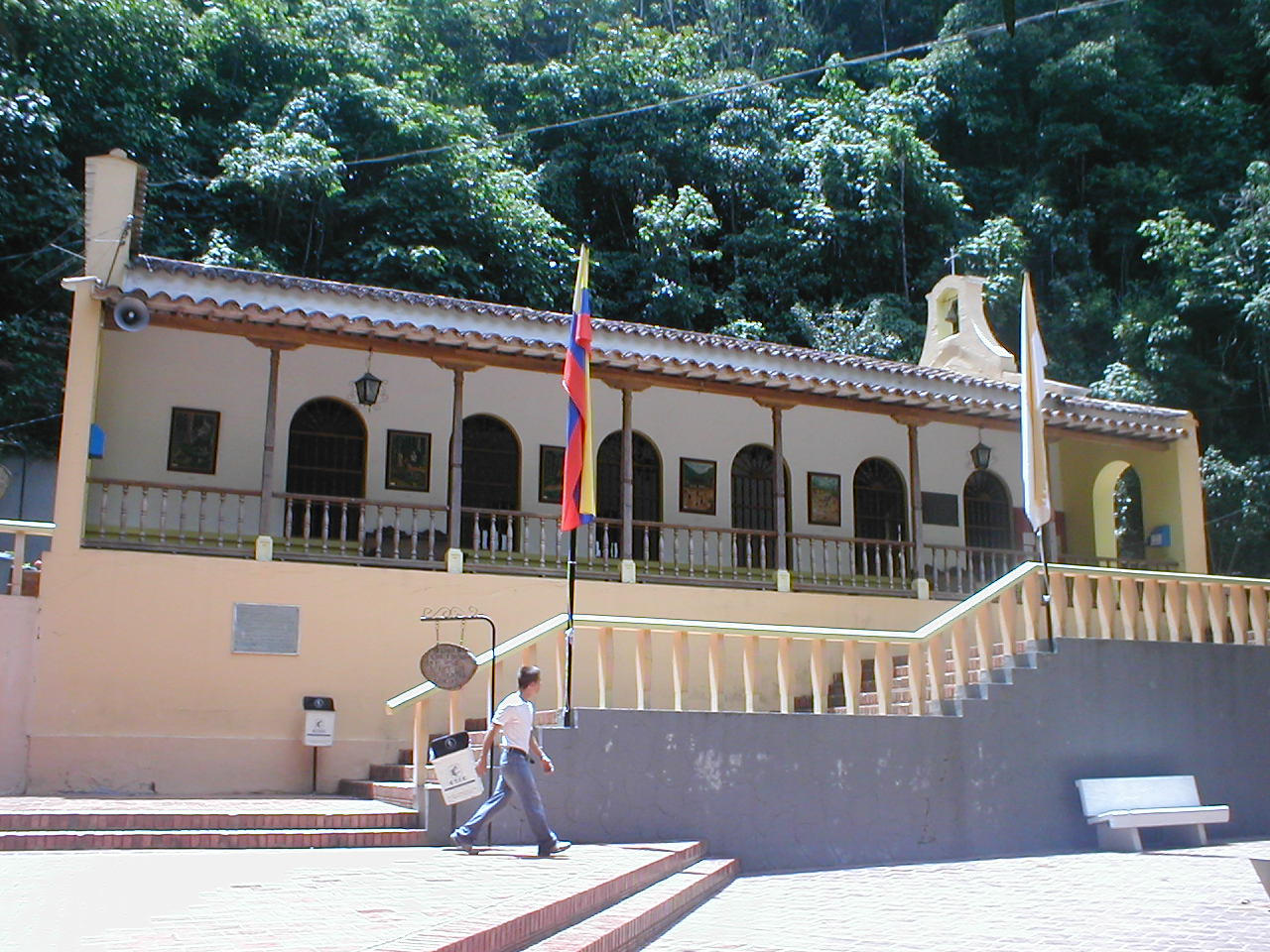
- Clockwise from top: Santa Ana Cathedral, Historical Complex of the Great Convention, Nuestra Señora de las Gracias de Torcoroma Sanctuary, Antón García de Bonilla Museum & Main Park Column

- Flag Coat of arms

- Location of the municipality and town of Ocaña in the Norte de Santander Department of Colombia.

- Location in Colombia
- Coordinates: 8°14′N 73°21′W
- Country: Colombia
- Department: Norte de Santander
- Founded: 1570
- Incorporated: 1857

Government
  - Mayor: Samir Casadiego

Area
  - Municipality and city: 522.6 km^{2} (201.8 sq mi)
  - Urban: 10.18 km^{2} (3.93 sq mi)
- Elevation: 1,202 m (3,944 ft)

Population (2020 est.)
  - Municipality and city: 129,308
  - Density: 247.4/km^{2} (640.8/sq mi)
  - Urban: 116,232
  - Urban density: 11,420/km^{2} (29,570/sq mi)
- Demonym: Ocañero
- Time zone: UTC-5 (Colombia Standard Time)
- Area code: 57 + 7
- Website: www.ocana-nortedesantander.gov.co

Ocaña is a city and municipality in Norte de Santander Department of Colombia. Ocaña is the second largest populated center of this department. It played an important role during the Independence of Colombia from the Spanish monarchy.

== History ==
The city was founded on 14 December 1570 by Captain Francisco Fernández de Contreras, as part of the third populating project of the east, patronised by the Audiencia y Cabildo de Pamplona. Contreras chose the Hacaritama Indigenous Society in order to have more control over the indigenous population of the area and thus be able to found the city. The first name the city received was Santa Ana de Hacarí when it was founded in 1570. During 1575, it was assigned the status of city with its current name, Ocaña. During the time of colonization, Fernandez de Contreras stated that all merchandise coming from Spain and destined for the Madgalena River should pass through the city. The city served as a commercial route during the Viceroyalty to connect the city of Pamplona with the Colombian Caribbean Coast. It also contributed to the development of commercial activities during the post-independence period. Given the geographic location of the settlement, the Audiencia de Santafé, presided over by Andrés Díaz Venero de Leiva, decided that the new town would fall under the jurisdiction of the province of Santa Maria, the governor of which was, at the time, Don Pedro Fernández del Busto. The name Ocaña was given to the new town to honour Fernández del Busto, who was born in Ocaña, Spain. The native peoples in the region were those traditionally called Hacaritamas and those called Cultura Mosquito (Mosquito Culture) or Bajomagdalenense.

In 1828, Ocaña was the site of the inconclusive Convention of Ocaña led by Vice-president Santander where delegates attempted to reform Gran Colombia's written constitution. In 1849, during the period of the New Granada, the Congress ordered the creation of the province of Ocaña, in order to create a Provincial Chamber to legislate the creation of schools and land roads, in addition to organizing the public force and fairs. During the second half of the 19th century, Ocaña adopts a Librecambista model, which generates that the area of Ocaña begins to establish commercial routes with Europe and North America. In 1935, the History Center of Ocaña was created, today it is the History Academy of Ocaña, in order to promote culture, in this had been members, historians, poets and influential musicians such as Lucio Pabón, thirteenth governor of Norte de Santander, the writer Luis Eduardo Paez Courvel influential in the literature of the department and one of the most prominent poets of the city, Jorge Pacheco Quintero.

== Geography and climate ==
1. Location: 8°14′N 73°21′W. The city of Ocaña is 610 km from Bogotá.
2. Surface: 460 km^{2}, 2.2% of the North Santander Department total area
3. Height: 1,202 meters on the level of the sea Ocaña are on the Andean Eastern mountain range. The 2,600 mountains surround that reach msnm. Its average temperature is 22 °C.

Climate data for Ocaña (Univ Fco P Santand), elevation 1,150 m (3,770 ft), (1981–2010)
Month	Jan	Feb	Mar	Apr	May	Jun	Jul	Aug	Sep	Oct	Nov	Dec	Year
Mean daily maximum °C (°F)	26.2 (79.2)	26.6 (79.9)	27.0 (80.6)	26.9 (80.4)	27.1 (80.8)	27.5 (81.5)	28.0 (82.4)	27.8 (82.0)	27.2 (81.0)	26.6 (79.9)	25.9 (78.6)	25.4 (77.7)	26.9 (80.4)
Daily mean °C (°F)	20.4 (68.7)	20.9 (69.6)	21.5 (70.7)	21.7 (71.1)	22.0 (71.6)	22.0 (71.6)	22.1 (71.8)	22.1 (71.8)	21.8 (71.2)	21.5 (70.7)	21.1 (70.0)	20.6 (69.1)	21.5 (70.7)
Mean daily minimum °C (°F)	13.7 (56.7)	14.2 (57.6)	15.2 (59.4)	16.3 (61.3)	16.9 (62.4)	16.2 (61.2)	15.3 (59.5)	15.6 (60.1)	16.1 (61.0)	16.3 (61.3)	16.1 (61.0)	14.9 (58.8)	15.6 (60.1)
Average precipitation mm (inches)	15.5 (0.61)	12.4 (0.49)	50.0 (1.97)	118.1 (4.65)	141.4 (5.57)	66.8 (2.63)	57.5 (2.26)	81.3 (3.20)	169.6 (6.68)	145.3 (5.72)	117.7 (4.63)	25.0 (0.98)	1,000.5 (39.39)
Average precipitation days	3	2	7	12	15	9	9	13	17	17	12	5	122
Average relative humidity (%)	86	84	83	84	86	84	83	83	85	86	87	87	85
Mean monthly sunshine hours	179.8	149.6	124.0	108.0	127.1	150.0	179.8	164.3	126.0	130.2	120.0	145.7	1,704.5
Mean daily sunshine hours	5.8	5.3	4.0	3.6	4.1	5.0	5.8	5.3	4.2	4.2	4.0	4.7	4.7
Source: Instituto de Hidrologia Meteorologia y Estudios Ambientales

Climate data for Ocaña (Aguas Claras Airport), elevation 1,435 m (4,708 ft), (1981–2010)
Month	Jan	Feb	Mar	Apr	May	Jun	Jul	Aug	Sep	Oct	Nov	Dec	Year
Mean daily maximum °C (°F)	25.7 (78.3)	26.3 (79.3)	26.8 (80.2)	27.1 (80.8)	27.4 (81.3)	27.5 (81.5)	27.8 (82.0)	27.8 (82.0)	27.2 (81.0)	26.7 (80.1)	26.0 (78.8)	25.6 (78.1)	26.8 (80.2)
Daily mean °C (°F)	20.1 (68.2)	20.8 (69.4)	21.3 (70.3)	21.7 (71.1)	21.9 (71.4)	21.8 (71.2)	21.8 (71.2)	21.7 (71.1)	21.5 (70.7)	21.4 (70.5)	21.0 (69.8)	20.4 (68.7)	21.3 (70.3)
Mean daily minimum °C (°F)	14.3 (57.7)	15.2 (59.4)	15.8 (60.4)	17.0 (62.6)	17.2 (63.0)	16.4 (61.5)	15.9 (60.6)	16.1 (61.0)	16.5 (61.7)	16.7 (62.1)	16.2 (61.2)	15.4 (59.7)	16.1 (61.0)
Average precipitation mm (inches)	9.4 (0.37)	19.3 (0.76)	46.0 (1.81)	94.6 (3.72)	144.3 (5.68)	83.1 (3.27)	71.6 (2.82)	114.1 (4.49)	163.3 (6.43)	149.7 (5.89)	67.1 (2.64)	26.2 (1.03)	988.5 (38.92)
Average precipitation days	2	4	6	11	15	11	11	15	19	17	11	6	125
Average relative humidity (%)	83	82	82	83	83	83	81	84	85	86	86	86	84
Mean monthly sunshine hours	217.0	175.0	155.0	132.0	145.7	174.0	201.5	182.9	153.0	148.8	153.0	189.1	2,027
Mean daily sunshine hours	7.0	6.2	5.0	4.4	4.7	5.8	6.5	5.9	5.1	4.8	5.1	6.1	5.6
Source: Instituto de Hidrologia Meteorologia y Estudios Ambientales

== Economy ==
The main economic activities are agriculture, the livestock raising, commerce, small industries and mining, with silver operation, copper and iron. The city is served by the Aguas Claras airport.

== Twin towns – sister cities ==
- Iztapalapa, Mexico

== See also ==
- Cúcuta, the state capital
- Pamplona, the third municipality of the state
- Diocese of Ocaña
- St. Anne's Cathedral, Ocaña
