= San Luis, Antioquia =

San Luis
- Municipality
- Municipio de San Luis en Antioquia

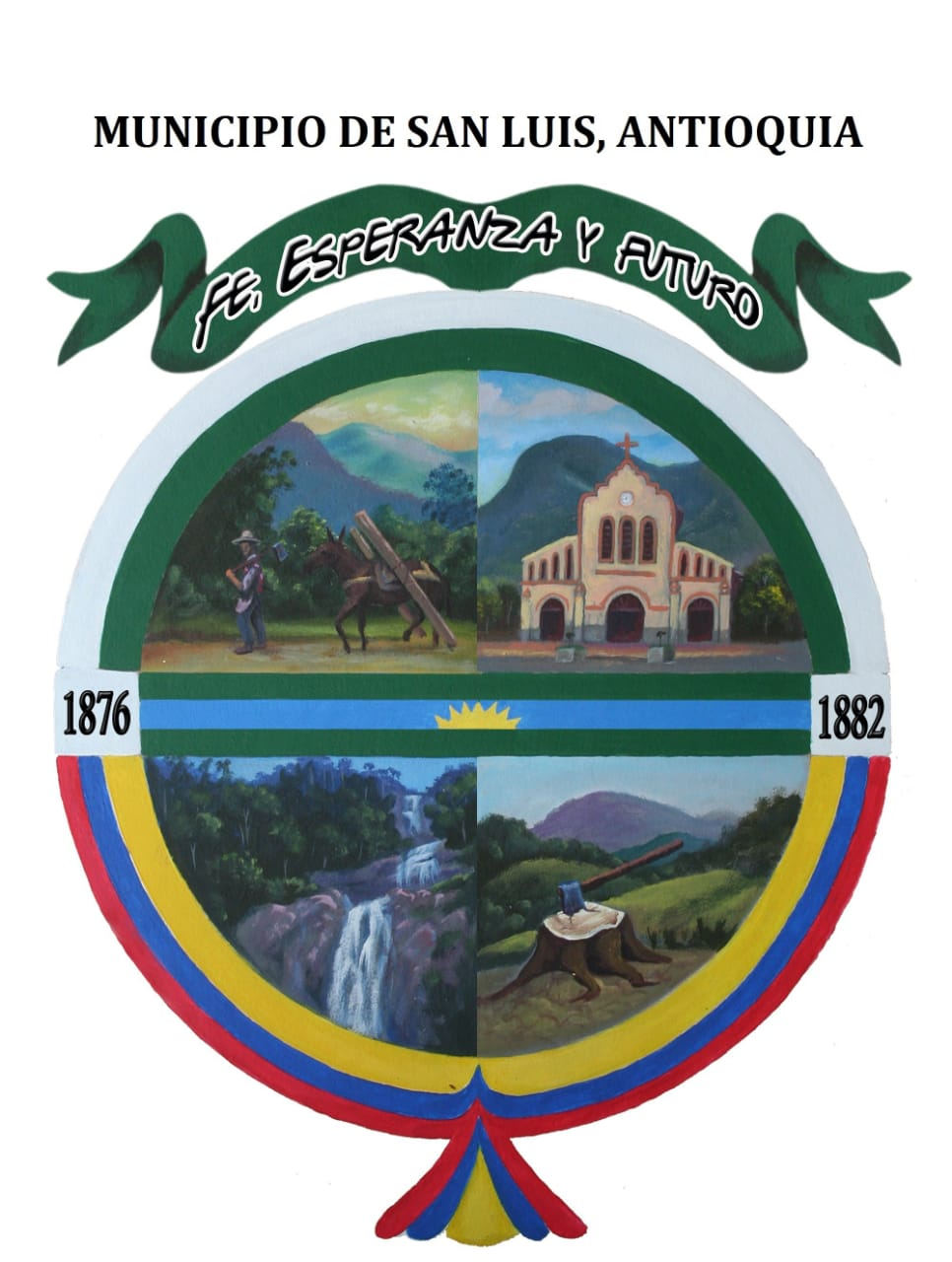
- Flag Coat of arms

- Location of San Luis in the Antioquia Department

- Location in Colombia
- Coordinates: 6°02′32″N 74°59′36″W
- Country: Colombia
- Founded: 25 August 1876

Government
  - Body: Alcaldía de San Luis
  - Mayor: José Maximino Castaño Castaño; 2016–2019

Area
  - Total: 392 km^{2} (151 sq mi)
- Elevation: 1,005 m (3,297 ft)

Population (Census 2018)
  - Total: 7,155
  - Density: 18.3/km^{2} (47.3/sq mi)
- Time zone: UTC-5 (Colombia Standard Time)
- Postal code: 054430 to 054438
- Area code: +57 4
- Website: Official website

San Luis is a municipality in Colombia, located in the department of Antioquia. It is limited in the north by the municipalities of San Carlos and Puerto Nare, in the east by the municipality of Puerto Triunfo, in the south by the municipality of San Francisco and in the west by the municipalities of Cocorná and Granada.

The average temperature in San Luis is 28 Celsius or about 82 Fahrenheit. The municipality is located 124 kilometres (77 mi) from the city of Medellín, the capital of the department, and the municipality has an area of 453 square kilometres (175 sq mi). The population was 7,155 at the 2018 census.

== Initial settlement ==
Compared to other cities and municipalities in Antioquia, San Luis has a relatively short history. Migration to the region began in 1875 and continued throughout the late 19th century, driven by economic hardship in the region and a spirit of entrepreneurship and colonial expansion that was dominant during that time.

The founder of San Luis is widely considered to be Clemente Giraldo, a Presbyterian priest who sought to create a trading outpost between the cities of Granada and the Río Magdalena. Upon arriving in the region from Granada with several families, Giraldo reached a large stone cliff, named "el Castellón" in Spanish, on August 25, 1876, ow considered the official founding date of the municipality. Having found a defensible site in the mountains with plenty of forestry and available wood, Giraldo decided that this would be a very suitable site for the outpost. The settlers tested the fertility of the soil by planting banana trees, beans, sugar cane, and yuca and, after a successful harvest, returned to Granada to deliver news regarding the new settlement.

Once news of the successful settlement spread, additional settlers arrived from the nearby towns of El Peñol, Marinilla, and El Santuario. By 1878, the town had constructed its first church, a central park and was integrated as a segment of the municipality of San Carlos.

== Effects of the Colombian conflict ==
Since the 1960s, San Luis suffered a great deal during the Colombian Conflict, especially between 1994 and 2004. The city was frequently targeted by various terrorist and paramilitary organizations, including the FARC, ELN, and Frente IX and was subject to kidnappings, murders, and forced displacements. In 1997 alone there were 255 disappearances, 75 murders, 305 kidnappings and 51,513 displaced persons.

By 1999, San Luis was an active war zone and many families fled to other parts of the country. The period between 1999 and 2003 included several direct attacks on police and soldiers in the municipality. On December 12, 1999, 300 members of the FARC from the 9th and 47th fronts attacked the city's police station killing 9 policemen and wounding 4. One of the dead was Irma Rosa Gutiérrez, who was 6 months pregnant. On October 9, 2002, the FARC strapped bombs to an 11-year-old boy and sent him into the police station in the city's central park. The explosive was detected before it could be exploded.

== Post-conflict history ==
San Luis has flourished since 2006, both economically and culturally. Argos S.A., Colombia's largest producer of cement, first set up operations in San Luis in 1985, but significantly expanded those operations in 2006, employing more than 500 people and investing more than $700 million US dollars. Since 2015, the city has seen accelerated construction including a new, ongoing investment named Porvenir II, creating a dam, a hydropower plant, and a lake that is expected to attract even more tourism.

== Demography ==
- 'Total' Population: 10 939 hab. (2015)
- 'Urban' Population: 4694
- 'Rural' Population: 6245

== Economy ==
The economy of San Luis is agriculture based, which is heavily based upon fruits, vegetables, livestock, and an emphasis is placed on harvesting and on the exportation of wood. The city's exportation of wood is celebrated the last weekend of June each year in the "Fiestas de la Madera" (Festival of the Wood).

== Ecotourism ==
San Luis is still emerging as a tourist destination, and the tourism industry is focused upon eco-friendly tourism. The municipality has several interesting tourism destinations that are utilized both by visitors and locals alike.

- Cascada la Cuba (Waterfall The Cuba), is located at the side of the road that leads into the city, about 1.6 km from the Medellin-Bogota highway. The waterfall has a drop of more than 100m and is visited for its clean and clear water and natural environment.
- Cascada La Planta (Waterfall The Plant). This second waterfall requires the traveler to walk down a steep and narrow stone path. The waterfall is 30m contains a 15m x 10m body of water at the bottom in which visitors can swim. There is also an unsupervised diving platform to dive into the water below.
- El Dormilón (River Dormilón). The banks of the river are often used for picnics and the currents are such that one can swim in the river without much danger.
- Iglesia de San Luis Gonzaga (Church of San Luis Gonzaga). This is the church in the central park. It was built in 1884.
