= José María Córdova =

Colombian general

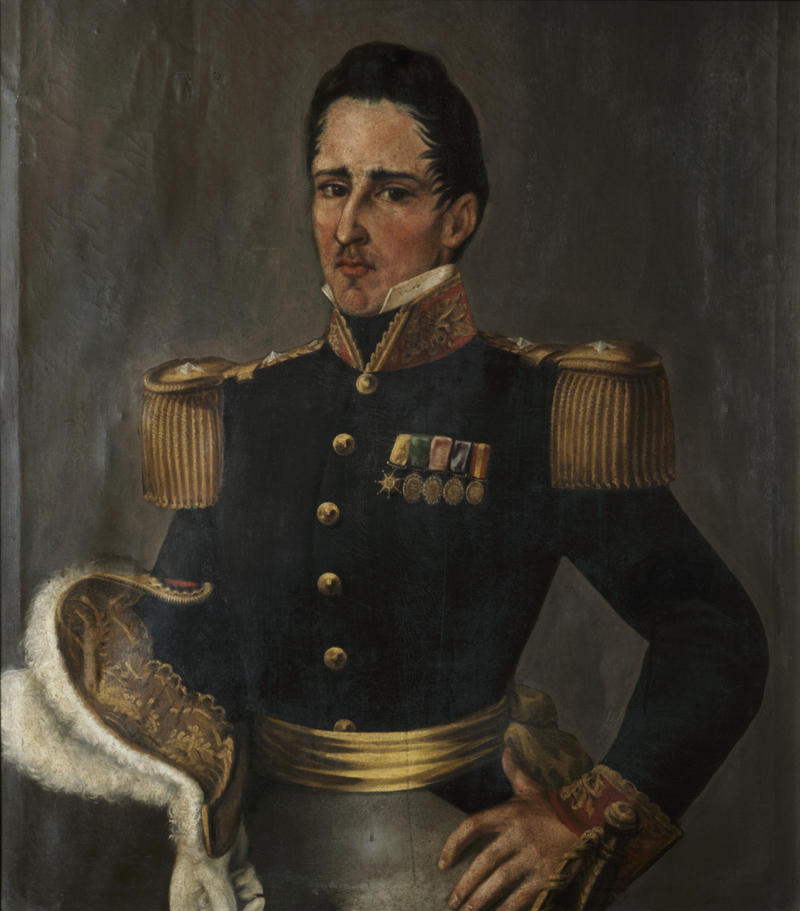
- Portrait of Córdova by Fermin Isaza, 1876. National Museum of Colombia
- Born: September 8, 1799; Concepción, Province of Antioquia, Viceroyalty of New Granada, Spanish Empire
- Died: October 17, 1829 (aged 30); Santuario, Province of Antioquia, Cundinamarca, Gran Colombia
- Military career
- Allegiance: United Provinces of New Granada(until 1819); Gran Colombia
- Service years: 1814–1829
- Rank: General of Division
- Nickname: "Hero of Ayacucho" "the one with the terrible look"
- Units: Antioquia Battalion, Rearguard Division
- Commands: 2nd Colombian Division
- Conflicts: Colombian Independence War: Battle of the Palo River (1815); Battle of Vargas Swamp (1819); Battle of Boyacá (1819); Battle of Pichincha (1821); Battle of Ayacucho (1824)
- Awards: Cross of Boyacá, Order of Liberators of Venezuela, Medal of the Liberators of Quito, Medal of Ayacucho

José María Córdova Muñoz, also known as the "Hero of Ayacucho", was a General of the Gran Colombian army during the Independence War of Colombia, Peru, and Bolivia from Spain.

== Early life ==
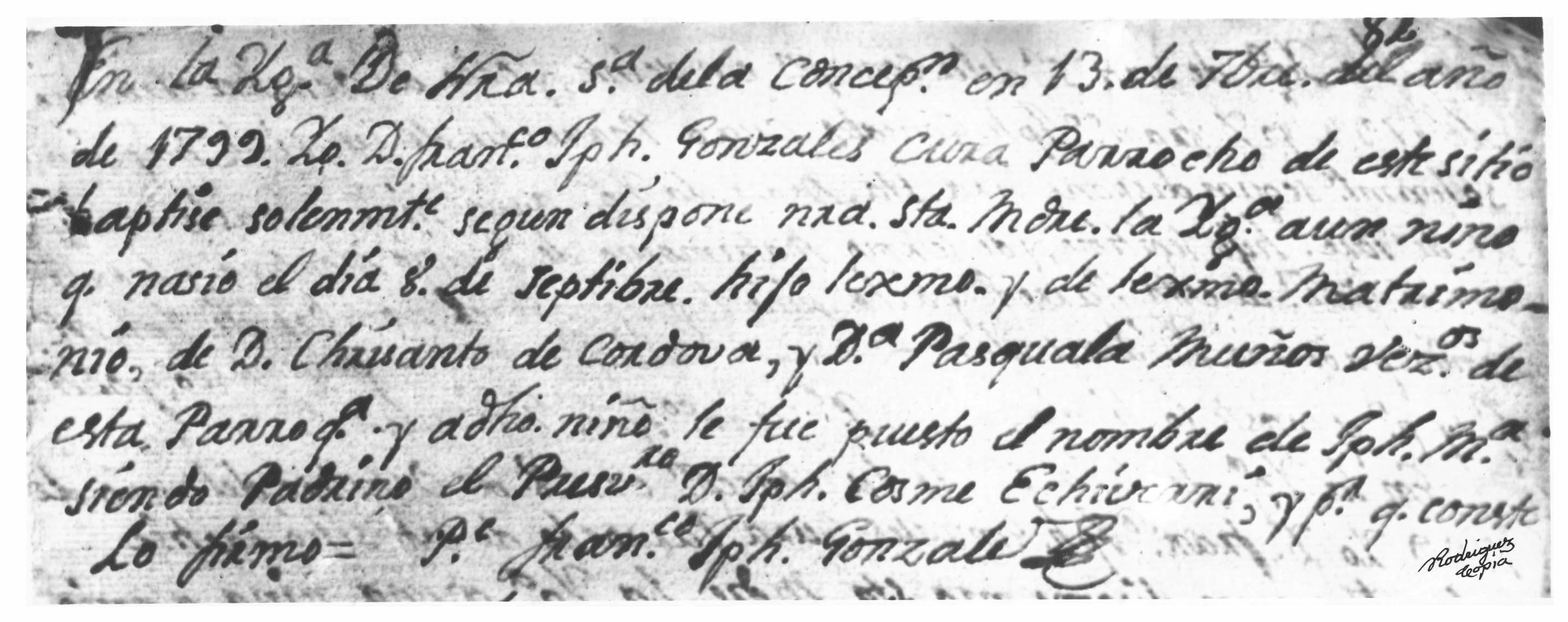
Baptism of José María Córdova

Córdova was born in Concepción, Antioquia on September 8, 1799. The son of Crisanto de Córdova y Mesa, a small merchant active in the east of Antioquia who had also been pedáneo mayor, and Pascuala Muñoz Castrillón, the couple had four other children: Salvador, Vicente, Venancia and Mercedes. Subsequently, his family moved to San Vicente and, later, to Rionegro. Córdova in his childhood only had the basic education of the time and that of accompanying his father on business trips.

== Military career ==
Córdova's military career began in 1814, when he joined the newly formed Engineer Corps in the province of Antioquia, which had just been established by Colonel Francisco José de Caldas in Medellín. Cordova's interest in the military and the revolutionary cause had been stoked by the Colombian declaration of independence, as well as Antioquia's own declaration of independence as the "Republic of Antioquia" or the "Free and Sovereign State of Antioquia" that joined in a federation in 1812 with other provinces of New Granada to form the United Provinces of New Granada. On June 6, 1814 he was accepted into the military school as a cadet that Colonel Caldas had created along with nine other cadets.

At the short lived military school one of his instructors was a French cavalry officer Emanuel Roergas Serviez, a veteran of the Napoleonic wars and now an officer in the Army of the Union (the army of the United Provinces of New Granada, also referred to as the patriot army). Serviez soon became his mentor. In early 1815 Serviez now a Colonel, was ordered by the federal congress to bring reinforcements to the Cauca province to assist Brigadier General José María Cabal's army of the south in their defense of the Cauca Valley from a renewed Spanish offensive. Serviez then took the Conscripts of Antioquia infantry battalion and marched south to assist General Cabal, in this battalion was a young second lieutenant Córdova who Serviez had also made him his aide-de-camp.

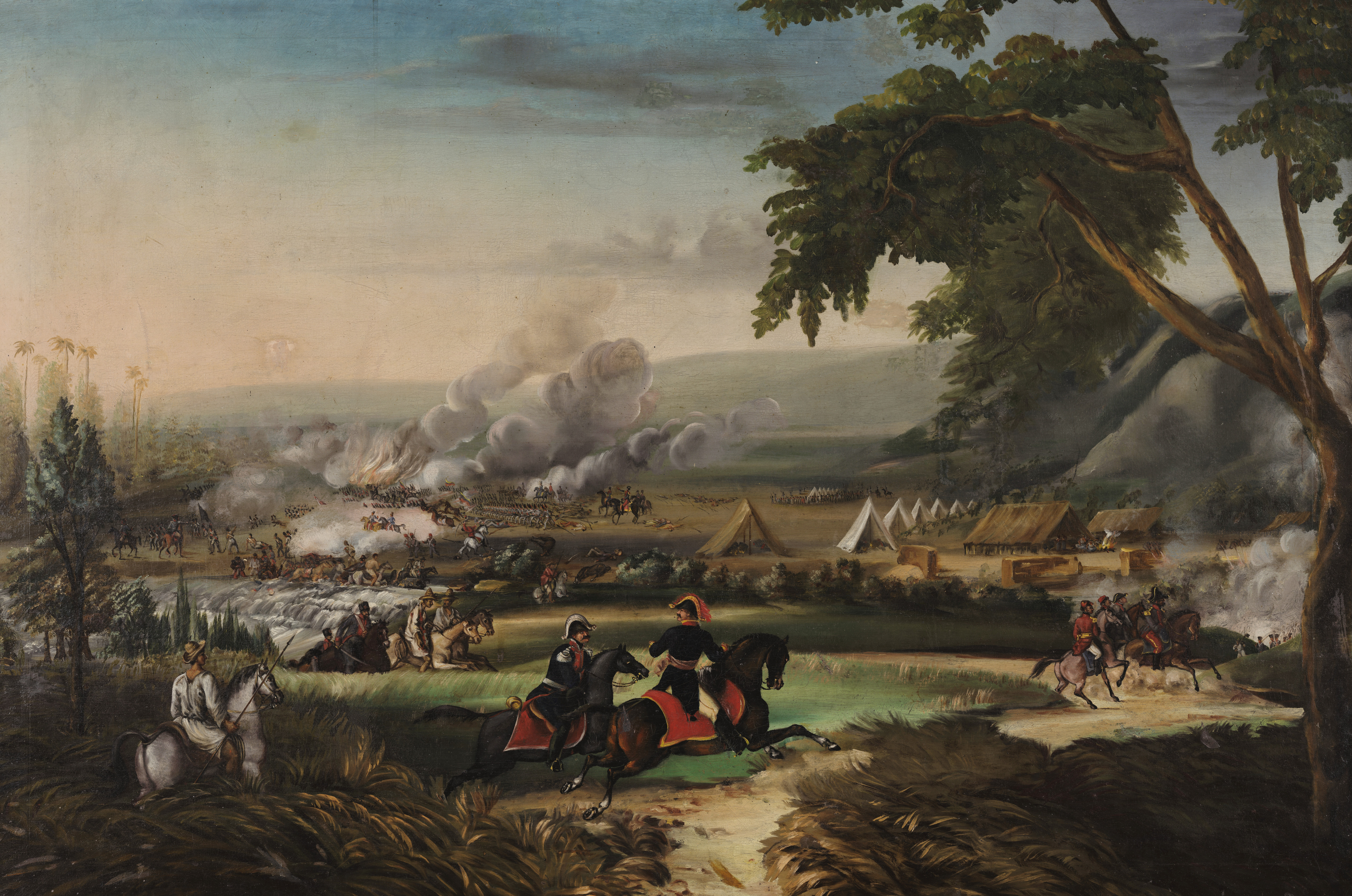
The Battle of the Palo River by José María Espinosa, this battle would be Cordova's baptism of fire in which his battalion acted valiantly.

On July 5, 1815, at the Battle of the Palo River Córdova's battalion was placed on the right flank of the patriot army. During the battle Córdova's battalion took part in the bayonet charge against the Spanish troops and received a bullet through his hat which knocked him down and led him to being erroneously labeled as dead in General Cabal's report of the battle to the congress. The battle was a decisive patriot victory and allowed the patriots to recapture the city of Popayán later that month. After a brief recovery, for his actions during the battle Córdova was promoted to the rank of Lieutenant, at the time of his promotion he was only 16 years old. He remained garrisoned in Popayán for the next three months.

Once the counter offensive by the Spanish troops began in 1815, Serviez was appointed as commander in chief of the Army, while Córdova continued to serve him as his aide. By early 1816, after taking command of the forces that had been defeated by the Spanish at the Battle of Cachirí back in February 1816 and with only a limited number of troops, Serviez knew it would pointless to mount a defense of the capital Santafe and made the decision to retreat with what was left of the army to Casanare Province in the Llanos Orientales. Along with Córdova, other important officers also joined them in their retreat such as Colonel Francisco de Paula Santander, Antonio Morales, Tomas Mantilla, and Jose Maria Vergara.

=== Campaign in the Llanos ===
During their retreat, the Patriot army was chased after by Brigadier Miguel de la Torres's troops up until the town of Pore where they managed to shake off their enemy. On July 1, 1816 the beleaguered patriot forces reached the town of Chire where they met up with the Venezuelan troops of GeneralRafael Urdaneta. There they joined forces with the Venezuelan patriots, forming a combined army to face the Spanish. This army eventually came under the command of Lt. Colonel Jose Antonio Páez, a native of the llanos known of for his tenacity and the respect he commanded amongst the Venezuelan llanero cavalry. Páez assumed command of the army after Santander, who had been originally picked to be commander, was faced with insubordination by the Venezuelan troops who clamored for Páez to be commander.

After assuming command, Páez immediately went on the offensive to attack the Spanish troops that had ventured into the llanos. He divided his troops into three columns of cavalry with Santander, Serviez, and Urdaneta as commanders of the columns. Cordova remained by Serviez's side and took part in the Battle of El Yagual on October 9, 1816, the Patriot victory allowing the combined Neogranadine and Venezuelan army to take control of the town of Achaguas. Despite this victory there remained a tension between Páez and the Neogranadine officers.

Shortly after the battle, General Serviez was assassinated in suspicious circumstances, presumably under orders from José Antonio Páez. The death of Serviez was a large blow to Córdova, who placed the blame on Paéz and would forever hold a grudge against him expressing this years later in a letter written to Santander in 1826 when Páez led an insurrection against Gran Colombia expressing his views on the Lion of Apure by saying

"What good can come from the man who ordered the assassination of General Serviez, the one who disobeyed the Liberator repeatedly in campaigns of 18' and 19'"

Fed up with Paéz, Córdova requested a passport to travel to Guyana where General Simon Bolívar had his army. However Paéz refused to authorize his leaving, leading Córdova to desert and head for Guyana, however Córdova was arrested by Paez's troops and taken to his headquarters. There Páez court martialed him for desertion, which carried the penalty of death. Córdova narrowly avoided execution, thanks to the intervention of another officer, Pedro Camejo, and was subsequently restored to his rank. Córdova remained in Paez's army and fought valiantly in the bloody Battle of Mucuritas on April 28, 1817. After the victory Córdova insisted on being allowed to march to Guyana which he was finally allowed to do, reaching there by way of the Orinoco River where he met Simon Bolivar for the first time where Bolivar subsequently incorporated him into his general staff. On November 14, 1817 in Angostura, he was promoted to the rank of captain.

Córdova then took part in the Guyana Campaign and Center Campaign where Bolívar's Patriot army was defeated by General Pablo Morillo's forces near the outskirts of Caracas leading to the end of the campaign and forcing Bolivar to retreat with his tattered army back to Angostura.

=== New Granada Campaign of 1819 ===
After the failure of the Center Campaign, Bolivar began to replan his strategy and opted for a possible campaign to invade and liberate New Granada which had been under firm control of the Spanish since the reconquest of 1816. However the army was devastated after the Center Campaign, so new troops would need to be raised. Thus in August 1818, Bolivar promoted Colonel Santander to brigadier general and made him commander of the Vanguard Division of the Liberator Army dispatching him with some officers to the llanos of Casanare in New Granada with a number of rifles and supplies with the goal of raising troops for the upcoming campaign. After many months of preparation, Bolivar decided to begin the campaign on May 23, 1819 marching from Venezuela to join with Santander's army in Casanare. Córdova who had been promoted from captain to lieutenant colonel on February 14, 1819, would take part in the campaign as divisional chief of staff of Brigadier General Jose Antonio Anzoátegui's Rearguard Division. Taking part in the difficult marches across the flooded llanos and the grueling crossing of the eastern Andes through the Páramo de Pisbá. Córdova saw action at the Battle of Gámeza on July 11 and at the bloody battle of Vargas Swamp on July 25, 1819 where the Patriots snatched a victory from the Spanish at the very last moment. 13 days later the campaign concluded with a decisive Patriot victory at the Battle of Boyacá, on August 7, 1819, with the Patriot army entering the viceregal capital of Santa Fe triumphantly on August 11.

With the victory at Boyacá most of central New Granada was liberated of Spanish control. Shortly after their entrance in Santa Fe. Upon arriving to Santa Fe, Córdova had been ordered to chase after Viceroy Juan de Sámano who had fled the day before for the river port of Honda on the Magdalena River with goal of reaching of Cartagena de Indias. While at Honda, on August 13 Córdova was given the order of liberating his home province of Antioquia and was given 50 men to complete this task. At the age of 19, this expedition would be Córdova's first independent command. After recruiting more troops he embarked on his mission on August 22 with 190 soldiers, arriving in Rionegro on August 25 and in Medellín on August 30.

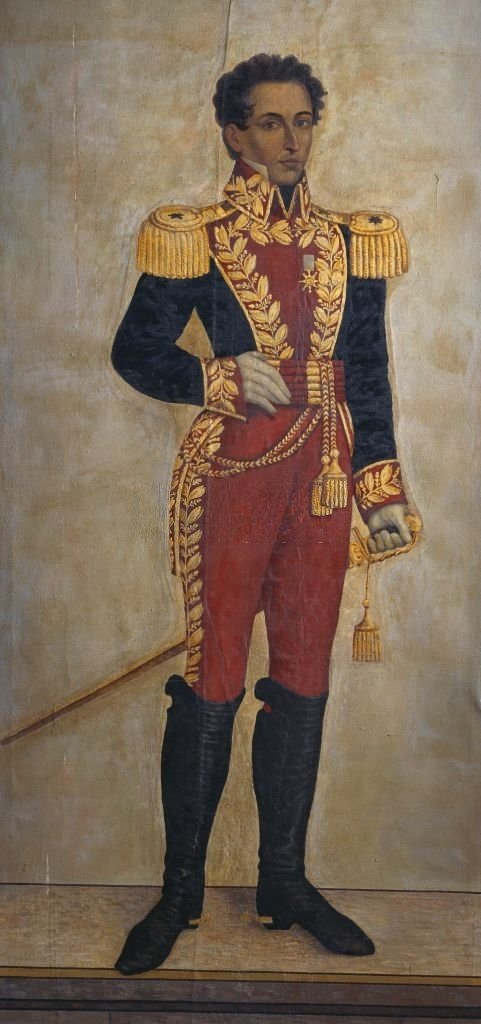
Full length portrait of Córdova in full dress uniform in 1828, painted by Antonio Salas Avilés

Once there, Córdova became the Military Chief of Antioquia, while José Manuel Restrepo was named as the Civilian Chief in charge of the public administration. Córdova organized a small army of 700 volunteers, and on February 12, 1820, he defeated the Spanish army of Colonel Francisco Warleta at the “Battle of Chorros Blancos”, in Yarumal, Antioquia. This victory marked the end of the presence of Spanish troops in Antioquia.

Having completed his mission in Antioquia, Córdova then took part in the Battle for Cartagena in 1821, commanding his own Antioquia Battalion.

=== Southern Campaign ===
With the liberation of Cartagena in late 1821, Córdova's performance had been noted by Bolívar who ordered that he take his veteran troops to the Quito Province in the south to assist General Antonio José de Surce who had departed the year before to liberate the province from Spanish control. On January 17, 1822 Colonel Córdova along with 800 veteran troops of the Bajo Magdalena campaign departed Cartagena for Panama and after crossing the isthmus continued their journey to Guayaquil. Accompanying him were Colonel Maza and Daniel Florence O'Leary. By the time Cordova had reached Guayaquil, Sucre had already begun his campaign against the Spanish, leading to a confusing political situation as the Colombian troops found themselves unable to disembark in the port as situation of infighting between the patriots of Guayaquil who were fighting amongst themselves over whether to join Colombia or seek an autonomous path to independence. Thus the Colombian troops were forced to sail south to disembark at the port of Machala. There the troops began their difficult march to meet up with general Sucre’s troops, in which they were plagued by disease with even Córdova at one point falling ill as well. The Alto Magdalena battalion suffered heavily and was left with only 190 troops, and only 160 survived by the time they finally reached Sucre at Latacunga. With the arrival of these forces on May 13, 1822, Sucre began the second phase of his advance on Quito. The commander of the Royalist army of Quito Melchor Aymerich positioned his forces south of Quito to defend the city. The Colombian troops and their allies had around 3,141 troops and faced off against the Royalist’s 2,194 troops. On May 24, 1822 at 10:30 am combat began between the two forces. Córdova commanded the Magdalena battalion who at the start of the battle tried flank the enemy’s right, but due to the heavy fire they received and the favorable ground that the royalists had occupied, they were forced to abandon this attempt and withdrew back to the main line and were placed in the reserve.

As the battle continued the republican troops were unable to break the royalist line as they employed their superior firepower to keep them at bay. Sucre deployed his battalions one after the other in an attempt to break their lines to no avail, with his reserves almost depleted Sucre once again deployed Cordova and the Magdalena battalion and ordered them to charge against the enemy. The charge was brilliant, but the royalists fought with such gallantry that for a moment it seemed unsuccessful. Nevertheless, Córdova carried on with great daring and pushed forward and at noon the triumph was certain. With Cordova’s valiant charge more units entered in to assist him and were able to break the Spanish line. The royalists retreated and Cordova was ordered to chase after them, Aymerich surrendered shortly after and Quito fell under republican control. The next day Cordova was able make the Cataluña battalion surrender as well, as they had come marching south from Pasto to assist Aymerich and were unaware of his defeat.

After Quito was liberated and with the arrival of Bolivar who had managed to defeat the Royalists at the Battle of Bomboná thus liberating Pasto, the Colombian army continued their march and entered Guayaquil triumphantly on July 11.

On January 14, 1823, Cordova was promoted to the rank of brigadier general.

=== Battle of Ayacucho ===
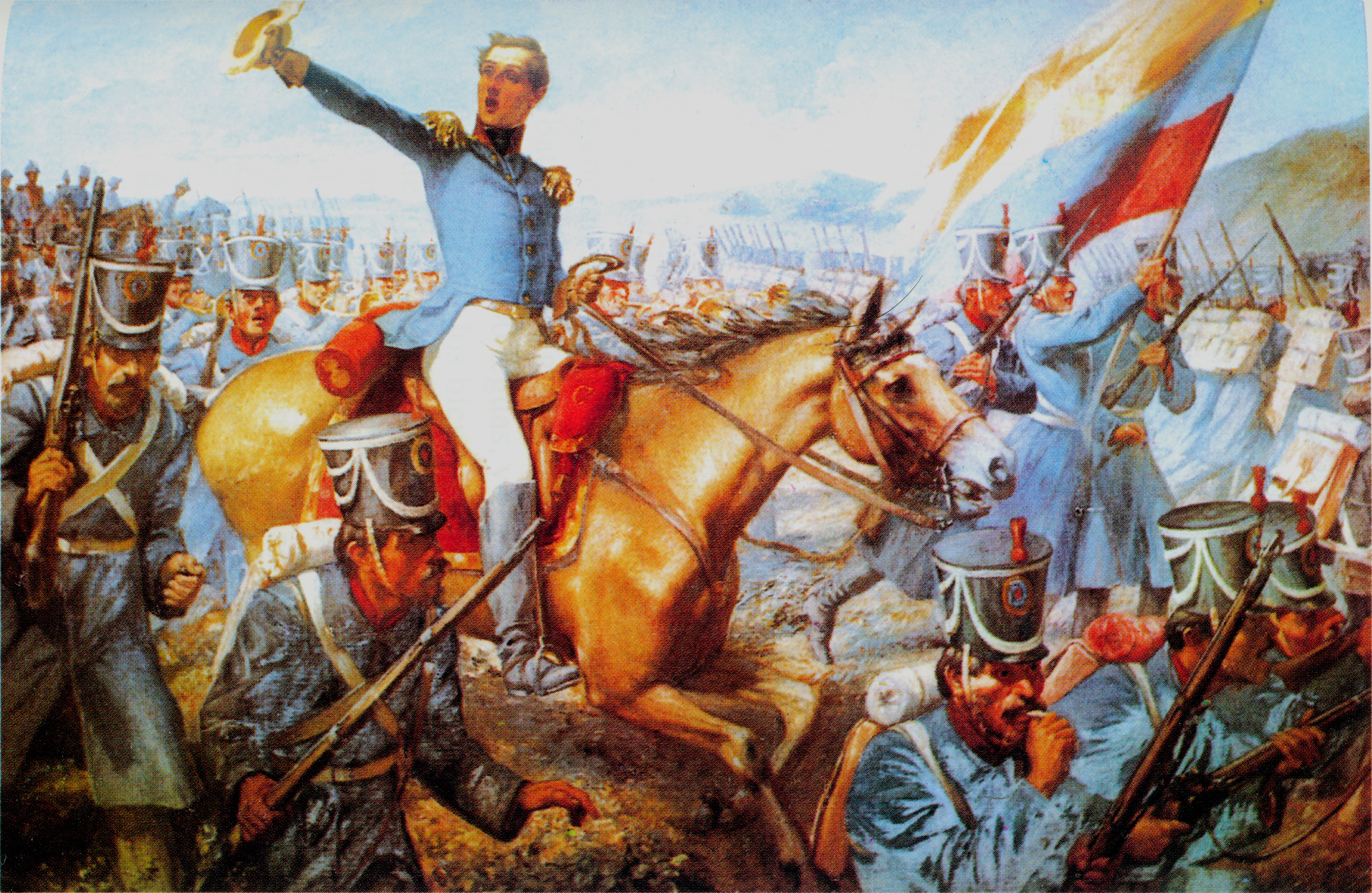
Córdova leading the Gran Colombian army at the Battle of Ayacucho on December 9, 1824, painting by Francisco Antonio Cano, 1916.

In 1824, having already been promoted to Brigadier General, Córdova was sent to Peru to join with General Antonio José de Sucre, to defeat royalist forces under the Viceroy José de la Serna. Córdova was given the command of a Division, known as the 2nd Colombian Division composed of 4 line infantry battalions these being: Bogotá, Voltígeros, Pichincha and Caracas line battalions with the Caracas Battalion being held in the reserve behind the 3 main ones, totaling around 2,300 troops. Cordova’s division was placed on the right flank of the republican effort. Facing him in the opposite side was the Spanish Villalobos Division under the direct command of the Viceroy of Peru José de la Serna along with 7 Spanish artillery pieces. The Spanish army of Peru outnumbered the allied aprecian and Colombian army and also had 14 artillery pieces compared to the singular piece the republicans had.

Prior to the commencement of the battle on December 9, 1824, at 9am Spanish General Monet with his general staff rode out from his lines under a flag of truce requesting to speak with Cordova. There the two conversed for a few minutes, with Monet offering a last chance at a truce between the two sides, this was offered by the other Spanish officers to their republican counterparts as well. However this was rejected, thus the Spanish and their republican opposites embraced themselves momentarily as a sign of respect between the two sides. Prior to returning to their lines Cordova is obsessed to have said to his Spanish counterpart

“Surely you have more troops and are in a better position compared to us, but your soldiers cannot be compared to ours.”

The officers returned to their lines, General Sucre commander in chief of the allied army rode out in front of the army and riled up the troops. Sometime after Monet descended from his position again and announced that “The battle will commence”.

At 10am the battle began with the royalist forces deploying their right flank and attacking Peruvian General de la Mar’s division as well as General Sucre’s division that were positioned in the center and left flank of the republican effort successfully. Seeing this success the royalist infantry battalion I del Primero acted prematurely against their orders and attacked Cordova’s second Colombian division alone without the rest of the Villalobos deploying and without the Spanish cannons having been completely deployed on the left. Seeing this Cordova took advantage of the mistake by deploying the Bogota, Pichincha, and Voltigeros battalions against the lone battalion with great success.

While the royalists achieve great success against the republican left and center flank the disorganized attack on Cordova’s division and the defeat of the 2 battalions of the Villalobos division had caused a gap which Viceroy La Serna attempted to remediate this by deploying the Gerona battalion. However in order to buy some time for this battalion to come up from the reserve, La Serna ordered the Monet Division in the royalist center who deployed the Burgos and I de Infante battalions to attack Cordova. As they advanced to face the 2nd Colombian division they were forced to cross a ravine, which caused the royalist battalions to disperse out of their formation in order to cross. This created another opportunity for the republicans to strike a new blow. Córdova dismounted from his horse and put himself in front of his entire division, Voltígeros, Pichincha and Bogotá battalions, in addition to Caracas, which until then had not fought. The 25 year old brigadier general ordered them to attack Monet’s division, shouting his famous order: "Division, armas a discreción, de frente, paso de vencedores!" (Division, arms at ease; at the pace of victors, forward!) The war band of the Voltigeros battalion then began playing the national bambuco La Guaneña as the 2nd division went on the attack shouting their battle cry of “Long live Liberty" and “Long live El Libertador”. The Colombian troops advanced and clashed first with the Burgos battalion, who was still not in order, defeating them completely. They then clashed with the I de Infante also defeating them . The 2nd Colombian division continued their irresistible advance, falling on the Viciosa and the II of First battalions- the second brigade of the division - which were also beaten. The attack of Cordova’s division completely defeated the Monet Division whose own commander was later killed in the battle along with three corps leaders. The only battalion that survived the onslaught, Guías, worn out by the guerrilla combat and by the attacks of the cavalry, is also put out of combat.

The utter defeat of the royalist center changed the battle and shifted it in favor of the republicans who are able to defeat the last desperate attempts by La Serna who even led a cavalry charge himself in an attempt to change the course of the battle. The republicans had triumphed and after lengthy negotiations, the next day on the morning of December 10 the royalists surrendered to General Sucre, the battle marked virtual the end of the Spanish Empire in South America save for a few isolated garrisons. Cordova’s actions had been vital to the republican success, at the end of the battle Sucre in recognition of Cordova’s bravery promoted him on the battlefield to the rank of General of Division, with Sucre removing his own epaulettes and placing them on Cordova's shoulders. Córdova was also given the nickname "The Hero of Ayacucho" as well as "The Lion of Ayacucho". This victory confirmed Peruvian Independence, and led to the recognition of the independence of the South American states by England, France and the United States of America. Córdova continued south into Bolivia, and commanded the newly formed armed forces in the country during the formation of the government, and remained through 1827.

== Death ==
Córdova returned to Antioquia after the military campaign to liberate Peru on September 8, 1829. He had clearly expressed his opposition and discontent with General Simón Bolívar proclamation as Dictator of Colombia and he was under investigation for the conspiracy of the "Noche Septembrina" of September 25, 1828. His discontentment with Bolivar's actions, led Córdova to organize a revolt against Bolívar in Antioquia.

In response to Cordova's rebellion, Irish General Daniel Florence O'Leary was commissioned by Bolivar to render Cordova. The ensuing battle took place near El Santuario, Antioquia, where Córdova was killed by the Irish Commander Rupert Hand on 17 October 1829.

As homage for his actions and in his memory the department of Córdova in Colombia, the Colombian army's military officer's academy and the Medellin International Airport in Rionegro are all named after him.
