= Rionegro =

City in Antioquia, Department of Colombia

Rionegro Santiago de Arma de Rionegro
- Municipality and city
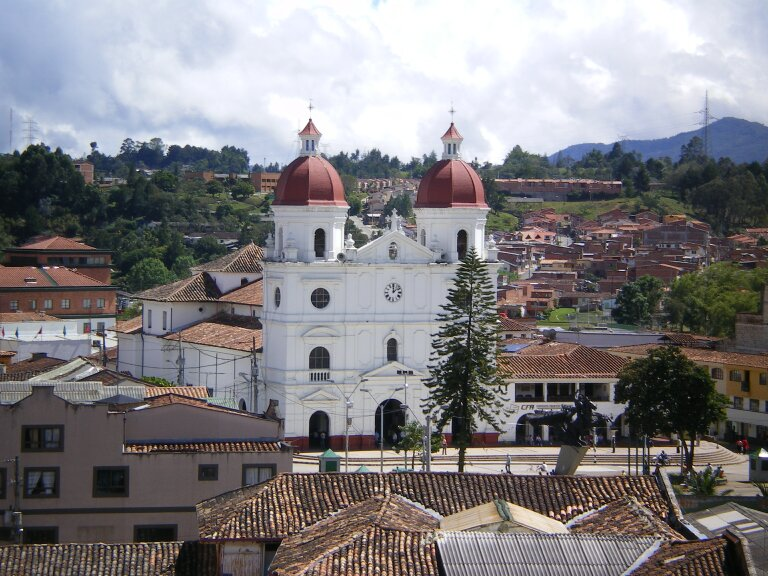
- Catedral de San Nicolás el Magno

- Flag Coat of arms
- Motto: Cuna de la democracia (Cradle of Democracy)
- Location of the city (Marked in red) in the Antioquia region of Colombia

- Location in Colombia
- Coordinates: 6°9′18″N 75°23′20″W
- Country: Colombia
- Departamento: Antioquia Department
- Subregion: Eastern
- Founded: 1541

Government
  - Mayor: Jorge Humberto Rivas Urrea.

Area
  - Municipality and city: 195.9 km^{2} (75.6 sq mi)
  - Urban: 9.5 km^{2} (3.7 sq mi)
- Elevation: 2,125 m (6,972 ft)

Population (2020 est.)
  - Municipality and city: 142,995
  - Density: 729.9/km^{2} (1,891/sq mi)
  - Urban: 90,256
  - Urban density: 9,500/km^{2} (25,000/sq mi)
- Demonym: Rionegrero
- Area code: 57 + 4
- Website: www.rionegro.gov.co

Rionegro (Spanish pronunciation: [rioˈneɣɾo]) is a city and municipality in Antioquia Department, Colombia, located in the subregion of Eastern Antioquia. The official name of the city is Ciudad Santiago de Arma de Rionegro. Rio Negro means "Black River" in Spanish, as the city received its name after a river that looks black because of the shadows cast by trees. The river traverses the city and it is the most prominent geographical feature of the municipality. Rionegro is also sometimes called the Cuna de la democracia (Cradle of democracy) as it was one of the most important cities during the era of the Colombia's struggle for independence and the 1863 constitution was written in the city.

== History ==
The territory was first mentioned in 1541 by the Spanish Lieutenant Álvaro de Mendoza. When the Field Marshal Jorge Robledo took possession of the Valley of Aburrá, he was commissioned by Álvaro de Mendoza. According to Fray Pedro Simón, Robledo was the first Iberian man who discovered the Valley of San Nicolás on 2 September 1541.

Don Juan Daza, a Spaniard of illustrious lineage, took possession of the lands sometime later, and on 8 November 1581, in agreement with the rituals of the laws of Indias, nailed his sword in the ground marking it as an inhabited place and began constructing a farm.

Immigration to Rionegro came from numerous regions of the country, including from the same provincial capital of the time, Santa Fe de Antioquia and the original ranch grew into a village and then a town in the first half of the 17th century. The chapel, Concatedral de San Nicolás el Magno, consecrated to Saint Nicholas was built as early as 1642, another reason why the territory reached a greater degree of independence for religious reasons. Yet, for most part of the 18th century, Rionegro was isolated by the jungle and mountains, and its chapel being only a humble one made of straw and bahareque. In 1783, Rionegro had enough population to become like a municipality, resulting in becoming the City of Santiago de Arma de Rionegro in 1786, with administrative powers under certification of King Carlos III, issued in the Palace of San Idelfonso on 25 September 1786. After this event, its isolation decreased, resulting in the visit of the bishop of Popayán in 1793. After seeing the bad state and rusticity of the chapel, the bishop ordered it to be demolished and a new one was built, its inauguration taking place in 1803. Rionegro became an important town, and a new distribution of lands was made (resulting in the colonization of the south of the region).

Rionegro grew in the 19th century and was an important center during the end of the Spanish rule, and in the early years of Independence. The city then rivaled Santa Fe de Antioquia to compete for the capital of Antioquia, until the city of Medellín grew prominently and far exceeded the growth of these cities.

== Geography and climate ==
The municipality of Rionegro is located in the central mountain range of the Andes in eastern Antioquia. With a total area of 196 km^{2}, is part of the sub-region of Eastern Antioquia. The city is surrounded in the north by the municipalities of Guarne and San Vicente, in the east by the municipalities of Marinilla and El Carmen de Viboral, in the south by the municipality of La Ceja, and in the west by the municipalities of El Retiro and Medellín.

The city of Rionegro is located at 6°9′18″N 75°22′48″W, at an average elevation of 2,125 metres (6,972 ft) above sea level. The average annual precipitation varies between 1,800 and 2,500 millimetres (71 and 98 in) with an average temperature of 17 °C or 62.6 °F. Much of the land consists of volcanic ashes and soils with a high resistance to erosion.

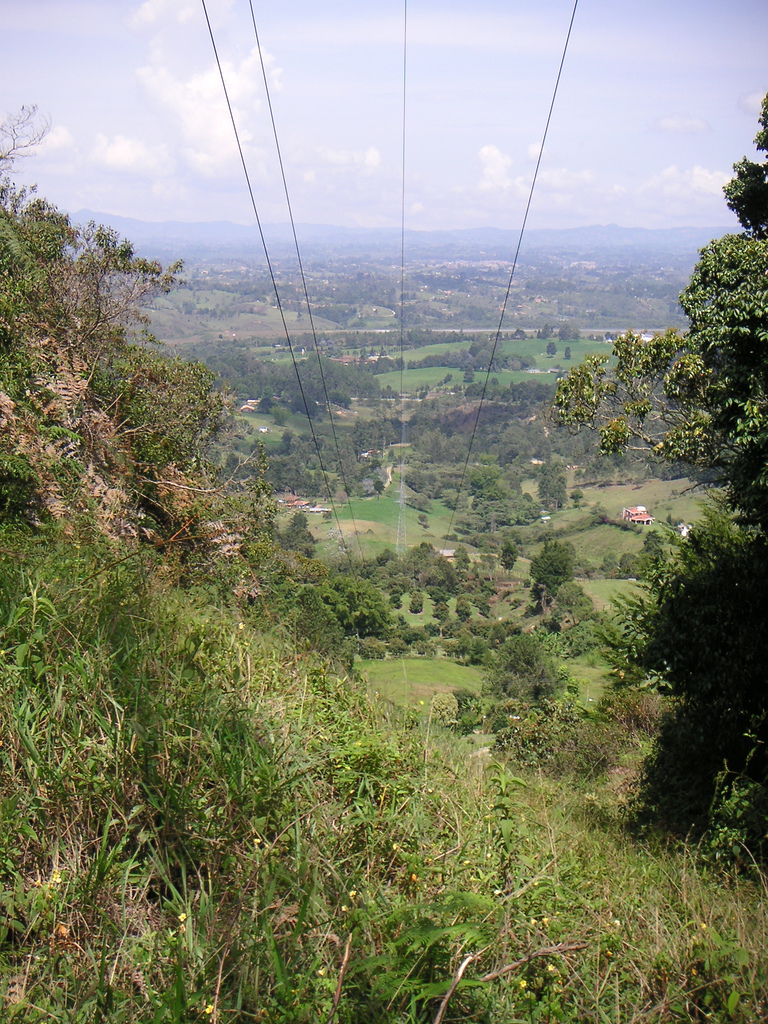
Rural Rionegro

The altitude of the rest of the territory varies between 2,100 and 2,600 metres (6,890 and 8,530 ft), and the topography is characterised by a number of small hills, some of which may rise to a greater height and slope like Cerro del Capiro, located in limits with the municipality of La Ceja. A sharper mountainous system emerges towards the West of the municipality, which becomes a physical barrier between the Valley of the Aburrá and the Plateau of Rionegro, from where the main affluents of the Negro River are born. The main hills of the mountainous chain that surround the Valley by Rionegro are: Alto Gordo, Alto de Amariles, Alto de Salazar o La Pilastra, Cerro Verde, Alto de Careperro, Alto de Pantanillo, Cerro Corcovado and Cerro del Capiro.

Part of the city is an alluvial plain of the Negro River and its tributaries, which also include the Pantanillo River and the gorges such as Las Palmas and Espíritu Santo y Fizebad. Historically the Negro River divided the valley in two, with the Valley of Llanogrande and the Valley of San Nicholas. Hydroelectric companies operate in the area, and have constructed a Hydroelectric Power station at Guatapé with the Santa Rita Dam. Today the hydroelectric complex of Eastern Antioquia consists of five power stations, two of which are public companies of Medellín city.

Climate data for Rionegro (José María Córdova International Airport), elevation 2,073 m (6,801 ft), (1981–2010)
| Month | Jan | Feb | Mar | Apr | May | Jun | Jul | Aug | Sep | Oct | Nov | Dec | Year |
|---|---|---|---|---|---|---|---|---|---|---|---|---|---|
| Mean daily maximum °C (°F) | 21.8 (71.2) | 22.2 (72.0) | 22.3 (72.1) | 22.2 (72.0) | 22.5 (72.5) | 22.5 (72.5) | 22.5 (72.5) | 22.6 (72.7) | 22.4 (72.3) | 21.8 (71.2) | 21.6 (70.9) | 21.7 (71.1) | 22.2 (72.0) |
| Daily mean °C (°F) | 16.7 (62.1) | 17.1 (62.8) | 17.1 (62.8) | 17.3 (63.1) | 17.4 (63.3) | 17.3 (63.1) | 17.3 (63.1) | 17.3 (63.1) | 17.1 (62.8) | 16.5 (61.7) | 16.5 (61.7) | 16.6 (61.9) | 17.0 (62.6) |
| Mean daily minimum °C (°F) | 12.4 (54.3) | 12.6 (54.7) | 12.7 (54.9) | 13.2 (55.8) | 13.1 (55.6) | 12.4 (54.3) | 11.7 (53.1) | 11.9 (53.4) | 12.3 (54.1) | 12.5 (54.5) | 12.7 (54.9) | 12.6 (54.7) | 12.5 (54.5) |
| Average precipitation mm (inches) | 64.6 (2.54) | 81.4 (3.20) | 134.5 (5.30) | 206.7 (8.14) | 246.7 (9.71) | 178.0 (7.01) | 153.6 (6.05) | 167.7 (6.60) | 204.2 (8.04) | 231.5 (9.11) | 190.3 (7.49) | 104.2 (4.10) | 1,963.5 (77.30) |
| Average precipitation days (≥ 1.0 mm) | 15 | 15 | 19 | 23 | 24 | 21 | 20 | 20 | 24 | 25 | 22 | 17 | 241 |
| Average relative humidity (%) | 80 | 80 | 80 | 82 | 81 | 78 | 76 | 76 | 78 | 82 | 83 | 82 | 80 |
| Mean monthly sunshine hours | 164.3 | 144.0 | 136.4 | 126.0 | 155.0 | 180.0 | 217.0 | 217.0 | 174.0 | 145.7 | 132.0 | 139.5 | 1,930.9 |
| Mean daily sunshine hours | 5.3 | 5.1 | 4.4 | 4.2 | 5.0 | 6.0 | 7.0 | 7.0 | 5.8 | 4.7 | 4.4 | 4.5 | 5.3 |
Source: Instituto de Hidrologia Meteorologia y Estudios Ambientales

Climate data for Rionegro (Selva La), elevation 2,090 m (6,860 ft), (1981–2010)
| Month | Jan | Feb | Mar | Apr | May | Jun | Jul | Aug | Sep | Oct | Nov | Dec | Year |
|---|---|---|---|---|---|---|---|---|---|---|---|---|---|
| Mean daily maximum °C (°F) | 22.3 (72.1) | 22.5 (72.5) | 22.8 (73.0) | 22.6 (72.7) | 22.8 (73.0) | 22.8 (73.0) | 22.9 (73.2) | 23.1 (73.6) | 22.8 (73.0) | 22.4 (72.3) | 22.1 (71.8) | 22.1 (71.8) | 22.6 (72.7) |
| Daily mean °C (°F) | 16.6 (61.9) | 16.8 (62.2) | 17.0 (62.6) | 17.1 (62.8) | 17.1 (62.8) | 17.0 (62.6) | 16.8 (62.2) | 16.9 (62.4) | 16.8 (62.2) | 16.5 (61.7) | 16.6 (61.9) | 16.6 (61.9) | 16.8 (62.2) |
| Mean daily minimum °C (°F) | 12.0 (53.6) | 12.2 (54.0) | 12.5 (54.5) | 13.0 (55.4) | 12.9 (55.2) | 12.0 (53.6) | 11.3 (52.3) | 11.4 (52.5) | 12.0 (53.6) | 12.4 (54.3) | 12.6 (54.7) | 12.3 (54.1) | 12.2 (54.0) |
| Average precipitation mm (inches) | 64.1 (2.52) | 86.8 (3.42) | 131.7 (5.19) | 199.8 (7.87) | 247.6 (9.75) | 187.4 (7.38) | 169.4 (6.67) | 180.2 (7.09) | 212.3 (8.36) | 225.2 (8.87) | 183.8 (7.24) | 98.8 (3.89) | 1,987.1 (78.23) |
| Average precipitation days (≥ 1.0 mm) | 14 | 16 | 19 | 21 | 24 | 20 | 19 | 20 | 23 | 24 | 21 | 16 | 237 |
| Average relative humidity (%) | 80 | 80 | 80 | 81 | 81 | 79 | 78 | 78 | 79 | 81 | 81 | 81 | 80 |
| Mean monthly sunshine hours | 158.1 | 138.3 | 130.2 | 114.0 | 139.5 | 168.0 | 204.6 | 195.3 | 153.0 | 120.9 | 120.0 | 142.6 | 1,784.5 |
| Mean daily sunshine hours | 5.1 | 4.9 | 4.2 | 3.8 | 4.5 | 5.6 | 6.6 | 6.3 | 5.1 | 3.9 | 4.0 | 4.6 | 4.9 |
Source: Instituto de Hidrologia Meteorologia y Estudios Ambientales

== Demographics ==
According to the figures presented by the National Administrative Department of Statistics (DANE) in the 2005 census, the municipality of Rionegro had a total population of 101,046 inhabitants, the sixth largest populated area in Antioquia.

The municipality had a population density of approximately 466 inhabitants per square kilometer. The ethnicity of the population is almost entirely of Mestizo and White persons (98.9%) with 1.1% Afro Colombian. 48.6% of the population are men and 51.4% women and city had a rate of 5.7% who were illiterate, but most of these were under 5 years of age and not yet eligible or mature enough for an education. Public services in Rionegro are of a relatively high standard with 98.7% of houses supplied with electricity, 95.6% with a water supply and 87.1% with a telephone connection.

In 2020, the population of the city and the municipality was estimated to be 142,995.

=== Ethnicity ===
According to DANE statistics 2005, the ethnic composition of this city is:

- Whites and Mestizos (98.5%)
- Black (1.1%)

== Administration ==
Rionegro is governed by a democratic system based on the processes of administrative decentralization generated by the proclamation of Political constitution of Colombia in 1991. For the city there is a mayor with executive authority and a Municipal Council with legislative rights. The Mayor of Rionegro is naturally the head of the local government and the municipal administration, representing legal, judicial authority in the municipality. The position of mayor is chosen by popular vote for a period of four years, that at present is a position held by Hernan Ospina with Andres Julian Rendón as elected major for the term 2016–2019. Amongst his main functions are the administration of the resources of the municipality including responsibility of health, housing, education and road infrastructure, to guard the well-being and respond to the interests of his fellow citizens and to represent them before the National Government, besides being impelled to implement local policies to improve quality of life within the municipality.

The Municipal council of Rionegro, is also subject to election, composed by 17 politicians of varying political parties, chosen for a period of four years. The council is the associated executive organization of the municipality with obligation to take responsibility for Rionegro's territorial jurisdiction. Amongst its functions are approving the proposals and projects of the mayor, and with financial obligation to draw up the budget and to take responsibility of collecting rents and taxes. Administratively the Mayorship of Rionegro is divided in two main groups, the chief central administration and the decentralized organizations. These organizations are denominated Secretaries, whose main objective is the benefit of services to the community.

== Economy ==
From many years ago, Rionegro has become the most important trade center in eastern Antioquia, due to its strategic position in the subregion. The city's dramatic growth has situated it as one of the richest cities in Colombia; its economy is mainly based on industries of all kinds, food industries, fabric industries, paper industries, chemical industries, and trade which brings Rionegro's people one of the highest standards of living in the country. Agriculture also plays an important role in the local economy; the main agricultural activities are floriculture and poultry production.

== Transport ==
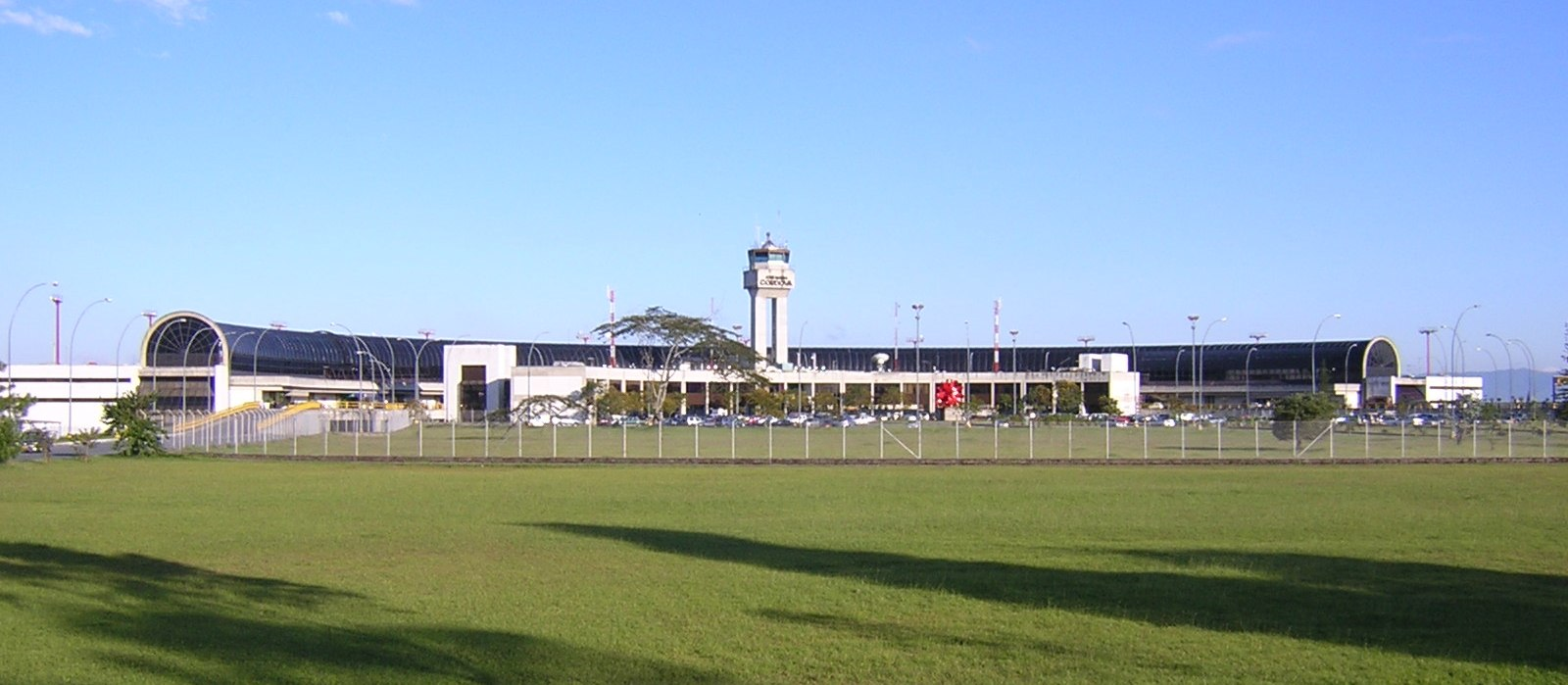
José María Córdova International Airport

Rionegro has private shuttles that serve all the city's neighborhoods and bus routes throughout the city which connect it to Medellín and the other surrounding municipalities. Taxis are also well used in the urban area. Located within Rionegro city is José María Córdova International Airport, the second most important airport in Colombia, which serves Medellín. Both domestic and international flights arrive and depart from this airport.

== Sites of interest ==
- Concatedral de San Nicolás el Magno -built in the 1790s and opened in 1804.
- Parque principal La Libertad
- Museo de Arte Religioso
- Calle de la Madera
- Tutucán
- Parque Los Osos Comfama de Rionegro
- Casa de La Convención

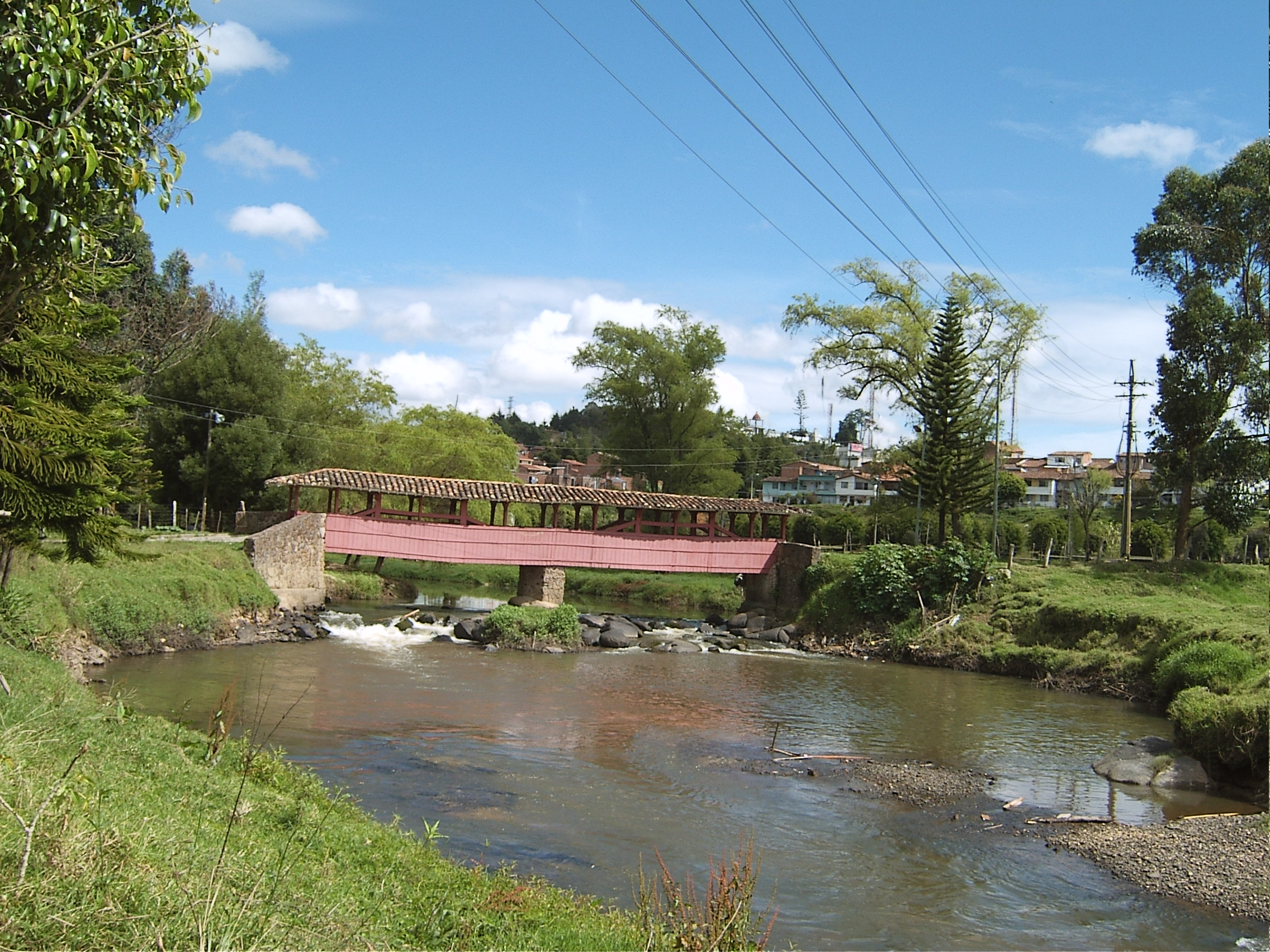
Puente Mejia

- Puente Mejía
- Palacio de la Cultura Ricardo Rendón
- Corregimiento San Antonio de Pereira
- Casa de La Maestranza
- Parque de San Antonio de Pereira
- Iglesia de San Antonio de Pereira
- Antiguo Colegio de Rionegro
- Iglesia de San Francisco
- Iglesia de Jesus Nazareno
- Archivo Historico de Rionegro
- Estatua Ecuestre del General José María Cordova
- Cementerio Principal

== Religion ==
- Roman Catholic Diocese of Sonsón–Rionegro

== Sports ==
The city is home to Categoría Primera A football club Águilas Doradas since March 2015. They play their home games at the Estadio Alberto Grisales.

== Education ==
Universidad Católica de Oriente is in Rionegro, as well as a small branch of the University of Antioquia.

== Notable people ==
- Pablo Escobar, one of the most powerful drug lords of all time, one of the founders of the Medellín Cartel
- Roberto Escobar, older brother of Pablo Escobar and former high-ranking member of Medellín Cartel
- Iván Córdoba, footballer

== Sister Cities ==
Rionegro's sister cities are:

- Biloxi, Mississippi, United States
- Gulfport, Mississippi, United States
