= La Montaña Gris =

Colombian folk music group

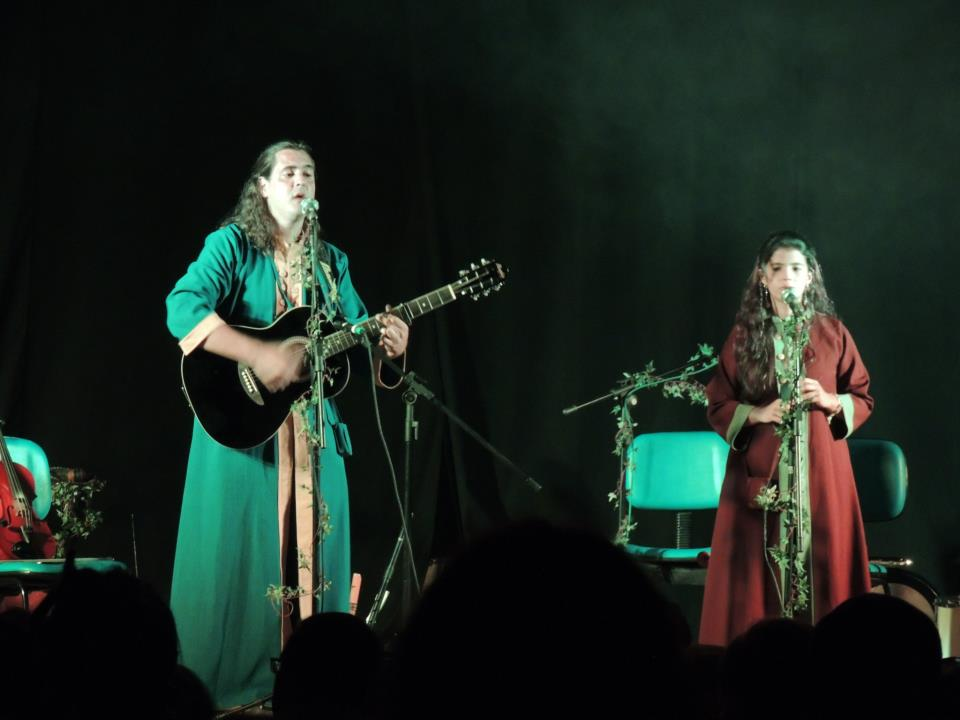
- La Montaña Gris during a concert in 2013

Background information
- Origin: Medellín, Colombia
- Genres: Folk music, Celtic music
- Years active: 2001–present
- Members: Pablo Villegas; Sara Zapata; Daniel Montoya; Diego Gómez; Fernando Ospina; Juan David Estrada; Luisa García
- Website: www.celtagris.com

La Montaña Gris ("The Gray Mountain" in Spanish) is a Colombian group of folk and Celtic music, which had its first appearances during 2001 in the city of Medellín.

== Origins ==
The group was created on August 18, 2001 in Medellín, Colombia. In its beginnings it has been characterized by the diffusion of the folklore from Northern Europe, commonly known as Celtic music. Its members consider Celtic music as one of the folklore that allowed the development of music in the West and the Americas. They also consider that this folklore is an ancient legacy, the elves, fairies and all those magic creatures that we know as representatives of fantasy, left to feed the happiness of humans. Celtic music provokes, in its listeners, the sensation of the mythical and opens the doors of the imagination.

== Consolidation ==
In the course of its work, the group has performed a great number of concerts, creating a new musical proposal desired in theaters, universities, cultural centers, tourist centers, parks, schools, bars, cafes, marriages and parties among others. Their first album "Canto Primio", put together their best songs, sung in English, Spanish, and "Lengua Primia", a language created by the group. Between October and December 2004, they did their first tour of South America that encompassed Chile, Argentina, Brazil and Ecuador, performing various concerts in festivals and international meetings that allowed La Montaña Gris to achieve an important recognition in the midst of Celtic Music in Latin America. Between September and December 2006, they toured South America again, performing 30 concerts in Ecuador, Chile, Brazil and Bolivia. Presenting their new album "En el regazo de la caramañola". This album conceives life as a journey, and develops music dedicated to travel and travelers in Primia language, English, Italian, French and Spanish. During the trip they made a DVD documentary video entitled "Tras los vestigios del fuego" (Behind the vestiges of fire). Between September and November 2008, they toured Brazil with 20 concerts in São Paulo, Campo Grande, Curitiba and Florianópolis. In the year 2010 they recorded a third album titled "Alboroque Irlandés", in which they make a trip for the music of Irish tavern. This album was made with the participation of musicians from different places in Brazil

In 2012 they released their fourth album "Metaparáforas", metaphors of the invisible worlds, where they narrate different situations that the characters of La Montaña Gris experience when they have to leave the world of humans.

In October 2012 they began a trip around South America, starting Brazil and going around the continent until arriving to Ecuador, entitled: "Travesía Sudamericana 2012 – 2014" (South American Crossing 2012 – 2014).

On May 28, 2015, they performed "Paseo sinfónico" (Symphonic walk), an anniversary concert with the symphony orchestra of El Santuario, at the Pablo Tobón Uribe Theater in Medellín.

== Members ==
- Pablo Villegas – vocals and violin
- Sara Zapata – vocals
- Daniel Montoya – guitar
- Diego Gómez – bass
- Fernando Ospina – percussion
- Juan David Estrada – Scottish bagpipe and violin
- Luisa García – violin, percussion and choirs

== Discography ==
- Canto Primio (2004)
- En el regazo de la caramañola (2006)
- Alboroque Irlandés (2010)
- Metaparáforas (2012)
