= Alejandría =

- Municipality
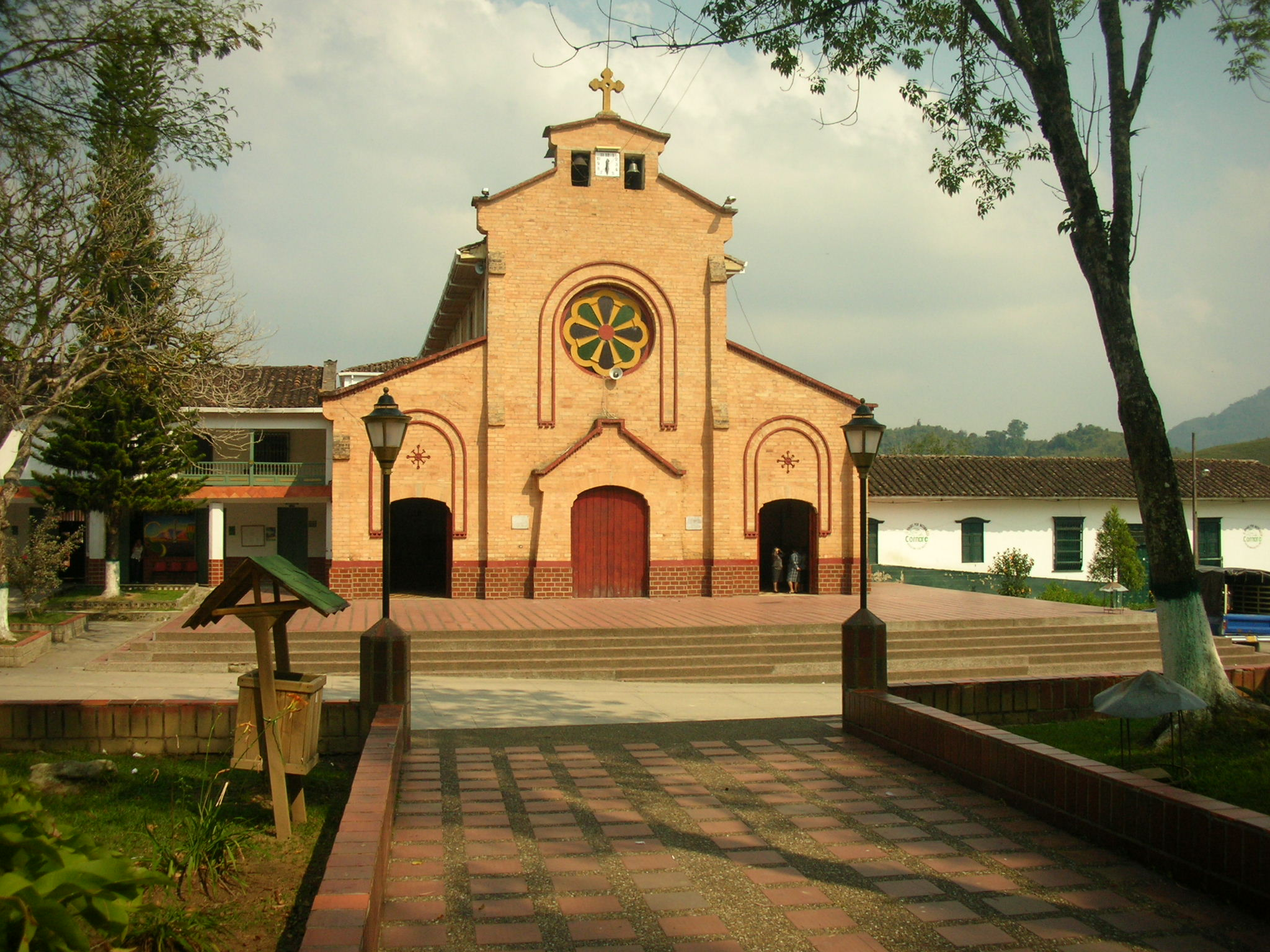

- Flag Coat of arms

- Location of the municipality of Alejandría in the Antioquia Department

- Location in Colombia
- Coordinates: 6°22′37″N 75°08′28″W
- Country: Colombia
- Region: Andean Region
- Department: Antioquia Department
- Subregion: Eastern

Alejandría (Spanish for the name Alexandria) is a town and municipality in the Antioquia Department, Colombia. It is part of the sub-region of Eastern Antioquia and is bordered to the north by the municipalities of Concepción, Santo Domingo and San Roque, on the east by the municipality of San Rafael, on the south by the municipalities of San Rafael and Guatapé, and on the west by the municipalities of El Penol and Concepción. Its capital is 90 kilometers from the city of Medellin, the capital of Antioquia department. The municipality has an area of 149 km^{2}.

== History ==
As is the case with much of eastern Antioquia, what is today Alejandria was originally inhabited by the Tahamí people.

Alejandria was founded by Don Alejandro Osorio, Mrs. Procesa Delgado, Don Salvador Cordoba and Mr. Climaco Jaramillo in 1886. By 1889 were erected the village to the township of the municipality category of Guatapé by agreement of February 20 that year.

Unlike what happened with almost all the municipalities of Antioquia, which were created by orders from departmental entities, the creation of Alejandria as a municipality was initiated by presidential decree from Bogotá. President Reyes agreed to the requests, and by decree 304 of March 1907, created the town of Alejandria.

== Generalities ==
- Foundation: 1886
- Erection in Municipality: Decree 304 of 1907
- Founders:Alejandro Osorio, Procesa Delgado, Salvador Cordova and Climaco Jaramillo
- Appeals: The Pearl of Nare.
- Height above sea level: 1650.
- Temperature: 20 °C.
- Demonym: Alejandrinos, (Alexandrine)

== Rural Zones, Veredas (Spanish) ==
Alejandria is divided into 15 Veredas:

- Cruces
- El Carbón
- El Cerro
- El Popo
- El Respaldo
- La Inmaculada
- La Pava
- Piedras
- Remolino
- San José
- San Lorenzo
- San Miguel
- San Pedro
- Tocaima
- San Antonio

== Neighborhoods of Alejandría (Urban Zone) ==
- Centenario
- Mirador del Nare
- Nudillales
- Quintas
- La Bomba
- Concepcion
- Cordoba
- San Pedro
- Bolivar
- Santader
- La cruz
- Villanueva
- Miraflores

== Climate ==
Alejandria has a cool tropical rainforest climate (Af) due to altitude. It has very heavy rainfall year-round.

Climate data for Alejandría, elevation 1,660 m (5,450 ft), (1981–2010)
Month	Jan	Feb	Mar	Apr	May	Jun	Jul	Aug	Sep	Oct	Nov	Dec	Year
Mean daily maximum °C (°F)	24.5 (76.1)	24.6 (76.3)	24.5 (76.1)	24.5 (76.1)	24.8 (76.6)	24.6 (76.3)	24.9 (76.8)	25.0 (77.0)	24.7 (76.5)	24.3 (75.7)	24.0 (75.2)	24.0 (75.2)	24.5 (76.1)
Daily mean °C (°F)	19.4 (66.9)	19.3 (66.7)	19.3 (66.7)	19.5 (67.1)	19.6 (67.3)	19.5 (67.1)	19.6 (67.3)	19.6 (67.3)	19.5 (67.1)	19.4 (66.9)	19.3 (66.7)	19.3 (66.7)	19.4 (66.9)
Mean daily minimum °C (°F)	14.8 (58.6)	14.7 (58.5)	15.1 (59.2)	15.4 (59.7)	15.5 (59.9)	15.2 (59.4)	14.7 (58.5)	14.7 (58.5)	15.0 (59.0)	15.1 (59.2)	15.2 (59.4)	14.9 (58.8)	15.0 (59.0)
Average precipitation mm (inches)	178.6 (7.03)	193.0 (7.60)	302.1 (11.89)	439.6 (17.31)	505.6 (19.91)	433.3 (17.06)	400.4 (15.76)	447.7 (17.63)	568.9 (22.40)	545.6 (21.48)	348.6 (13.72)	216.0 (8.50)	4,579.2 (180.28)
Average precipitation days (≥ 1.0 mm)	15	16	21	25	26	21	20	21	25	26	24	20	260
Average relative humidity (%)	88	88	89	88	89	88	87	87	88	88	89	89	88
Mean monthly sunshine hours	145.7	127.1	117.8	114.0	142.6	144.0	186.0	201.5	156.0	136.4	126.0	133.3	1,730.4
Mean daily sunshine hours	4.7	4.5	3.8	3.8	4.6	4.8	6.0	6.5	5.2	4.4	4.2	4.3	4.7
Source: Instituto de Hidrologia Meteorologia y Estudios Ambientales

== Demographics ==
Population Total: 4.657 inhabitants. (2018)

- Urban population: 2.561
- Rural population: 2.096

Literacy: 99.4% (2005)

- Urban Zone: 99.6%
- Rural Zone: 99.0%

=== Ethnography ===
According to figures submitted by the DANE of the census 2005, composition ethnographic the municipality is:

- Métis & White (99.7%)
- Afro (0.3%)

==== Roads ====
It has multiple access roads from Medellin city to the municipality of Alejandria:

- Route Medellin - Guarne - San Vicente - Concepcion - Alejandria Completely paved road
- Route Medellin - Barbosa - Concepcion - Alejandria, with uncovered stretch of road about 12 km from Barbosa.
- Route Medellin - Barbosa - Molino Viejo - Santo Domingo - Alejandria uncovered section of track with about 16 km from Santo Domingo.
- Route Medellin - Guarne - Marinilla - Penol - Guatape - Alejandria, with uncovered stretch of road about 25 km from Guatape.
- Route Medellin - Guarne - Marinilla - Penol - Guatape Alejandria-San Rafael: uncovered section of track with about 25 km from San Rafael.

== Economy ==
- Tourism fishing, hiking, horseback riding, river rides
- Agriculture coffee, cane, fique, beans
- Livestock of up and Milk
- Mining: gold, silver
- Production of hydroelectric.

== Events ==
- Celebrations of sympathy. First week of January. They are the traditional celebrations of the municipality, and exposes them the joy of the Alexandrians.
- Easter. We live the religious festival of Catholicism, and the municipality are carried out plays, and religious processions.
- Departmental abut Bands. Each year in March, takes place in the municipality, a musical encounter with different bands of the department.
- May 1. Sports activities are held
- Corpus Christi. With religious shrines through the streets of the town is celebrating this religious festival.
- celebrations of the Virgen del Carmen, July 16. This religious festival is celebrated with parades and pageants.
- Feast of the Antioquenidad, on August 11. Artistic representations are made about the culture paisa.
- Theatre Festival, Month of August
- Patron Saint Peter of Alejandria, November 22. It parades and other religious activities.
- Holidays. Christmas novenas are performed, musical concerts, and other activities.

== Sites of interest ==
Natural heritage

- Reservoirs of San Lorenzo and El Penol-Guatape
- River Nare, with many attractions such as natural pools, meadows, and fishing sabaleta
- Waterfall "Bridal Veil" located 5 km of the head on the sidewalk swirl
- Waterfall "Sabina", located 3 miles from the trail head in the Whirlwind, imposing waterfall of 60 m high
- River Nudillales, with sites for the enjoyment of fishing and bathing
- Nudillales Spa, located in the Centenario neighborhood, has natural pools, and areas suitable for camping trips and pot.
- Height Combo
- Nature Reserve San Lorenzo
- River Piedras
- Lake the Perucho

Historical and artistic heritage

- Bridge Nudillales located 0.5 km in the header. The appeal of this site are the pools for swimming
- Bridge of Purgatory, located 12 kilometers from the head on the sidewalk Swirl. The attraction of this site is the bridge for its antiquity and former obligatory step of communication with the northeast region and gold transport
- Church of St. Peter of Alejandria. In 1884 he created the first chapel
- Former home of Alejandro Osorio, founder of the municipality.
- Bridge of Cirpes
- Library Municipal Alejandro Osorio, where there is a photographic record of the history of the town.
- Museum school of music.
- principal Park of Alejandria.
