= San Vicente Municipality =

San Vicente Municipality may refer to:

- Colombia
  - San Vicente, Antioquia
- El Salvador
  - San Vicente, El Salvador
- Philippines
  - San Vicente, Camarines Norte
  - San Vicente, Ilocos Sur
  - San Vicente, Palawan
  - San Vicente, Northern Samar
