= Eastern Antioquia =

Subregion of Antioquia, Colombia

Location of the Eastern Antioquia region within the Department of Antioquia

Eastern Antioquia (Spanish: Oriente Antioqueño) is subregion of the Colombian Department of Antioquia. The region consists of 23 municipalities.

== Geography ==
The region of Eastern Antioquia limits to the north west with the Metropolitan Area of Medellín and with Northeastern Antioquia region. To the east the region borders with the Magdalena Medio Antioquia region, to the south with Caldas Department and to the west with a section of the Southwestern Antioquia region, covering a total area of 8,094 km^{2}, approximately 13% of the total area of Antioquia Department.

== Municipalities ==
The region is covered by 23 municipalities being Guarne the closest to the city of Medellín located some 24 km away. The largest municipality of this region is Sonsón with a total area of 1,323 km^{2} and the smallest is Argelia.

The isolated village of Puente Linda on the border with the Caldas Department

- Abejorral
- Alejandría
- Argelia
- Carmen de Viboral
- Cocorná
- Concepción
- El Peñol
- Granada
- Guarne
- Guatape
- La Ceja
- La Unión
- Marinilla
- Nariño
- Retiro
- Rionegro
- San Carlos
- San Francisco
- San Luis
- San Rafael
- San Vicente
- Santuario
- Sonsón

== Demographics ==
The population in this region is distributed evenly between the urban and rural areas with 43% of the people living in the urban centers and 57% living in the countryside.
