= Daniel Florence O'Leary =

Irish general and aide-de-camp under Simón Bolívar (1801–1854)

- Dónall Fínín Ó Laoghaire
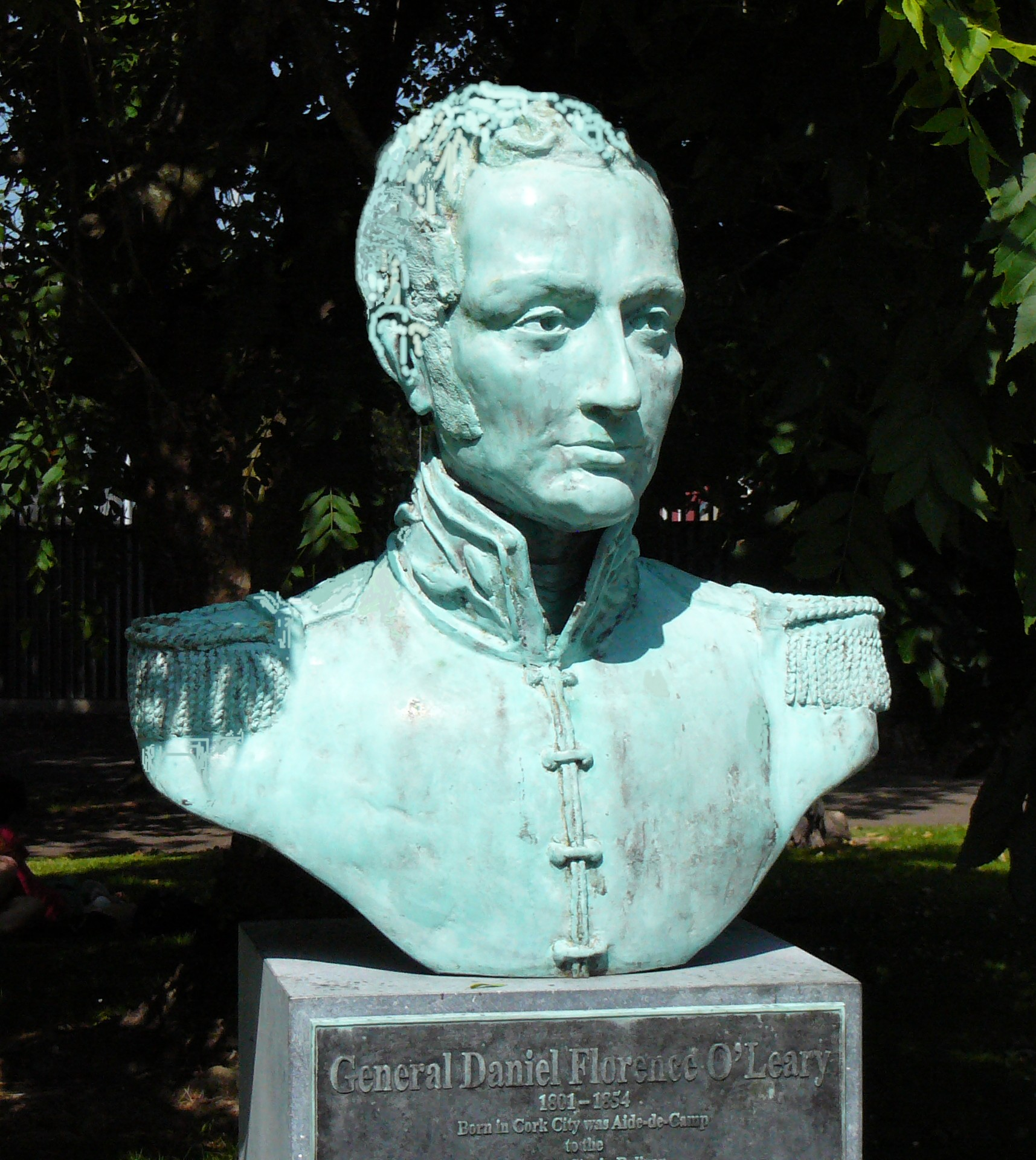
- Bust of General O'Leary, Fitzgerald Park, Cork
- Born: 14 February 1801; Cork, Ireland, United Kingdom of Great Britain and Ireland
- Died: 24 February 1854 (aged 53); Santa Fé de Bogotá, Republic of New Granada
- Military career
- Allegiance: Venezuelan republicans
- Rank: Brigadier general
- Conflicts: Spanish American wars of independence Battle of Pantano de Vargas Battle of Boyacá Battle of Pichincha Battle of Portete de Tarqui

Daniel Florence O'Leary (Irish: Dónall Fínín Ó Laoghaire; 14 February 1801 – 24 February 1854) was a military general and aide-de-camp under Simón Bolívar.

== Life ==
O'Leary was born in Cork, Ireland; his father was Jeremiah O'Leary, a butter merchant. In 1817, Daniel O'Leary emigrated to South America.

Unlike many of the Irish who fought for Simon Bolívar in his many campaigns to win South American independence, O'Leary had not served in the Napoleonic Wars.

In 1827 he married Soledad Soublette, the younger sister of General Carlos Soublette, with whom he had nine children.

On September 16, 1829, the Government Council of Colombia entrusted him with a division of 800 war veterans, including the Rifles battalion, to fight General José María Córdova's revolution in the province of Antioquia. The clash between the two forces took place on October 17, 40 kilometers outside Medellín at the site of El Santuario. Córdova had only 300 men, fought with his usual valor, and was killed by an Irish Colonel Rupert Hand, who hit him with three saber blows to the head and hand.

After Bolívar's death in 1830, O'Leary disobeyed orders to burn the general's personal documents. He spent much of the rest of his life organizing them, along with writing his own very extensive memoirs (spanning thirty-four volumes) of his time fighting in the revolutionary wars with Bolívar. He died in Bogotá, Colombia. He is buried in the National Pantheon of Venezuela since 1882.

A bust and plaque honouring O'Leary were presented by the Venezuelan Government to the people of Cork and unveiled on 12 May 2010 by the Venezuelan Ambassador to Ireland, Samuel Moncada.

In 1997, the Archive of the Liberator Simón Bolívar was inscribed by UNESCO in the International Memory of the World Register and in the Regional Register for Latin America and the Caribbean in 2011.

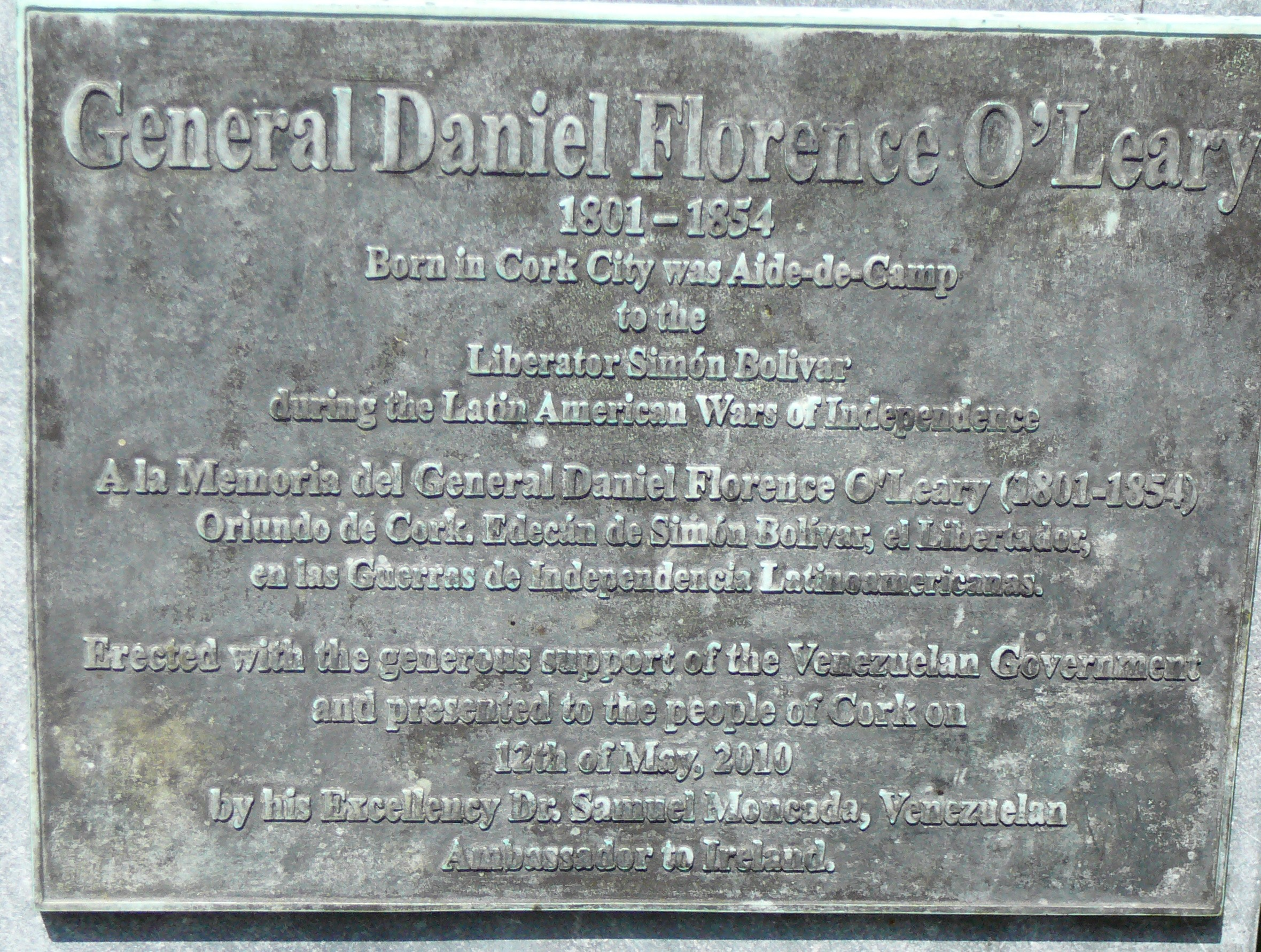
Plaque below the bust of General Daniel O'Leary

== See also ==
- Irish military diaspora
