= Concatedral de San Nicolás el Magno =

St. Nicholas Cathedral
- Concatedral de San Nicolás el Magno
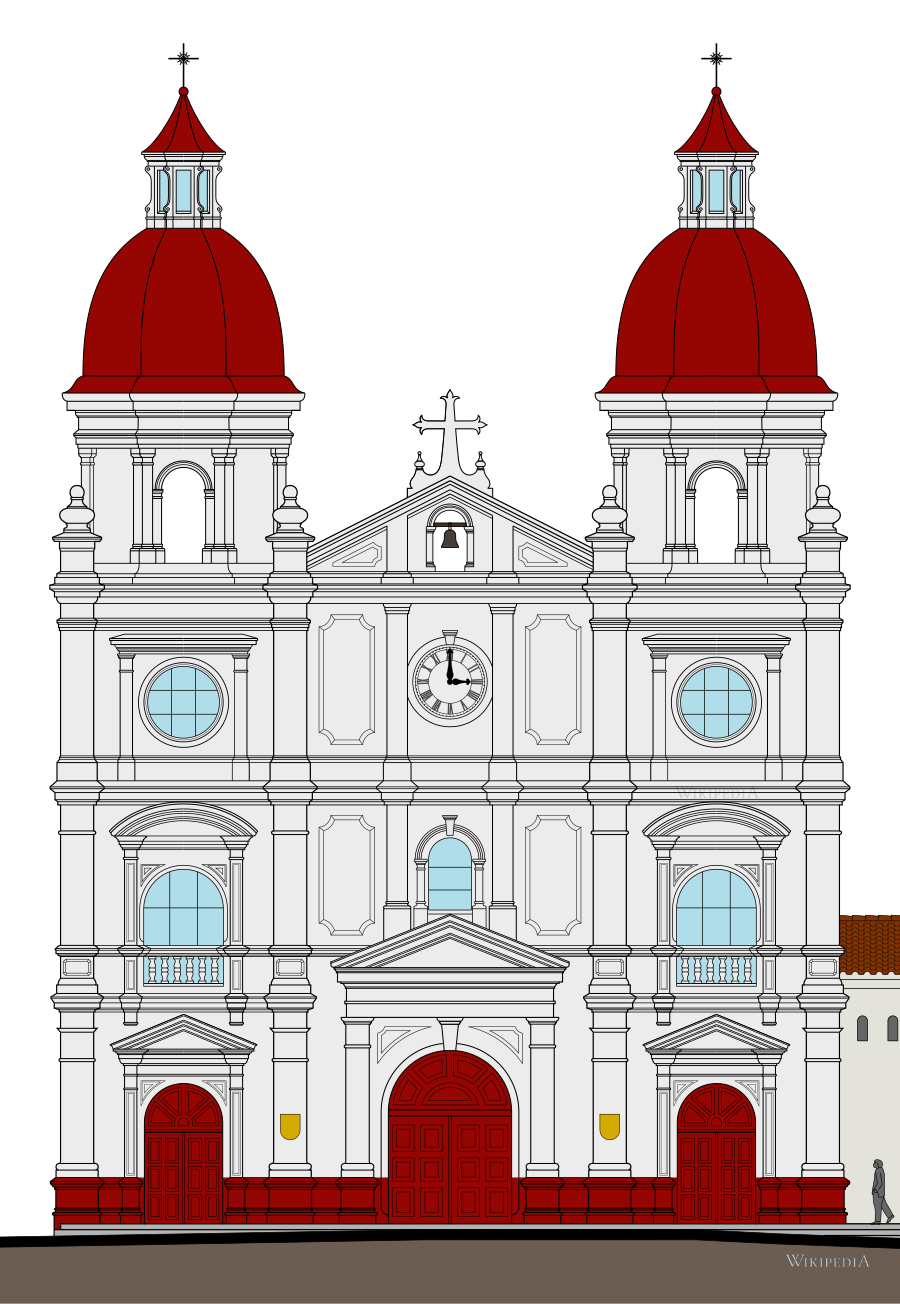
- Artists rendition of the cathedral in Rionegro.
- St. Nicholas Cathedral
- 6.154°N 75.374°W
- Country: Rionegro, Antioquia, Colombia
- Denomination: Roman Catholic

History
- Founded: 1668

Architecture
- Style: Neoclassical
- Years built: 1793 - September 8, 1804

Administration
- Diocese: Sonsón–Rionegro

The Catedral San Nicolás el Magno is a Roman Catholic co-cathedral, located in the municipality of Rionegro, Antioquia, Colombia. The church, under the Diocese of Sonsón-Rionegro is dedicated to Saint Nicholas and was elevated to the title of cathedral on 20 April 1968 by Pope Paul VI.

== History ==
The first church dates from between 1662 and 1668, and it became a center of evangelisation for the first priests and missionaries arriving from Europe. 125 years later, on March 8 of 1793, the then bishop of Popayán, Ángel Velarde y Bustamante, made a pastoral visit to the church and was affected by what he saw as evil spirits in the church. Obtaining consent, he saw that the old temple was demolished and asked for administrative and communal funding and support to erect a new church in its place. The bishops Jose Pablo de Villa and Jose Felix de Mejía would be in charge of administering these resources, in addition to directing and handling the work of the new parochial church.

The old church was demolished in the same year (1793), and the church commenced construction, with walls made of limestone and brick and later reinforced with mud. The style of the church was heavily influenced by the Iglesia de la Candelaria that had been built in Medellín twenty years earlier. The chief construction official was Antonio de Orozco, and the painter, Jose Pablo Chávez, a native of Cali and resident of Santa Fe de Antioquia was brought in to paint the lower part of the balconies depicting a ship and skies. In December 1803 the Father's Jose Pablo de Villa and Mateo Cardona began to celebrate in the new church, not yet finished, and finally on 8 September 1804, with a solemn inauguration, the church was officially opened.

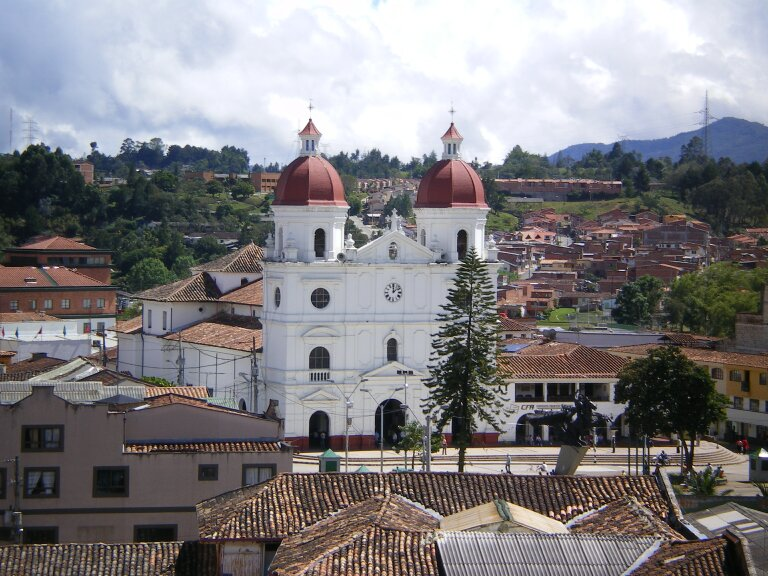
Catedral de San Nicolás el Magno

On 21 March 1812, a treaty was signed and proclaimed in the church for the Constitution of the Free and Independent Sovereign State of Antioquia from colonial rule, in which 19 representatives of the towns of Antioquia participated. The independence was proclaimed in the pulpit of the church by the Bishop Jose Felix de Mejía, who was incidentally an uncle of the ex-president Liborio Mejía. On April 7, 1814, the funeral and subsequent burial of the dictator President of Colombia Juan del Corral took place.

In 1892, the first substantial modification of interior and exterior occurred where the altarpieces of and clock dating from 1837 were altered. A meeting held on 30 December 1890, had decided that the two lateral towers of the main facade of the church, that originally had been made from wood were on the verge of sinking and needed immediate repair. The diocese set a budget of 1,500 pesos to conduct restoration work, but the total cost far exceeded this at 2,801 pesos.

In 1926 a second structural change took place, when the Colombian architect Tomás Uribe and the Belgian architect Agustín Goovaerts, were hired to modify the original gothic one and redesign the main facade in a neoclassic style. Completed in 1940, this design of the cathedral remains today. Later, in 1954, a silver lining of the table of the altar was inducted by silversmith Carlos Minami after a donation. In 1957, the central altar was altered, replacing its old oil paintings with the present gilded one laminated in gold, and reconstructions of the altar structure with plaster reproductions.

On March 18 of 1957, the Diocese of Sonsón was created by means of the “In Apostolici Muneris” of Pope Pius XII, dismantling the territory of the Archdiocese of Medellín, and creating the parish of San Nicholas of Rionegro within this new territory. On February 8 of 1959, the Coronation of Nuestra Señora del Rosario de Arma conducted by Archbishop Paolo Bertoli, took place in the presence of the civilian authorities, military, ecclesiastical clergy and the public, which occupied the main square of Rionegro on the day.

Between the years of 1963 and 1965, the Catedral de San Nicolás the niches of the ships on the altar underwent change and were modernised from the original gothic style. After this Samuel Alvarez B. was appointed to the task of reconstructing and extending the cathedral laterally, affecting the mausoleum of dictator Juan de Corral (buried in 1814). With architect Nel Rodríguez, the construction of a new parochial hall and side buildings took place in the 1970s, with works concluded in 1977.

On April 20 of 1968, the church was elevated to that of a Co-cathedral, proclaimed by Pope Paul VI and has since evolved to become a part of the Diocese of Sonsón-Rionegro.
