= Guarne =

Coordinates: 6°16′48.04″N 75°26′33.84″W

- Municipality
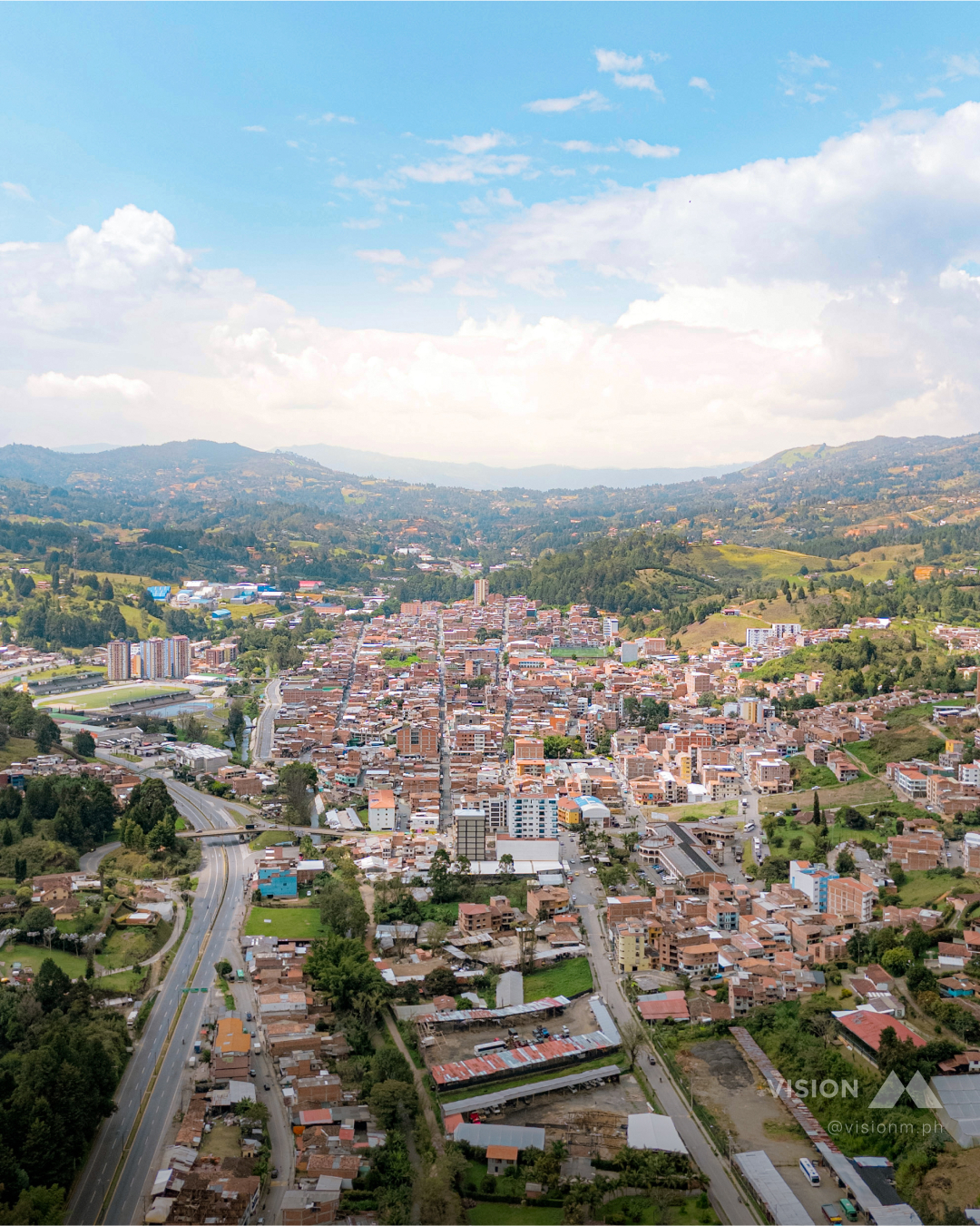

- Flag Coat of arms

- Location of the municipality and town of Guarne in the Antioquia Department of Colombia
- Country: Colombia
- Department: Antioquia Department
- Subregion: Eastern
- Established: 01 of January 1541

Area
  - Urban: 4 km^{2} (1.5 sq mi)
  - Metro: 151 km^{2} (58 sq mi)
- Elevation: 2,150 m (7,050 ft)

Population (2020 est.)
  - Municipality: 52,129
- Time zone: UTC-5 (Colombia Standard Time)
- Website: http://www.guarne-antioquia.gov.co/

Guarne is a town and municipality in the Colombian department of Antioquia. In 2020, the population was estimated to be 52,129. It is part of the subregion of Eastern Antioquia. It is situated 24 km east of Medellín.

== History ==
The first settlers of Guarne were Tahamíes Indians who came from the Nare River. In 1541, Alvaro Mendoza entered the Guarne area, but finding no gold, returned to the Aburrá Valley. In 1640, searching for gold, Captain Fernando del Toro Zapata and Diego Beltran del Castillo arrived at Guarne. The first non-Amerindian settlers of the area of Guarne were slaves. In 1757, Guarne became part of Rionegro, and in 1814, Juan del Corral created the Guarne Township.
