= San Francisco, Antioquia =

San Francisco
- Municipality and town
- Flag

- Location of the municipality and town of San Francisco in the Antioquia Department of Colombia

- Location in Colombia
- Coordinates: 5°57′51″N 75°6′6″W
- Country: Colombia
- Department: Antioquia Department
- Subregion: Eastern
- Established: February 16, 1986
- Elevation: 1,250 m (4,100 ft)

Population (2015)
  - Total: 5,318
- Time zone: UTC-5 (Colombia Standard Time)

San Francisco is a town and municipality in Antioquia Department, Colombia. It is part of the subregion of Eastern Antioquia. In 2015, the population comprised 5,318 people.

== History ==
San Francisco was previously known as El Morrón.

It was founded in 1830 as part of the municipality of Cocorná. In February 1986 was established as a municipality with the name of San Francisco, in memory of Saint Francis of Assisi.

== Climate ==
San Francisco has a tropical rainforest climate (Af). It has very heavy rainfall year-round.

Climate data for San Francisco, Antioquia, elevation 1,306 m (4,285 ft), (1981–2010)
Month	Jan	Feb	Mar	Apr	May	Jun	Jul	Aug	Sep	Oct	Nov	Dec	Year
Mean daily maximum °C (°F)	25.9 (78.6)	26.0 (78.8)	25.8 (78.4)	25.9 (78.6)	26.0 (78.8)	26.1 (79.0)	26.3 (79.3)	26.4 (79.5)	26.0 (78.8)	25.8 (78.4)	25.6 (78.1)	25.8 (78.4)	26.0 (78.8)
Daily mean °C (°F)	21.7 (71.1)	21.8 (71.2)	21.7 (71.1)	21.8 (71.2)	21.8 (71.2)	22.0 (71.6)	22.0 (71.6)	21.9 (71.4)	21.7 (71.1)	21.5 (70.7)	21.5 (70.7)	21.7 (71.1)	21.8 (71.2)
Mean daily minimum °C (°F)	17.2 (63.0)	17.5 (63.5)	17.5 (63.5)	17.4 (63.3)	17.4 (63.3)	17.3 (63.1)	17.1 (62.8)	17.0 (62.6)	17.0 (62.6)	17.0 (62.6)	17.1 (62.8)	17.3 (63.1)	17.2 (63.0)
Average precipitation mm (inches)	292.2 (11.50)	286.6 (11.28)	379.5 (14.94)	493.9 (19.44)	525.3 (20.68)	346.1 (13.63)	339.5 (13.37)	427.3 (16.82)	584.9 (23.03)	610.9 (24.05)	572.9 (22.56)	374.8 (14.76)	5,234 (206.1)
Average precipitation days (≥ 1.0 mm)	17	17	20	23	23	19	18	20	23	25	25	21	249
Average relative humidity (%)	89	89	89	89	89	89	88	88	90	90	90	90	89
Source: Instituto de Hidrologia Meteorologia y Estudios Ambientales

== Demographics ==
Total Population: 5 318 people. (2015)

- Urban Population: 2 446
- Rural Population: 2 872

Literacy Rate: 75.5% (2005)

- Urban Areas: 77.9%
- Rural Areas: 74.2%
