= Cocorná =

Municipality and town in Antioquia, Colombia

- Municipality & Town
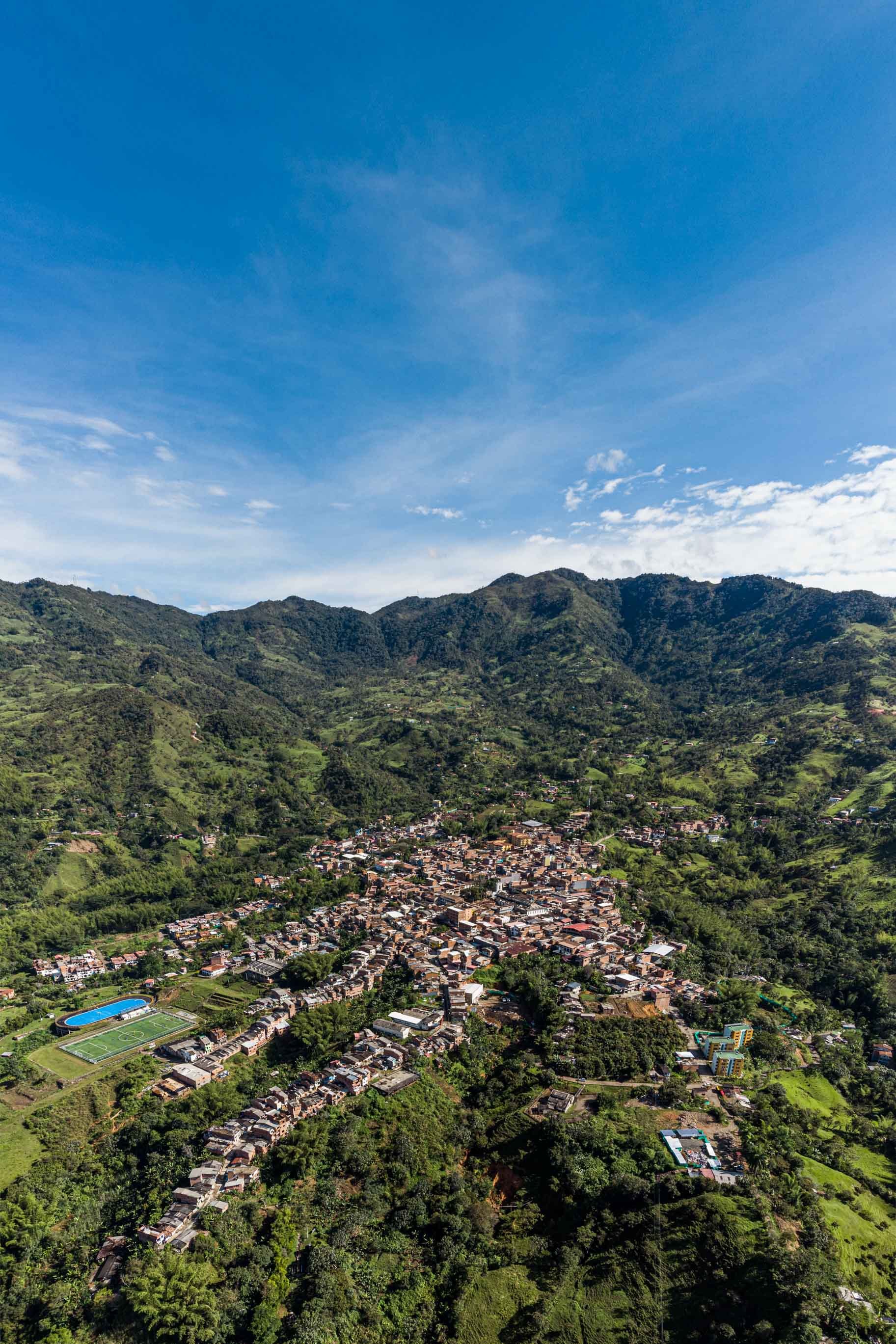

- Flag

- Location of the municipality of Cocorná in the Antioquia Department

- Location in Colombia
- Coordinates: 6°3′25″N 75°11′7″W
- Country: Colombia
- Region: Andean Region
- Department: Antioquia Department
- Subregion: Eastern

Government
  - Alcalde: Hector Duque Ramirez

Area
  - Total: 210 km^{2} (81 sq mi)
- Elevation: 1,300 m (4,300 ft)

Population (Census 2018)
  - Total: 14,743
  - Density: 70/km^{2} (180/sq mi)
- Website: www.cocorna-antioquia.gov.co

Cocorná is a town and municipality in the Colombian department of Antioquia. The population was 14,743 at the 2018 census. It is part of the subregion of Eastern Antioquia.

== Geography ==
Cocorná has an extension of 210 km², with a mountainous territory, great extensions of forest, and many important rivers.

== Climate ==
Cocorná has a relatively cool tropical rainforest climate (Af) due to altitude. It has very heavy rainfall year round.

Climate data for Cocorná
Month	Jan	Feb	Mar	Apr	May	Jun	Jul	Aug	Sep	Oct	Nov	Dec	Year
Mean daily maximum °C (°F)	26.8 (80.2)	27.5 (81.5)	27.7 (81.9)	26.9 (80.4)	26.8 (80.2)	27.0 (80.6)	27.4 (81.3)	27.3 (81.1)	26.9 (80.4)	26.2 (79.2)	26.0 (78.8)	26.0 (78.8)	26.9 (80.4)
Daily mean °C (°F)	21.5 (70.7)	22.0 (71.6)	22.3 (72.1)	22.0 (71.6)	22.0 (71.6)	21.9 (71.4)	21.9 (71.4)	21.9 (71.4)	21.6 (70.9)	21.3 (70.3)	21.3 (70.3)	21.1 (70.0)	21.7 (71.1)
Mean daily minimum °C (°F)	16.3 (61.3)	16.5 (61.7)	16.9 (62.4)	17.2 (63.0)	17.3 (63.1)	16.8 (62.2)	16.4 (61.5)	16.5 (61.7)	16.4 (61.5)	16.4 (61.5)	16.6 (61.9)	15.3 (59.5)	16.6 (61.8)
Average rainfall mm (inches)	255.7 (10.07)	243.8 (9.60)	328.8 (12.94)	447.0 (17.60)	483.9 (19.05)	316.2 (12.45)	306.0 (12.05)	349.0 (13.74)	471.7 (18.57)	526.7 (20.74)	460.8 (18.14)	325.0 (12.80)	4,514.6 (177.75)
Average rainy days	16	15	19	22	21	17	16	17	22	25	23	20	233
Source 1:
Source 2:

== Economy ==
- Tourism
- Agriculture, specially of sugar and maize.

== Roads ==
Is 90 km away from Medellín, 1 hour and a half in car, by an excellent road. It also has roads to the Corregimiento La Piñuela, and the municipalities of San Francisco and Granada.

== Tourism ==
Cocorná has been since the 1980s a touristic place for many people, and since 2006, the government, believing in all the potential Cocorná has for it, has been sponsoring economical investments in the area.

New hotels, and many projects that involve new jobs, are the result of that.

== Sites of interest ==
- Rivers where people can practice fishing, or simply enjoy the natural pools formatted by the river
- Water Falls there are many and very near to the municipality
- Forest very well conserved
- Landscape
