= Retiro, Antioquia =

El Retiro
- Municipality and town
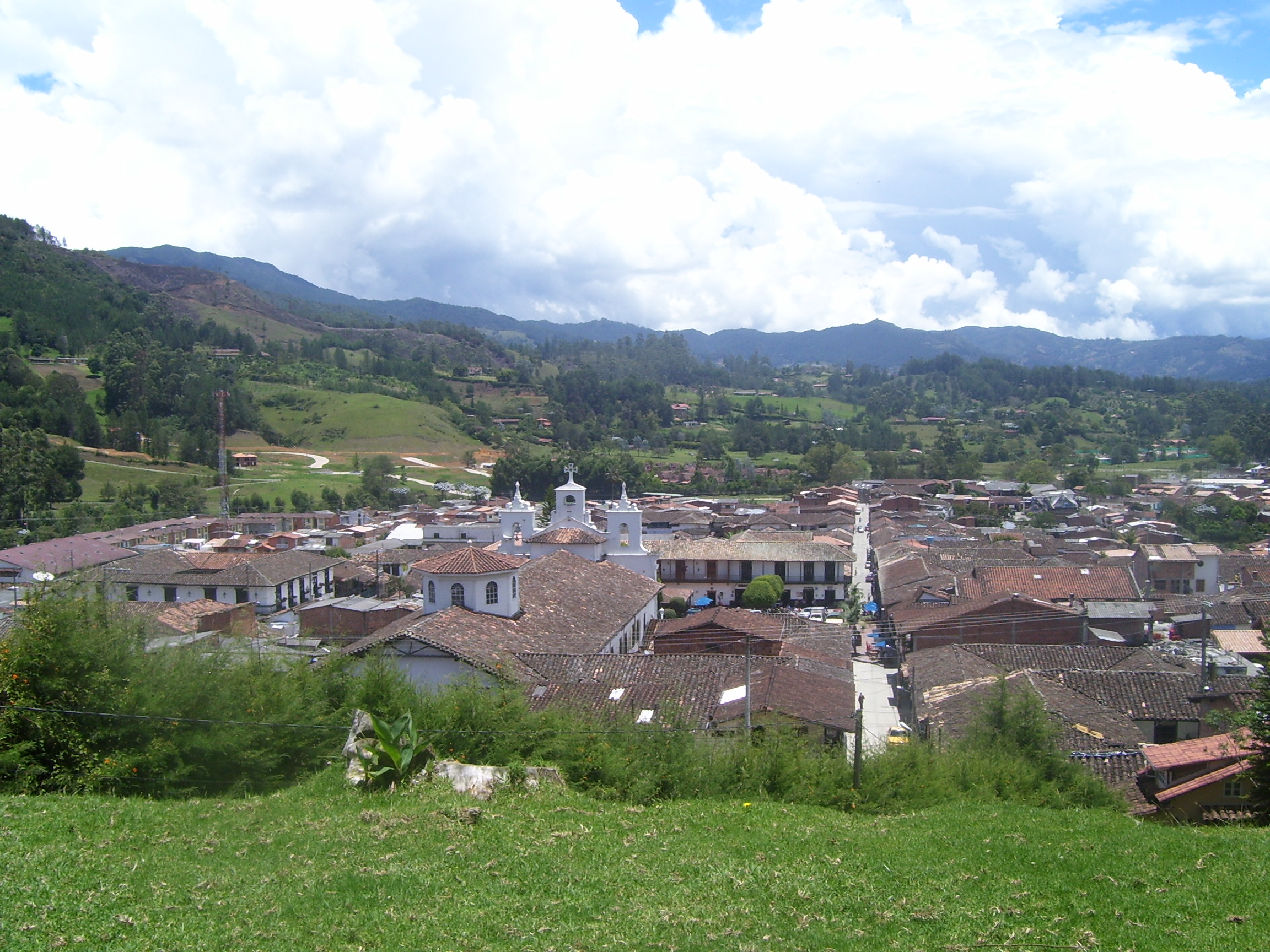

- Flag Coat of arms

- Location of the municipality and town of Retiro in the Antioquia Department of Colombia

- Location in Colombia
- Coordinates: 6°05′N 75°30′W
- Country: Colombia
- Department: Antioquia Department
- Subregion: Eastern

Area
  - Total: 273 km^{2} (105 sq mi)

Population (Census 2018)
  - Total: 20,700
- Time zone: UTC-5 (Colombia Standard Time)

El Retiro is a town and municipality in Antioquia Department, Colombia. Part of the subregion of Eastern Antioquia, its population was 20,700 at the 2018 census.

The Lycée Français de Medellin, a French international school, has its campus in El Retiro.

== History ==
Retiro holds a unique place in world history because of Don Ignacio Castañeda and his wife, Doña Javiera Londoño who settled here in 1734. Using slaves, they exploited mines around the area. On October 11, 1766, Doña Javiera signed a will she had agreed with her husband that manumitted 140 slaves upon her death and gave them the most productive of the El Guarzo mines.

== Natural Attractions ==
San Sebastián La Castellana Ecological Reserve is located between El Retiro and Envigado. It preserves 200 hectares of tropical rainforest.
