= Granada, Antioquia =

- Municipality and town
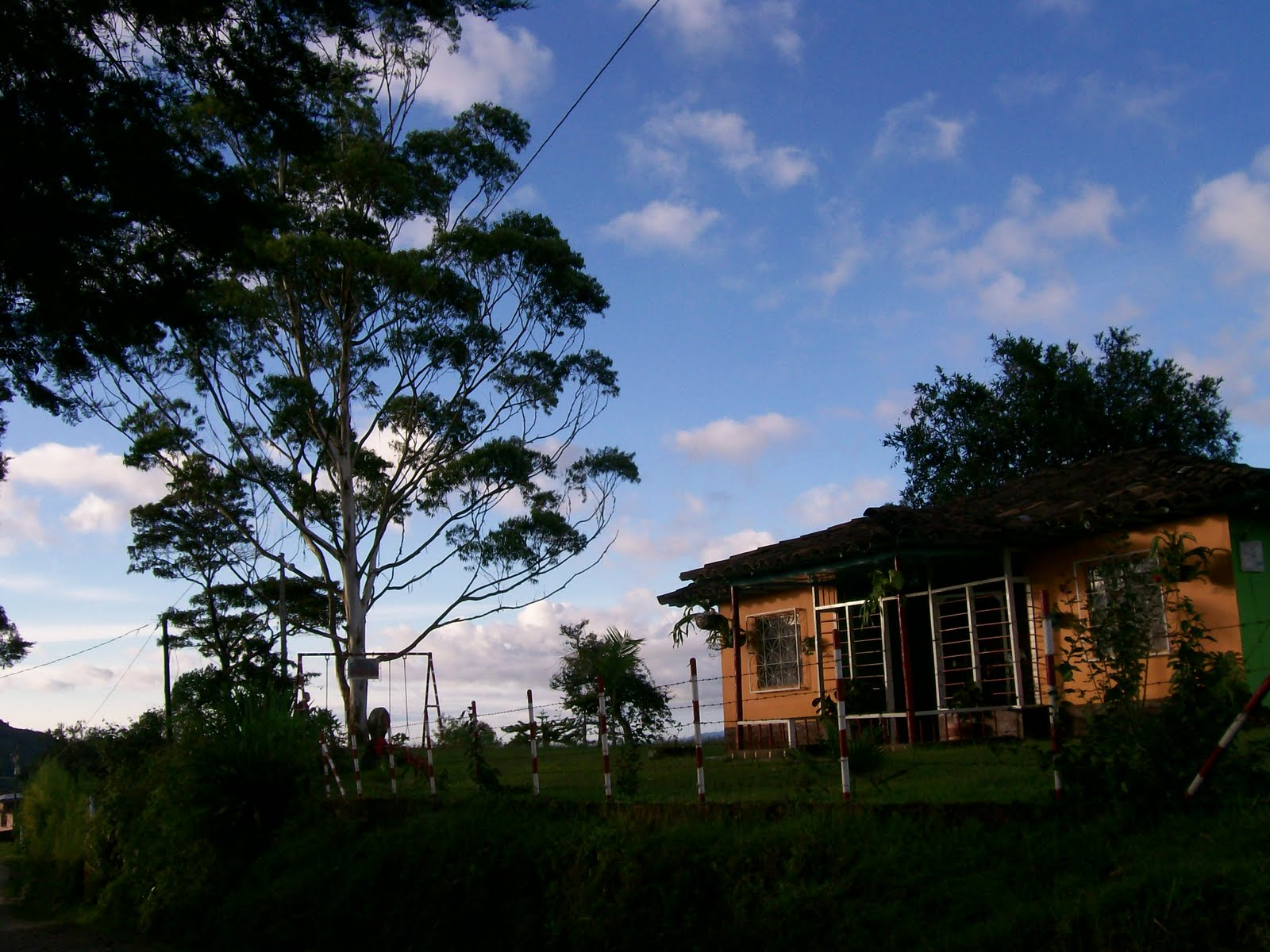

- Flag

- Location of the municipality and town of Granada, Antioquia in the Antioquia Department of Colombia
- Coordinates: 6.147°N 75.188°W
- Country: Colombia
- Department: Antioquia Department
- Subregion: Eastern

Area
  - Total: 195 km^{2} (75 sq mi)

Population (Census 2018)
  - Total: 9,204
  - Density: 47.2/km^{2} (122/sq mi)
- Time zone: UTC-5 (Colombia Standard Time)

Granada is a town and municipality in the Colombian department of Antioquia. The population was 9,204 at the 2018 census. It is part of the subregion of Eastern Antioquia. For More Info Amigranada

== Climate ==
Granada has a subtropical highland climate (Cfb). It has very heavy rainfall year-round.

Climate data for Granada
Month	Jan	Feb	Mar	Apr	May	Jun	Jul	Aug	Sep	Oct	Nov	Dec	Year
Mean daily maximum °C (°F)	21.5 (70.7)	21.8 (71.2)	21.8 (71.2)	21.5 (70.7)	21.6 (70.9)	21.7 (71.1)	21.7 (71.1)	21.8 (71.2)	21.8 (71.2)	21.1 (70.0)	21.0 (69.8)	20.9 (69.6)	21.5 (70.7)
Daily mean °C (°F)	16.9 (62.4)	17.2 (63.0)	17.3 (63.1)	17.3 (63.1)	17.4 (63.3)	17.3 (63.1)	16.9 (62.4)	17.0 (62.6)	17.0 (62.6)	16.8 (62.2)	16.8 (62.2)	16.6 (61.9)	17.0 (62.7)
Mean daily minimum °C (°F)	12.3 (54.1)	12.6 (54.7)	12.9 (55.2)	13.1 (55.6)	13.2 (55.8)	13.0 (55.4)	12.1 (53.8)	12.2 (54.0)	12.2 (54.0)	12.5 (54.5)	12.6 (54.7)	12.5 (54.5)	12.6 (54.7)
Average rainfall mm (inches)	195.9 (7.71)	244.0 (9.61)	318.2 (12.53)	433.9 (17.08)	502.6 (19.79)	383.3 (15.09)	360.0 (14.17)	462.3 (18.20)	521.1 (20.52)	504.2 (19.85)	377.0 (14.84)	254.4 (10.02)	4,556.9 (179.41)
Average rainy days	14.8	16.5	19.0	22.2	21.6	17.7	16.6	19.2	22.9	23.9	23.2	17.6	235.2
Source 1:
Source 2:
