= Marinilla =

Coordinates: 6°10′25.69″N 75°20′5.00″W

- Municipality and town
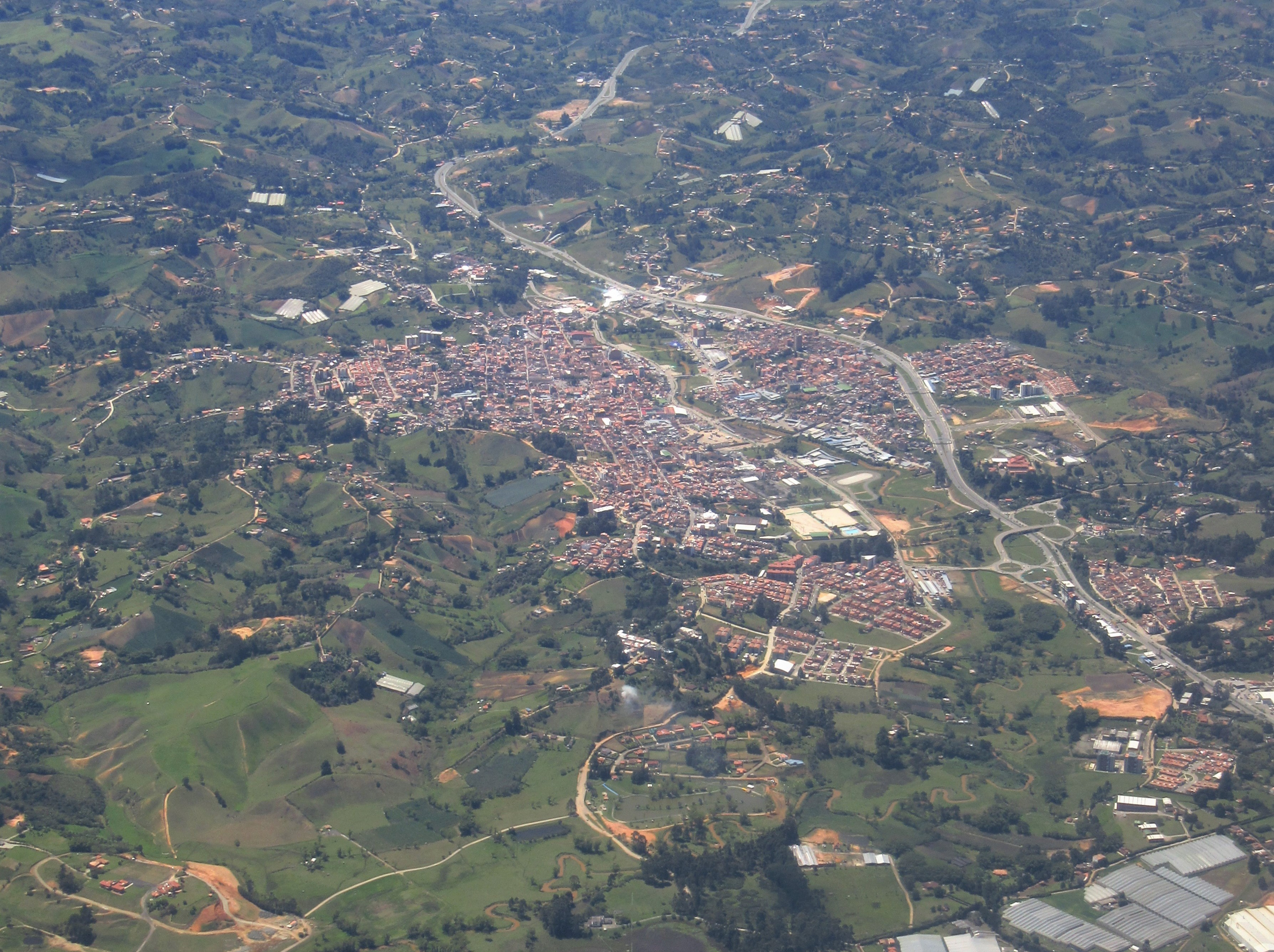
- View of Marinilla

- Flag Seal

- Location of the municipality and town of Marinilla in the Antioquia Department of Colombia
- Country: Colombia
- Department: Antioquia Department
- Subregion: Eastern

Area
  - Municipality and town: 114.9 km^{2} (44.4 sq mi)
  - Urban: 4.73 km^{2} (1.83 sq mi)
- Elevation: 2,120 m (6,960 ft)

Population (2020 est.)
  - Municipality and town: 67,893
  - Density: 590.9/km^{2} (1,530/sq mi)
  - Urban: 48,258
  - Urban density: 10,200/km^{2} (26,400/sq mi)
- Time zone: UTC-5 (Colombia Standard Time)

Marinilla is a town and municipality in the Colombian department of Antioquia. The population was estimated to be 67,893 in 2020. Marinilla is part of the subregion of Eastern Antioquia.

Its nickname is "the Colombian Sparta" because, during the Colombian War of Independence, children of Marinilla led several different battles.

The municipality is bordered to the north by San Vicente, to the east by El Peñol and El Santuario, to the west by Rionegro, and to the south by El Carmen de Viboral.
