= Concepción, Antioquia =

Concepción
- Municipality and town
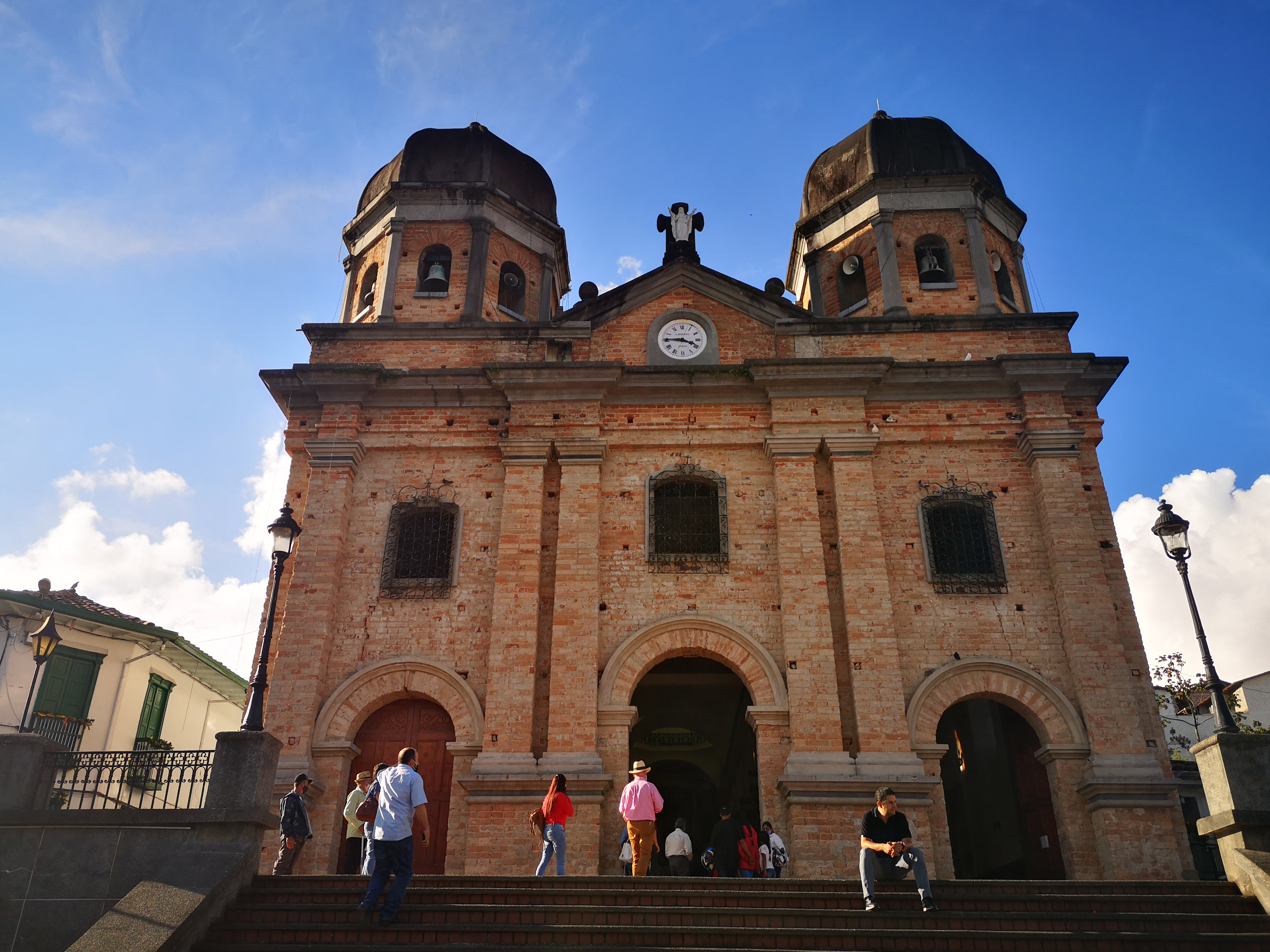

- Coat of arms

- Location of the municipality and town of Concepción in the Antioquia Department of Colombia

- Location in Colombia
- Coordinates: 6°23′42″N 75°15′30″W
- Country: Colombia
- Department: Antioquia Department

Population (2026)
  - Total: 5,136
- Time zone: UTC-5 (Colombia Standard Time)

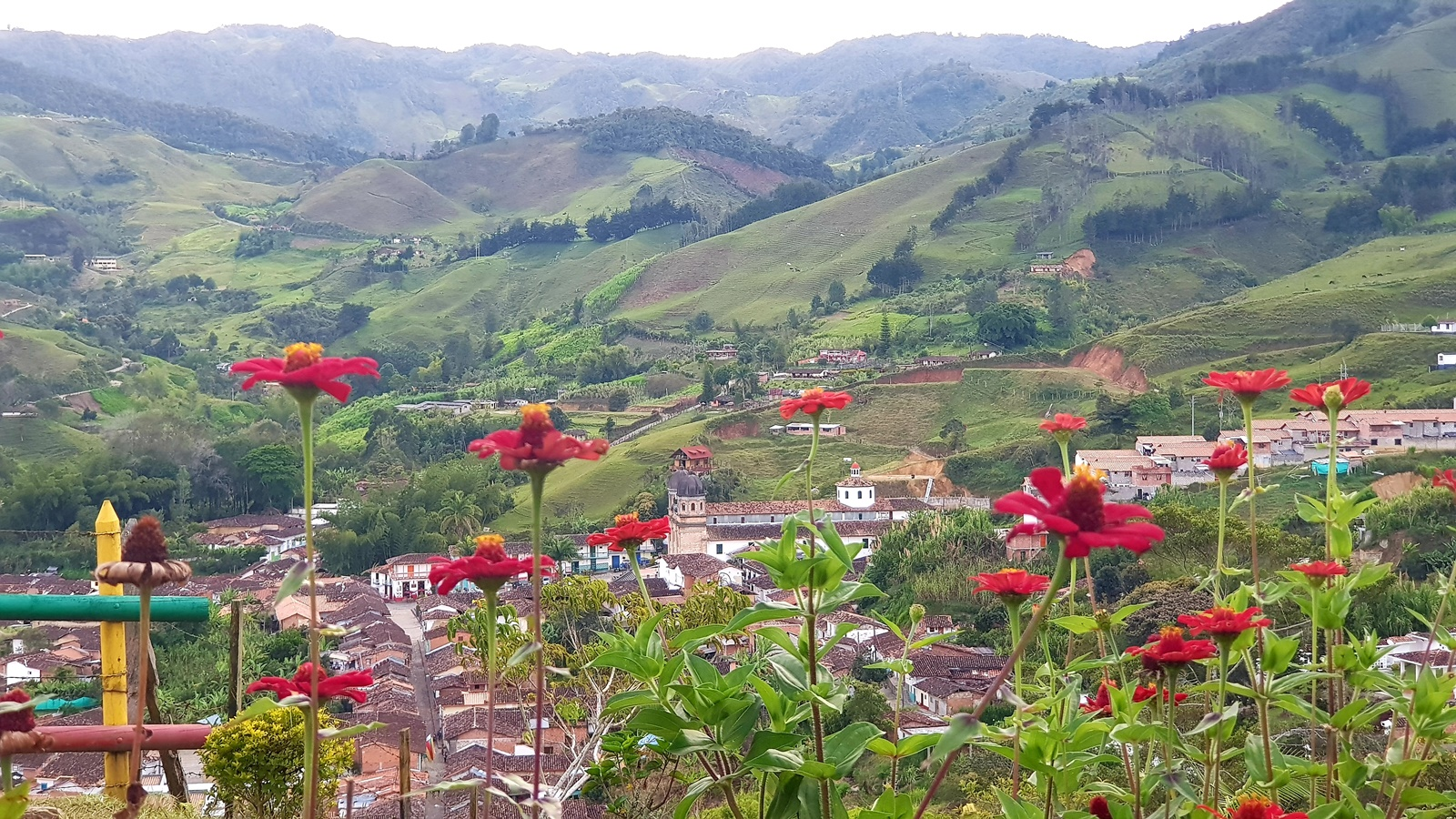
View of Concepción from Alto de la Virgen

Concepción is a town and municipality in the Colombian department of Antioquia. It is part of the subregion of Eastern Antioquia and located 75 km from Medellin.

The village was declared "Site of Cultural and National Interest" in 1999, for its stone streets and its exceptional state of conservation.

== Sites of Interest ==
This town preserves colonial sites such as the main Church, the "Casa de la Cultura", where the independency's leader Jose Maria Cordova was born, and several colonial streets, among them Tulio Ospina, Eloy Alfaro, Santander and Cordova. All around many sites: Matasano's falls, Aguacate's natural pool and a pier inside social Athakai farm.

== Climate ==
Concepción has a cool tropical rainforest climate (Af) due to altitude. It has very heavy rainfall year-round.

Climate data for Concepción
| Month | Jan | Feb | Mar | Apr | May | Jun | Jul | Aug | Sep | Oct | Nov | Dec | Year |
|---|---|---|---|---|---|---|---|---|---|---|---|---|---|
| Mean daily maximum °C (°F) | 24.0 (75.2) | 24.5 (76.1) | 24.7 (76.5) | 24.5 (76.1) | 24.6 (76.3) | 24.4 (75.9) | 24.8 (76.6) | 24.7 (76.5) | 24.3 (75.7) | 23.7 (74.7) | 23.4 (74.1) | 23.5 (74.3) | 24.3 (75.7) |
| Daily mean °C (°F) | 19.1 (66.4) | 19.5 (67.1) | 19.8 (67.6) | 19.9 (67.8) | 20.0 (68.0) | 19.6 (67.3) | 19.5 (67.1) | 19.5 (67.1) | 19.2 (66.6) | 19.1 (66.4) | 18.9 (66.0) | 18.8 (65.8) | 19.4 (66.9) |
| Mean daily minimum °C (°F) | 14.3 (57.7) | 14.6 (58.3) | 15.0 (59.0) | 15.4 (59.7) | 15.4 (59.7) | 14.9 (58.8) | 14.3 (57.7) | 14.3 (57.7) | 14.2 (57.6) | 14.6 (58.3) | 14.5 (58.1) | 14.2 (57.6) | 14.6 (58.4) |
| Average rainfall mm (inches) | 91.5 (3.60) | 133.6 (5.26) | 185.7 (7.31) | 308.3 (12.14) | 359.1 (14.14) | 291.1 (11.46) | 323.0 (12.72) | 303.4 (11.94) | 343.1 (13.51) | 346.8 (13.65) | 243.0 (9.57) | 127.1 (5.00) | 3,055.7 (120.3) |
| Average rainy days | 10 | 13 | 16 | 21 | 22 | 18 | 18 | 19 | 21 | 23 | 20 | 13 | 214 |
Source 1:
Source 2:
