= San Vicente, Antioquia =

San Vicente
- Municipality and town
- Flag Coat of arms

- Location of the municipality and town of San Vicente in the Antioquia Department of Colombia
- Coordinates: 6°16′55″N 75°19′56″W
- Country: Colombia
- Department: Antioquia Department
- Subregion: Eastern

Area
  - Total: 243 km^{2} (94 sq mi)

Population (Census 2018)
  - Total: 18,051
  - Density: 74.3/km^{2} (192/sq mi)
- Time zone: UTC-5 (Colombia Standard Time)

San Vicente Ferrer is a town and municipality in Antioquia Department, Colombia. The population was 18,051 at the 2018 census. The town of San Vicente is part of the sub-region of Eastern Antioquia.

San Vicente is bordered to the north by the municipalities of Barbosa and Concepción. To the east is the town of El Peñol. Guarne and Girardota are municipalities to the west of San Vicente. Downtown San Vicente is 48 kilometers from Medellín, the capital of Antioquia. The small town of San Vicente has an extension of 243 km^{2}.

== History ==
Like all of the surrounding regions of Eastern Antioquia, this region was originally home to the indigenous peoples of the Tahamíes and the Catíos. They were the first known inhabitants of this region. This community began its civilized life by mining minerals during the 16th century.

In 1759, José and Eusebio Ceballos Rojas, descendants of Spanish conquistadors, donated this region the land to construct a chapel. It is officially recognized that 1759 is the founding year of San Vicente. José and Eusebio Ceballos Rojas are recognized as its founders.

Residents of the region entrusted and recommended that this region become the foundation of Saint San Vicente Ferrer, which was named after the Catholic saint San Vicente Ferrer, the principal patron of the Valencia community of Spain. The virgin, Señora del Rosario de Chiquinquíra, was also recommended as the town's patron, and the community still celebrates both Catholic icons.

The inhabitants of San Vicente Ferrer ended the period of mineral exploration and developed an economy based in the livestock and agricultural industry, which still exists today.

== Transportation ==
San Vicente connects with the Autopista Medellin-Bogota. The town is one hour from Medellin, and 25 minutes from Rionegro. It also has unpaved roads that connect with Concepcion and El Peñol.

== Economy ==
- Agriculture: beans, potato, corn, cold climate fruit, vegetables
- Mining
- Livestock of all kinds
- Trade

The town is traditionally a great producer of cabuya, a material made from the local Fique plant. Many artisanal products are made of this, such as carpet, fabrics, curtains and wood hangers.

Carved wood and wickerwork are also produced here.

== Events ==
- Patron of the virgin of Chiquinquíra - July 1 to 9
- Virgin of Carmen- the last Saturday of July
- Carnival Antioqueñidad - August 11
- Hill parties or "las colinas" - December 5-7
- San Vicente Ferrer celebrations - April 5
- Traders' market - first Sunday of each month

== Climate ==
Climate data for San Vicente (Corrientes), elevation 1,950 m (6,400 ft), (1981–2010)
Month	Jan	Feb	Mar	Apr	May	Jun	Jul	Aug	Sep	Oct	Nov	Dec	Year
Mean daily maximum °C (°F)	21.9 (71.4)	22.4 (72.3)	22.0 (71.6)	22.5 (72.5)	22.5 (72.5)	22.7 (72.9)	22.4 (72.3)	22.7 (72.9)	22.7 (72.9)	22.1 (71.8)	21.8 (71.2)	21.8 (71.2)	22.2 (72.0)
Daily mean °C (°F)	17.2 (63.0)	17.3 (63.1)	17.4 (63.3)	17.6 (63.7)	17.8 (64.0)	17.7 (63.9)	17.4 (63.3)	17.6 (63.7)	17.4 (63.3)	17.3 (63.1)	17.2 (63.0)	17.3 (63.1)	17.4 (63.3)
Mean daily minimum °C (°F)	12.1 (53.8)	12.4 (54.3)	12.6 (54.7)	13.1 (55.6)	13.2 (55.8)	12.5 (54.5)	12.1 (53.8)	12.1 (53.8)	12.6 (54.7)	12.8 (55.0)	12.8 (55.0)	12.4 (54.3)	12.5 (54.5)
Average precipitation mm (inches)	96.2 (3.79)	134.1 (5.28)	171.6 (6.76)	279.7 (11.01)	301.6 (11.87)	270.0 (10.63)	281.5 (11.08)	281.8 (11.09)	304.4 (11.98)	307.6 (12.11)	228.4 (8.99)	128.5 (5.06)	2,785.4 (109.66)
Average precipitation days (≥ 1.0 mm)	13	14	17	23	22	19	18	20	21	23	21	16	223
Average relative humidity (%)	83	83	85	86	84	82	80	80	82	84	85	85	83
Mean monthly sunshine hours	176.7	163.7	145.7	129.0	164.3	168.0	210.8	204.6	177.0	139.5	132.0	170.5	1,981.8
Mean daily sunshine hours	5.7	5.8	4.7	4.3	5.3	5.6	6.8	6.6	5.9	4.5	4.4	5.5	5.4
Source: Instituto de Hidrologia Meteorologia y Estudios Ambientales
