= El Santuario =

- Municipality & Town
- Flag Coat of arms

- Location of the municipality of El Santuario in the Antioquia Department of Colombia
- Coordinates: 6°8′15″N 75°15′50″W
- Country: Colombia
- Department: Antioquia Department
- Subregion: Eastern
- Foundation: March 11, 1765

Government
  - Mayor: Juan David Zuluaga Zuluaga (2020-2023)

Area
  - Municipality & Town: 83.45 km^{2} (32.22 sq mi)
  - Urban: 2.02 km^{2} (0.78 sq mi)
- Elevation: 2,150 m (7,050 ft)

Population (2018 census)
  - Municipality & Town: 35,422
  - Density: 424.5/km^{2} (1,099/sq mi)
  - Urban: 24,614
  - Urban density: 12,200/km^{2} (31,600/sq mi)
- Time zone: UTC-5 (Colombia Standard Time)

El Santuario is a town and municipality in the Antioquia Department, Colombia. It is part of the subregion of Eastern Antioquia. El Santuario was founded on 11 March 1765 by Captain Antonio Gómez de Castro. Its elevation is 2,150 meters above sea level, with an average temperature of 17 °C. The distance reference from Medellín city, the capital of Antioquia Department, is 57 km and it has a total area of 83.45 km². This town is well known for being the place where comedian Guillermo Zuluaga "Montecristo" and actor Crisanto Alonso Vargas "Vargasvil" were born. The more significant source of its economy is agriculture, mainly vegetables, beans, potatoes and legume cultivation.
