= List of municipalities in Antioquia =

This is a list of municipalities in the Colombian department of Antioquia.

- Abejorral
- Abriaquí
- Alejandría
- Amagá
- Amalfi
- Andes
- Angelópolis
- Angostura
- Anorí
- Anza
- Apartadó
- Arboletes
- Argelia
- Armenia
- Barbosa
- Bello
- Belmira
- Betania
- Betulia
- Bolívar
- Briceño
- Buritica
- Cáceres
- Caicedo
- Caldas
- Campamento
- Cañasgordas
- Caracolí
- Caramanta
- Carepa
- Carmen de Viboral
- Carolina del Príncipe
- Caucasia
- Chigorodó
- Cisneros
- Cocorná
- Concepción
- Concordia
- Copacabana
- Dabeiba
- Don Matías
- Ebejico
- El Bagre
- El Carmen De Viboral
- Entrerríos
- Envigado
- Fredonia
- Frontino (Colombia)
- Giraldo
- Girardota
- Gómez Plata
- Granada
- Guadalupe
- Guarne
- Guatape
- Heliconia
- Hispania
- Itagüí
- Ituango
- Jardín
- Jericó
- La Ceja
- La Estrella
- La Pintada
- La Unión
- Liborina
- Maceo
- Marinilla
- Medellín
- Montebello
- Murindó
- Mutatá
- Nariño
- Nechí
- Necoclí
- Olaya
- Peñol
- Peque
- Pueblorrico
- Puerto Berrío
- Puerto Nare
- Puerto Triunfo
- Remedios
- Retiro
- Rionegro
- Sabanalarga
- Sabaneta
- Salgar
- San Andrés
- San Carlos
- San Francisco
- San Jerónimo
- San José de la Montaña
- San Juan de Urabá
- San Luis
- San Pedro
- San Pedro de Urabá
- San Rafael
- San Roque
- Santa Bárbara
- Santa Fe de Antioquia
- Santa Rosa de Osos
- Santo Domingo
- Santuario
- San Vicente
- Segovia
- Sonsón
- Sopetrán
- Támesis
- Tarazá
- Tarso
- Titiribí
- Toledo
- Turbo
- Uramita
- Urrao
- Valdivia
- Valparaíso
- Vegachí
- Venecia
- Vigía del Fuerte
- Yali
- Yarumal
- Yolombo
- Yondó
- Zaragoza
