= Montebello, Antioquia =

- Municipality and town
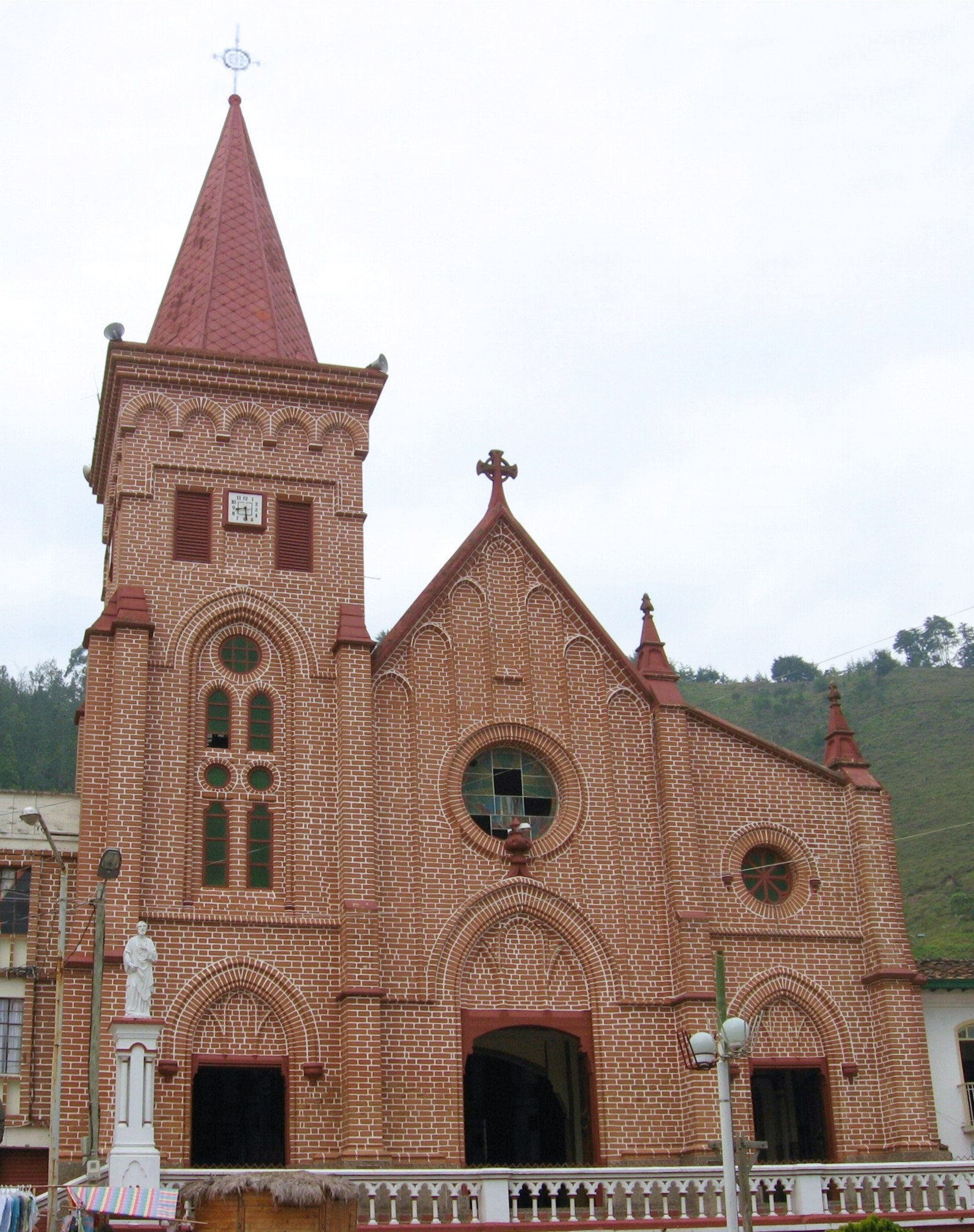
- Church of Our Lady of Mercedes

- Flag Coat of arms
- Nickname: Miracle of the Mountains
- Location of the municipality and town of Montebello, Antioquia in the Antioquia Department of Colombia

- Location in Colombia
- Coordinates: 5°55′0″N 75°30′0″W
- Country: Colombia
- Department: Antioquia Department
- Subregion: Southwestern
- Founded: June 8th, 1876

Area
  - Municipality and town: 210 km^{2} (83 sq mi)
- Elevation: 2,350 m (7,710 ft)

Population (2018)
  - Municipality and town: 6,680
  - Density: 31/km^{2} (80/sq mi)
  - Urban: 1,866
- Time zone: UTC-5 (Colombia Standard Time)

Montebello is a town and municipality in Antioquia Department, Colombia. Located at an elevation of 2,350 m (7,710 ft) above sea level, it is part of the sub-region of Southwestern Antioquia. It borders the municipality of El Retiro to the north, Fredonia and Santa Bárbara to the west, Abejorral to the south, and La Ceja and El Retiro to the east.

== History ==
Along the old route used by Spanish conquistadors, which led from Santiago de Arma to the province of Antioquia, a small village was founded in 1619 with the name Sabaletas, which is now known as Montebello.

Initially, Montebello was called Montebravo, and it was Juan Antonio Ríos who laid out the town and changed its name to the current one. It was also referred to as Nido de Águila (Eagle’s Nest).

Currently, Montebello is a small town whose progress is tied to the year 1941, when it connected to the road leading to the municipality of La Pintada.

The history of the regions that make up Montebello during the conquest and colonial times is somewhat unclear. It is known that during those times, Montebello was part of the parish of Sabaletas, a necessary stop on the route connecting the provinces of Antioquia and Popayán.

Sabaletas, in turn, was part of Santiago de Arma, which belonged to the province of Popayán until 1756, when Viceroy José Solís Folch de Cardona annexed it to Antioquia.

The first Spanish conquistadors to set foot in these lands were men under the marshal Jorge Robledo, after exterminating all the indigenous families they encountered. The lands of Montebello were assigned by the governor of Popayán, Juan de Borja, to Jacinto de Arboleda, one of his men.

Later, in 1737, the territories were acquired by José Ubaldo Vásquez, who later ceded them to the neighbors of Arma.

For a long time, no significant events occurred in the history of this municipality, until 1843, when Juan de la Cruz Gómez Plata, head of the Diocese of Medellín, ordered the church to be moved to another location during a visit to the parish of Sabaletas. This order sparked a debate among the residents, which culminated in many of them settling in what is now the town center of the municipality until the creation of a new settlement.

Around this time, a decree from the Council of La Ceja established the town as a district under the name Montebello. Twenty years later, on April 28, 1913, the Assembly of Antioquia officially made Montebello a municipality, when the governor of Antioquia was Clodomiro Ramírez.

In the district of Sabaletas, there is an ancient chapel with beautiful construction and great historical value. In its rural areas, there are ecological destinations like the El Rodeo hill, natural pools, and waterfalls.

== General Information ==
Foundation: June 8, 1619.

Montebello is called the "miracle of the mountains" because it was built in a mountainous and hard-to-reach area.

To get there, take the road to the Antioquian municipality of Santa Bárbara. From Medellín, follow the road to Santa Bárbara, ascend to Alto de Minas, and at the village of Versalles, take a left turn along the Zarcitos trail that leads to Montebello, a journey of 11.5 km on a paved road; the distance from Medellín to the town center of Montebello is 52.2 km.

Points of interest: From the town center to the Itagüí metro station, there is a distance of 40 km, which takes approximately 50 minutes to travel.

From Pereira or Manizales, continue to La Pintada and from there to Santa Bárbara, then to the Versalles district, where the previously mentioned detour via Zarcitos is taken. Another unpaved road starts from the municipality of El Retiro, with a total length of 32 kilometers, passing by the La Miel and La Honda creeks. By this unpaved road, Montebello can also be reached from the municipality of La Ceja, passing through the district of San José.

== Milenio Stéreo ==
Milenio Stéreo is a community radio station with 200 watts of power that operates from the town center of Montebello, located in the southeast of the department of Antioquia. It was assigned by the Ministry of Communications to the La Voz de Todos Broadcasting Corporation and began operations on December 12, 1997.

Its broadcast range is wide, aided by the town’s altitude of 2350 meters above sea level.

Coverage areas (based on audience reports):

- Southwest of Antioquia: Andes, Amagá, Betania, Betulia, Caldas, Caramanta, Ciudad Bolívar, Concordia, Damasco, Fredonia, Jardín, Jericó, La Pintada, Palermo, Pueblo Rico, Sabaletas, San Pablo, Santa Bárbara, Támesis, Tarso, Valparaíso, Versalles.
- Eastern Antioquia: La Ceja, El Retiro, La Unión, Abejorral.
- Chocó Department: Carmen de Atrato.
- Caldas Department: Aguadas, Anserma, Arma, Filadelfia, La Dorada, La Merced, Manizales, Marmato, Pácora, Chinchiná, and Tres Puertas.

== Political-Administrative Division ==
Besides its town center, Montebello has jurisdiction over the following populated centers: Sabaletas.

Villages: The municipality also includes the following villages:

La Honda, Zarcitos, La Trinidad, La Granja, El Caunzal, La Peña, El Tablazo, El Obispo, Getsemaní, Cortado, La Camelia, El Encenillo, El Olival, El Socorro, El Gavilán, El Carmelo, San Antonio, La Inmaculada, La Quiebra, Portugal, El Churimo, Sabanitas, Palmitas, Piedra Galana, El Aguacate, Campo Alegre, and La Merced.

== Demographics ==
Historical population:

Year	Population	±%
1938	7,887	—
1951	8,529	+8.1%
1964	9,860	+15.6%
1973	9,063	-8.1%
1985	9,608	+6.0%
1993	9,953	+3.6%
2005	7,523	-24.4%
2018	6,680	-11.2%

Montebello has a total population of 6,680 people. The urban population is 1,866, while the rural population is 4,814. The literacy rate is 88.8% (2005). Mestizos and whites make up 99.1% of the population, Afro-Colombians 0.6%, and indigenous people 0.3%.

== Economy ==
The municipality has abundant vegetation, with vast natural grasslands. Its mountains and hillsides offer a wide variety of timber for construction, dyes, and cabinetmaking. Medicinal plants are also plentiful.

Montebello, like much of Antioquia, is very rugged and well supplied with crystal-clear waters, particularly from the La Honda creeks and the La Miel River, which flows into the Buey River.

The local economy has traditionally relied on agriculture, primarily large-scale coffee production, along with plantain, avocados, beans, corn, and, to a lesser extent, tobacco, cacao, and mango.

Livestock farming, including cattle, horses, mules, and pigs, has also been prominent.

Mining stands out, with the extraction of talc and feldspar.

== Points of Interest ==
- Church of Our Lady of Mercy in the main square.
- Chapel of Our Lady of Candelaria in the district of Sabaletas (45 minutes from the town center), built before 1700, declared a National Monument in 1984, and restored by the Ferrocarril de Antioquia Foundation between 1996 and 2000.
- Chapel in the village of El Gavilán.
- Agua Blanca Waterfall (in the village of La Camelia).
- El Bramadero Museum.
- El Rodeo Hill, accessible via an ecological trail, offering one of the best landscapes in the department of Antioquia.
- Antique Museum, 10 minutes from the town, on the Versalles-Montebello road.

== See also ==
- Municipalities of Colombia
