= Urrao =

Urrao, Antioquia
- Municipality & Town
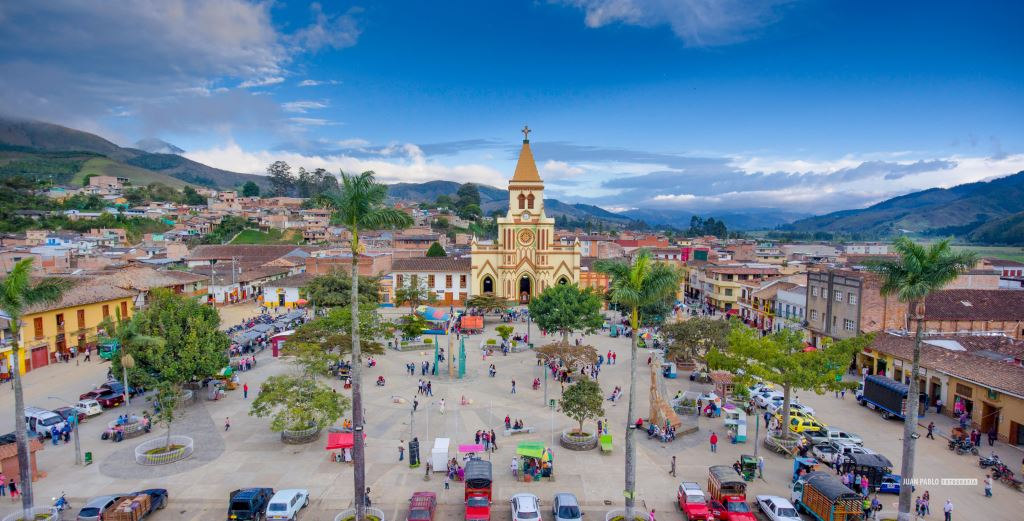
- Panorámica de Urrao.

- Flag

- Location of the municipality of Urrao, Antioquia in the Antioquia Department of Colombia

- Location in Colombia
- Coordinates: 6°19′0.7″N 76°8′4.19″W
- Country: Colombia
- Department: Antioquia Department
- Subregion: Southwestern
- Founded: June 12 of 1781

Area
  - Municipality & Town: 2,556 km^{2} (987 sq mi)
- Elevation: 1,830 m (6,000 ft)

Population (2015)
  - Municipality & Town: 44,648
  - Urban: 17,401
  - Metro density: 17.47/km^{2} (45.2/sq mi)
- Demonym(s): Urraeño, -a
- Time zone: UTC-5 (Colombia Standard Time)
- Website: https://www.urrao-antioquia.gov.co

Urrao is a town and municipality of Colombia, located in the subregion southwest of the department of Antioquia. Limited by the north with the municipalities of Frontino and Abriaquí, in the east with the municipalities of Abriaquí, Caicedo, Anzá, Betulia and Salgar, and in the south and west with Vigía del Fuerte and the department of Chocó. It is the second largest municipality in the department. As of 2015, the population comprised 44,648 people. Professional cyclist Rigoberto Urán was born and raised here.

== Climate ==
The climate is warm and temperate in Urrao. There is significant rainfall throughout the year in Urrao. Even the driest month still has a lot of rainfall. According to Köppen and Geiger, this climate is classified as Cfb. The average temperature in Urrao is 15.7 °C | 60.3 °F. About 7573 mm | 298.1 inch of precipitation falls annually.

Climate data for Urrao, elevation 1,850 m (6,070 ft), (1981–2010)
Month	Jan	Feb	Mar	Apr	May	Jun	Jul	Aug	Sep	Oct	Nov	Dec	Year
Mean daily maximum °C (°F)	22.7 (72.9)	23.0 (73.4)	23.0 (73.4)	22.7 (72.9)	22.5 (72.5)	22.7 (72.9)	22.9 (73.2)	23.0 (73.4)	22.5 (72.5)	21.9 (71.4)	21.7 (71.1)	22.0 (71.6)	22.5 (72.5)
Daily mean °C (°F)	17.3 (63.1)	17.4 (63.3)	17.6 (63.7)	17.6 (63.7)	17.6 (63.7)	17.6 (63.7)	17.5 (63.5)	17.5 (63.5)	17.2 (63.0)	17.0 (62.6)	17.1 (62.8)	17.2 (63.0)	17.4 (63.3)
Mean daily minimum °C (°F)	12.9 (55.2)	13.3 (55.9)	13.4 (56.1)	13.9 (57.0)	14.1 (57.4)	13.8 (56.8)	13.4 (56.1)	13.3 (55.9)	13.4 (56.1)	13.3 (55.9)	13.5 (56.3)	13.4 (56.1)	13.5 (56.3)
Average precipitation mm (inches)	119.0 (4.69)	113.2 (4.46)	133.8 (5.27)	199.4 (7.85)	249.7 (9.83)	182.5 (7.19)	171.9 (6.77)	170.6 (6.72)	223.6 (8.80)	295.8 (11.65)	251.7 (9.91)	162.8 (6.41)	2,273.9 (89.52)
Average precipitation days (≥ 1.0 mm)	13	12	14	19	22	18	17	18	21	24	22	17	217
Average relative humidity (%)	88	88	88	88	88	88	88	87	89	89	89	89	88
Mean monthly sunshine hours	179.8	158.1	158.1	126.0	136.4	159.0	176.7	170.5	132.0	127.1	132.0	155.0	1,810.7
Mean daily sunshine hours	5.8	5.6	5.1	4.2	4.4	5.3	5.7	5.5	4.4	4.1	4.4	5.0	5.0
Source: Instituto de Hidrologia Meteorologia y Estudios Ambientales

Climate data for Urrao (Honda La), elevation 1,850 m (6,070 ft), (1981–2010)
Month	Jan	Feb	Mar	Apr	May	Jun	Jul	Aug	Sep	Oct	Nov	Dec	Year
Mean daily maximum °C (°F)	21.6 (70.9)	21.8 (71.2)	21.6 (70.9)	21.6 (70.9)	21.9 (71.4)	21.7 (71.1)	21.7 (71.1)	21.9 (71.4)	21.4 (70.5)	21.2 (70.2)	21.0 (69.8)	21.0 (69.8)	21.6 (70.9)
Daily mean °C (°F)	16.6 (61.9)	16.7 (62.1)	16.9 (62.4)	17.0 (62.6)	17.1 (62.8)	16.9 (62.4)	16.8 (62.2)	16.8 (62.2)	16.6 (61.9)	16.5 (61.7)	16.7 (62.1)	16.5 (61.7)	16.8 (62.2)
Mean daily minimum °C (°F)	12.1 (53.8)	12.5 (54.5)	12.8 (55.0)	13.1 (55.6)	12.9 (55.2)	12.6 (54.7)	12.7 (54.9)	12.7 (54.9)	12.6 (54.7)	12.6 (54.7)	12.7 (54.9)	12.3 (54.1)	12.7 (54.9)
Average precipitation mm (inches)	63.5 (2.50)	74.3 (2.93)	94.8 (3.73)	151.8 (5.98)	182.5 (7.19)	160.4 (6.31)	158.9 (6.26)	134.9 (5.31)	208.5 (8.21)	207.2 (8.16)	184.5 (7.26)	109.2 (4.30)	1,698.1 (66.85)
Average precipitation days (≥ 1.0 mm)	16	15	19	22	24	21	21	20	23	23	23	19	241
Average relative humidity (%)	91	91	91	91	91	91	91	91	92	92	91	92	91
Mean monthly sunshine hours	164.3	141.2	124.0	108.0	117.8	117.0	139.5	145.7	114.0	117.8	120.0	139.5	1,548.8
Mean daily sunshine hours	5.3	5.0	4.0	3.6	3.8	3.9	4.5	4.7	3.8	3.8	4.0	4.5	4.2
Source: Instituto de Hidrologia Meteorologia y Estudios Ambientales
