= Pueblorrico =

- Municipality and town
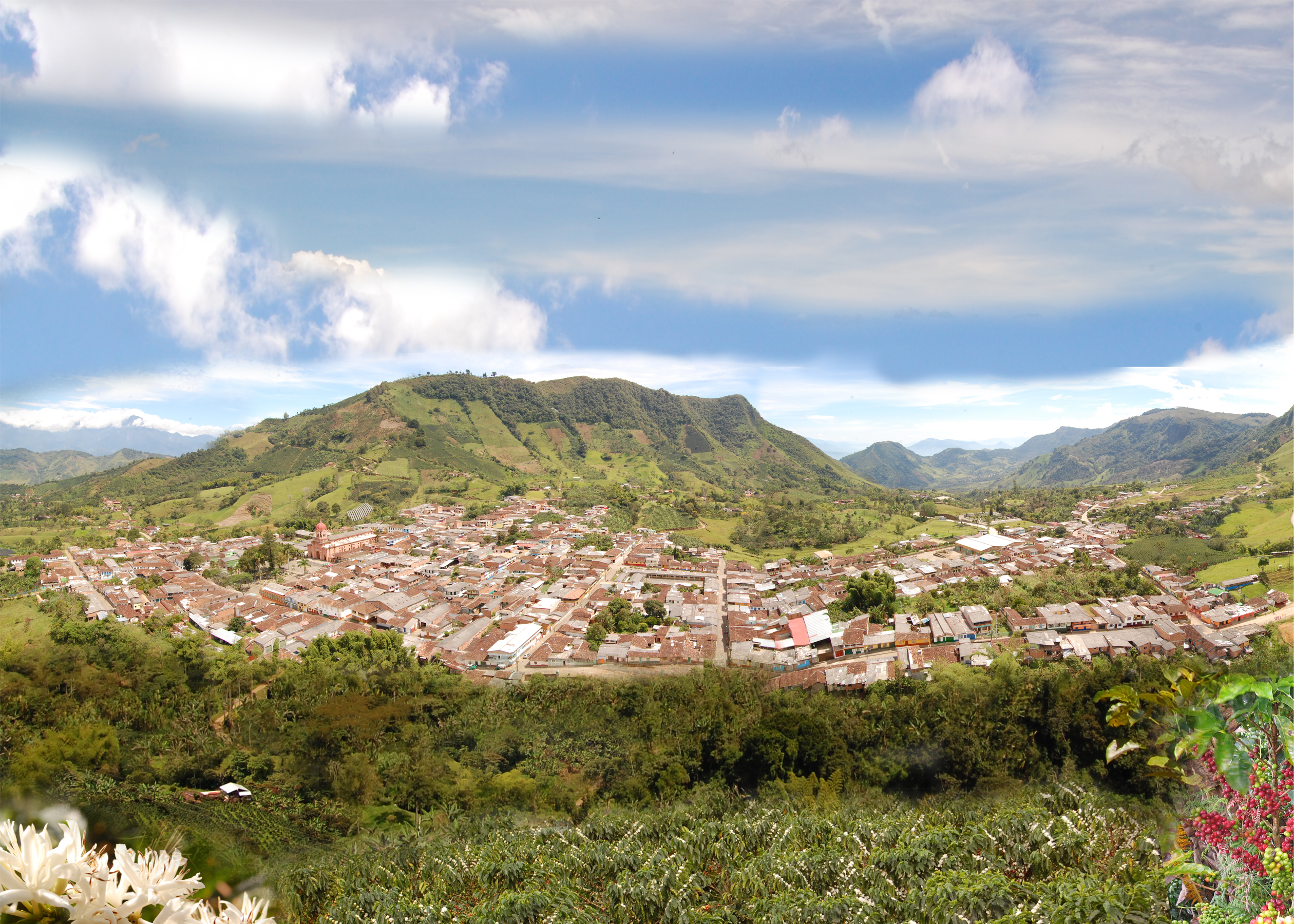

- Flag Coat of arms

- Location of the municipality and town of Pueblorrico in the Antioquia Department of Colombia

- Location in Colombia
- Coordinates: 5°47′26″N 75°50′26″W
- Country: Colombia
- Department: Antioquia Department
- Subregion: Southwestern

Population (2018)
  - Municipality and town: 8,664
  - Urban: 4,450
- Time zone: UTC-5 (Colombia Standard Time)

Pueblorrico is a municipality in Colombia, located in the southwest subregion of the Department of Antioquia. It borders the municipalities of Salgar and Tarso to the north, Jericó to the east, Andes to the south, and Ciudad Bolívar and Hispania to the west.

== History ==
In 1540, a Spanish lieutenant from the conquering troop of Marshal Jorge Robledo was tasked with exploring the territories along the Cauca River, starting from the city of Arma towards the north. This expedition explored a large area of what is now known as Southwest Antioquia, including the lands of present-day Pueblorrico.

In 1825, a group of settlers from the city of Medellín, led by Gabriel Echeverri, offered to purchase vast lands in this area from the government, successfully negotiating the transaction. Subsequently, another settler named Santiago Santamaría inherited the land.

Around 1869, the locality was designated as a corregimiento (subdivision) and later, in 1907, as a parish.

In 1911, it separated from the municipality of Jericó and was designated as a municipal fraction. Despite attempts to rename the district, the name Pueblorrico persisted through generations, apparently because the first Spanish conquerors who set foot on the land found indigenous people with considerable amounts of gold and named it accordingly.

Pueblorrico boasts beautiful landscapes, several picturesque streams, and access to a natural reserve.

== General Information ==
- Discoverers: Spanish troops of Jorge Robledo.
- Foundation: October 3, 1866.
- Municipal status: March 16, 1911.
- Founders: Settlers.
- Nickname: Sweet Municipality and Peaceful Haven of Southwest Antioquia.

=== Districts ===
The municipality has 22 districts, which are:

- Barcino
- California
- Cascabelito
- Castalia
- Corinto A
- Corinto B
- El Cedrón
- Hoyo Grande
- La Berrío
- La Envidia
- La Gómez
- La Pica
- La Unión
- Lourdes
- Morrón
- Mulatico
- Mulato
- Patudal
- San Francisco
- Santa Bárbara
- Sevilla
- Sinaí

== Demographics ==
=== Historical Population ===
Year	Population	±%
1912	11,168	—
1938	10,431	−6.6%
1951	10,908	+4.6%
1964	8,634	−20.8%
1973	7,428	−14.0%
1985	9,575	+28.9%
1993	10,420	+8.8%
2005	8,294	−20.4%
2018	8,664	+4.5%

- Total Population: 8,664 (2018)
- Urban Population: 4,450
- Rural Population: 4,214
- Literacy Rate: 83.5% (2005)
- Urban area: 87.4%
- Rural area: 79.6%

=== Ethnography ===
According to the figures presented by DANE from the 2005 census, the ethnic composition of the municipality is:

- Mestizos and Whites: 91.9%
- Blacks: 6.6%
- Indigenous: 1.5%

== Economy ==
- Agriculture: coffee, plantain, cassava, panela, corn, and beans.
- Livestock: cattle, pigs, and horses.
- Commerce: includes the marketing of products from the primary, secondary, and service sectors.

== Festivals ==
- Trapiche and Coffee Festival, first long weekend in June.
- Farmer's Day Fair.
- Youth Home Festival / November Farmer's Festival.

== Points of Interest and Tourism ==
=== Ecological and Natural Destinations ===
- El Salto De Los Monos Waterfall: 15 minutes from the town along the paved road connecting with the neighboring municipality of Tarso, near the chapel of the El Cedrón district, featuring an impressive 80-meter drop.
- La Pirámide Hill: Close to the municipal seat, ideal for reconnecting with nature and rejuvenating, perfect for a picnic. It gets its name from a pyramid-shaped structure located there.
- El Cedrón Valley Indigenous Petroglyph: Located in the El Cedrón district, this symbolic design carved into rock by indigenous peoples in ancient times is the only one identified in the entire municipality.
- La Trocha Ecological Reserve: A cloud forest with a great diversity of flora and fauna, suitable for bird watching and hiking with trails of varying difficulty.

=== Religious and Pilgrimage Sites ===
- El Gólgota Hill: The town's guardian hill, a pilgrimage site offering visibility of 60% of the nearby Southwest from its summit, located 50 minutes from the municipal seat.
- Cristo Rey Hill: Suitable for slow tourism, providing a view of the entire municipal seat, with a monument honoring Cristo Rey.
- El Asomadero: A pilgrimage point with a monument honoring the Virgin of Carmen, patron saint of drivers in Colombia and Venezuela, and one of the most revered advocations among the people of Pueblorrico.
- San Antonio de Padua Parish Church: Construction began in 1931 and completed in 1965, featuring three naves, with the tower and belfry over the central one.

=== Urban and Historical Points of Interest ===
- Joaquín López Gaviria Cultural House: Named after the town's founder, it is a cultural and artistic reference for the municipality, housing various arts schools.
- "100 Years of Pueblorrico" Mural: A mural carved into a ravine representing different economic factors of the municipality, notable figures, and tourist sites, created by local artist William Peláez Agudelo for the centennial celebration of Pueblorrico's establishment as a municipality in 1911.
- Historical Museum and Municipal Library: Displays ancient and classic pieces narrating the history, culture, and traditions of Pueblorrico. The municipal library offers a large collection of historical and educational books for the community. The museum is part of the Antioquia Museum Network.
- Simón Bolívar Main Park: A park that provides a modern look to the municipality while preserving its tradition, featuring a statue honoring “The Mule Driver.”
- Jairo Alberto Gallego Sports Complex: A recreational and sports center with a micro-soccer field, covered coliseum, soccer stadium, outdoor gym, children's playground, children's pool, and semi-Olympic pool.
