= Aguadas, Caldas =

- Municipality and town
- Flag Coat of arms

- Location of the municipality and town of Aguadas, Caldas in the Caldas Department of Colombia.

- Location in Colombia
- Coordinates: 5°37′0″N 75°28′0″W
- Country: Colombia
- Department: Caldas Department

Population (Census 2018)
  - Total: 20,712
- Time zone: UTC-5 (Colombia Standard Time)

Aguadas is a town and municipality in the Colombian department of Caldas. It is bordered to the north by Abejorral, to the east by Sonsón, to the southeast by Salamina, to the south by Pacora, to the west by Caramanta and Valparaiso, and to the northwest by La Pintada. The municipality of Aguadas, located in the northern part of the department, was founded in 1808 by José Narciso Estrada. In addition to the fame of Aguadeño hats (sombrero aguadeño), which are very similar to palm-straw Panama hats (also known as iraca in Colombia). Aguadas offers visitors its historic center, which was declared a national monument in 1982. It has a temperate climate thanks to the variety of climates ranging from warm to moor.

Another of its main attractions is the National Festival of the Colombian Pasillo (Festival Nacional del Pasillo Colombiano), an annual event that has earned recognition for Aguadas as the capital of the Colombian Pasillo.

Located along the Colombian coffee growing axis, the historic center of Aguadas was made part of the "Coffee Cultural Landscape" UNESCO World Heritage Site in 2011.

== History ==
It was the Coucuyes Indians who inhabited the land now called Aguadas when the conquistadors arrived. These Indians were baptized with the name of Armados (Spanish for armed) apparently based on the outfits they wore.

Marshal Jorge Robledo was one of the first Spaniards to visit these lands. Sebastián de Belalcázar, his commanding officer, had ordered him to found a town as a military fort named Santiago de Arma (1542). Gold deposits were found in the area which attracted many families. The subsequent depletion of the ore led to the abandonment of the region, and finally the authorities ordered the transfer of Arma to the town of Rionegro. However, many villagers refused to leave the village, and in 1808 decided to found Aguadas in response to the massive influx of settlers from Antioquia.

Aguadas is therefore the current name of the legendary Spanish town of Santiago de Arma.

One of the places of arrival for immigrants moving south from Antioquia was said to be the inn run by Manuela Ocampo, where the muleteers were given lodging.

The town is bathed by the rivers of the Arma and Cauca. Down through history the town has been called: Ciudad de Ebejico, ciudad de las brumas, la Aguada, and finally Aguadas, which is the present name.

Aguadas was declared a Pueblo Patrimonio (heritage town) of Colombia in 2012. It is the second municipality in Caldas to be awarded this distinction.

== Climate ==
Aguadas has a subtropical highland climate (Cfb) with heavy to very heavy rainfall year-round.

Climate data for Aguadas (Pelada La), elevation 2,180 m (7,150 ft), (1981–2010)
Month	Jan	Feb	Mar	Apr	May	Jun	Jul	Aug	Sep	Oct	Nov	Dec	Year
Mean daily maximum °C (°F)	21.4 (70.5)	21.8 (71.2)	21.9 (71.4)	21.7 (71.1)	21.5 (70.7)	21.7 (71.1)	22.1 (71.8)	21.9 (71.4)	21.5 (70.7)	20.7 (69.3)	20.4 (68.7)	20.7 (69.3)	21.5 (70.7)
Daily mean °C (°F)	16.7 (62.1)	17.0 (62.6)	16.8 (62.2)	16.8 (62.2)	16.8 (62.2)	16.8 (62.2)	17.1 (62.8)	17.1 (62.8)	16.7 (62.1)	16.3 (61.3)	16.1 (61.0)	16.3 (61.3)	16.7 (62.1)
Mean daily minimum °C (°F)	12.0 (53.6)	12.1 (53.8)	12.3 (54.1)	12.2 (54.0)	12.5 (54.5)	12.5 (54.5)	12.2 (54.0)	12.1 (53.8)	12.3 (54.1)	12.3 (54.1)	12.4 (54.3)	12.2 (54.0)	12.3 (54.1)
Average precipitation mm (inches)	89.3 (3.52)	127.8 (5.03)	165.7 (6.52)	195.7 (7.70)	240.0 (9.45)	181.0 (7.13)	164.6 (6.48)	135.5 (5.33)	189.6 (7.46)	212.8 (8.38)	195.8 (7.71)	121.5 (4.78)	2,019.4 (79.50)
Average precipitation days	13	14	18	21	21	19	16	15	19	21	19	15	212
Average relative humidity (%)	79	79	81	83	84	83	78	77	81	84	86	83	82
Source: Instituto de Hidrologia Meteorologia y Estudios Ambientales
