= Norte Caldense Subregion =

Northern District Distrito Norte
- District
- Country: Colombia
- Department: Caldas
- Time zone: UTC−5 (COT)

The Northern District is a subregion of the Colombian Department of Caldas.

- Aguadas
- Aranzazu
- Pacora
- Salamina
