= Ciudad Bolívar (disambiguation) =

Ciudad Bolívar is the capital of Bolívar State, Venezuela.

Ciudad Bolívar may also refer to:

- Ciudad Bolívar, Antioquia, town and municipality in Antioquia Department, Colombia
- Ciudad Bolívar, Bogotá, locality in the Capital District of Bogotá, Colombia
- Club Ciudad de Bolívar, Argentine volleyball club based in San Carlos de Bolívar
- Trujillo, Peru, known under the name from 1825 to 1827
