= Betulia =

Betulia can refer to:

- The biblical city of Bethulia, alias Betuloua
- Betulia, Antioquia in Colombia
- Betulia, Santander in Colombia
- 1580 Betulia (provisional designation: 1950 KA), an Amor asteroid discovered on May 22, 1950
- The opera by Pietro Metastasio (see also Mozart's Oratorio Betulia Liberata, K. 118 - 74c)

== See also ==
- Betula
- Betuliad
