= Angelópolis =

- Municipality and town
- Flag

- Location of the municipality and town of Angelópolis in the Antioquia Department of Colombia

- Location in Colombia
- Coordinates: 6°08′N 75°42′W
- Country: Colombia
- Department: Antioquia Department
- Subregion: Southwestern

Area
  - Total: 86 km^{2} (33 sq mi)
- Elevation: 1,950 m (6,400 ft)

Population (2015)
  - Total: 8,946
  - Density: 100/km^{2} (270/sq mi)
- Time zone: UTC-5 (Colombia Standard Time)

Angelópolis (Spanish pronunciation: [aŋxeˈlopolis]) is a town and municipality in Antioquia Department, Colombia. It borders the municipalities of Armenia, Heliconia, and Medellín to the north; La Estrella and Caldas to the east; Amagá to the south; and Titiribí and Armenia to the west. Its municipal seat is 48 kilometers from the city of Medellín, the capital of the department of Antioquia. The municipality has an area of 86 square kilometers.

== History ==
The priest Joaquín María Giraldo is considered the first pioneer of the region and the original founder of the town. After the first settlements were established, something very similar to what happened in the rest of southwestern Antioquia happened with this community: the search for gold.

After the gold rush, settlers arrived in the region until, in 1887, a pair of them, the brothers Joaquín and Petrona Franco, decided to build a chapel on a mountainous ridge they called "Los Ángeles." They were accompanied by the aforementioned Father Joaquín María Giraldo, who would become an icon of the population and who proposed the name "Angelópolis" for the recent foundation. The name stayed forever.

Angelópolis acquired the status of a district in 1896 and remains so to this day.

Its name continues to mean 'City of Angels,' and it is located just 48 km from Medellín. It is a small town and is next to the majestic El Romeral natural reserve, which serves as a natural boundary with the municipality of La Estrella. This area, of immense value in ecotourism, attracts more and more ecotourists and hikers, and is the cradle of several rivers, and is home to many species of flora and fauna.

== General information ==
- Foundation: June 16, 1887
- Municipality status: Ordinance 16 of July 13, 1896
- Founders: Joaquín María Giraldo, Brothers Joaquín and Petrona Franco
- Nickname: "Land of the Angels"

== Geography ==
It is connected by road to the municipalities of Heliconia, La Estrella, Caldas, Amagá, Titiribí, Armenia, and Medellín. It was named Angelópolis by the aforementioned Father Joaquín María Giraldo, who is also considered one of the first founders. The patron saints of the population are the Holy Angels, hence its name.

=== Climate ===
- Maximum temperature: 23 °C
- Minimum temperature: 18 °C

== Political-Administrative Division ==
Besides its municipal seat, Angelópolis has jurisdiction over the following populated centers:

- Corregimiento La Estación
- Vereda Cienaguita
- Vereda Santa Rita
- Vereda San Isidro
- Vereda La Cascajala
- Vereda Promisión
- Vereda La Clara
- Vereda El Barro
- Vereda El Nudillo
- Vereda Santa Bárbara

== Demographics ==
Historical population
Year	Pop.	±%
1912	3,578	—
1918	4,117	+15.1%
1938	4,936	+19.9%
1951	5,315	+7.7%
1964	6,309	+18.7%
1973	6,135	−2.8%
1985	6,100	−0.6%
1993	6,479	+6.2%
2005	7,641	+17.9%
2018	9,180	+20.1%

=== Historical Population ===
- 1912: 3,578: —
- 1918: 4,117: +15.1%
- 1938: 4,936: +19.9%
- 1951: 5,315: +7.7%
- 1964: 6,309: +18.7%
- 1973: 6,135: −2.8%
- 1985: 6,100: −0.6%
- 1993: 6,479: +6.2%
- 2005: 7,641: +17.9%
- 2018: 9,180: +20.1%

Total Population: 9,180 inhabitants (2018)

- Urban Population: 7,168
- Rural Population: 2,012
- Literacy Rate: 78.7% (2005)
- Urban Area: 77.4%
- Rural Area: 80.5%

Life Expectancy:

- Men: 70 years
- Women: 77 years

==== Ethnography ====
According to figures presented by DANE from the 2005 census, the ethnographic composition of the municipality is:

- Mestizos & Whites: 99.8%
- Afro-Colombians: 0.1%
- Indigenous: 0.1%

== Public transport ==
Buses and minivans: The municipality of Angelópolis has an inter-municipal bus and minivan system that connects the municipality with Medellín and also offers services to the municipality of Caldas.

== Economy ==
Angelópolis is a mining and, notably, coal-producing land. It also has economic activities in agriculture, livestock, and commerce.

- Mining: coal, sand, clay, magnesium
- Agriculture: coffee, sugarcane, plantains
- Livestock: cattle and pigs
- Handicraft Industry: manufacturing of saddles and tack for horses and mules.

== Festivals ==
- Mineral Festival, December 7 to 9
- Festival of the Virgin of Carmen on July 16
- San Isidro Festival in July

== Gastronomy ==
Angelópolis mainly offers typical Antioquian food, such as the famous Bandeja paisa, as well as barbecues.

== Places of interest ==
- Alto del Romeral, an official ecological reserve, a wooded area of 900 hectares located on the borders with the Antioquian municipalities of Caldas and La Estrella, and with a corregimiento of Medellín named San Antonio de Prado
- Quebrada La Ramírez, with its waterfalls, in the sector of El Matadero
- Ecological Trails with abundant forests rich in flora and fauna: the Angelópolis - Caldas route stands out
- Coal Mines
- Parochial Church of the Holy Angels
- Warehouses of the old Antioquia Railway

== See also ==
- Municipalities of Colombia
