= 2015 Colombian landslide =

2015 natural disaster in Salgar, Antioquia, Colombia

2015 Salgar landslide
- Salgar (shaded bright red) in the Antioquia Department of Colombia
- Date: 18 May 2015
- Time: 3:00 am local time
- Location: Salgar, Antioquia Department, Colombia; 5.961667°N 75.975278°W
- Type: Landslide
- Cause: Flooding from heavy rain
- Deaths: 83
- Injuries: 37
- Property damage: 146 houses destroyed

The 2015 Salgar landslide was a landslide that struck the municipality of Salgar in Colombia on May 18, 2015. The landside was triggered by heavy rains that fell on the watershed of the Libordiana stream, and resulted in around 100 deaths and the destruction of portions of the residential area of Salgar. While the government of Colombia and several international agencies provided aid to the area following the landslide, the long-term efforts to restore the area to its pre-landslide state have been the subject of sociological study to determine its effectiveness in reducing the vulnerability of the area to such a disaster.

== Background ==
Colombia's rugged terrain and seismic activity make the country susceptible to natural disasters. From 1975 to 2015, there were about 150 serious disasters, which killed a total of 32,000 people. Flooding in the mountains is not uncommon, and occasionally leads to serious landslides. From 2010 to 2011, a series of floods and landslides killed 1,374 people and destroyed more than 100,000 homes.

== Environmental context ==
The disaster was caused by extreme rainfall that fell on the already steep terrain of the Andes mountains, leading to a “monumental” outpouring of debris and mud. The land is naturally predisposed to these types of events in the Libordiana watershed. Therefore, the geological elements of the area, combined with the lack of early warning systems for authorities in the area, led to the high casualty rate during this flood event.

== Landslide ==
On May 18, 2015 a landslide occurred in La Libordiana region of Colombia. At around 3 a.m., the landslide went through the Salgar municipality in Antioquia Department. The landslide occurred after days of rain in the mountains above the town. The Libordiana River, a tributary of the Cauca River that runs through Salgar, then flooded upstream and triggered the landslide. The imminent danger was not apparent since the flooding occurred in a forested region where few people live.

A survivor remarked: "People were just screaming everywhere, and I ran to help, but the river was impassable, and all the bridges were covered." Another said "We ran outside to the road and went into the chapel, and the lights went out and we were in the dark. Then we looked with flashlights and saw that everything was gone." The force of the landslide destroyed houses and ripped limbs from victims' bodies. According to Salgar mayor Olga Eugenia Osorio, the town of Santa Margarita, one of four towns that lies within the Salgar municipality, was "erased from the map."

== Aftermath ==
At least 78 people were killed by the landslide. Victims were found as far as 100 kilometres (62 mi) from the disaster site as the landslide carried bodies down river. An addition 37 people were injured and as of May 20, 2015, an unknown number of people were still unaccounted for. Dozens of houses and other buildings, including a grade school, remained buried. In total, around 500 people were directly affected by the landslide.

The landslide left many bodies disfigured, complicating identification. Remains recovered from the debris had to be transported to Medellín for identification, three hours from the disaster site. President Juan Manuel Santos flew to the region to oversee rescue efforts personally. He promised government assistance of around $6,500 per person to help rebuild Salgar, and declared it a public calamity. People left homeless by the disaster were provided with food and blankets, as survivors were ordered not to return to the town immediately in case of additional landslides. At least 15 trucks of portable drinking water were brought into Salgar. The public was asked to refrain from sending physical donations for disaster relief, but monetary donations were accepted. The Colombian National Unit for Disaster Risk Management (UNGRD) was assisted by the UN Office for the Coordination of Humanitarian Affairs (OCHA) to deliver emergency aid. The emergency shelter would be established for the hundreds of displaced families, and essential services would be restored. However, the roads were impassable for the search and rescue teams as a result of the debris.

== Social recovery ==
Following the flood, the government created a recovery plan focused on housing. Although this plan provided housing for the survivors of the event, the social fabric of the community was neglected. Many survivors experienced challenges following the resettlement, as they did not have the same opportunities for employment or community bonds in these areas as they had before the flood.
