= Southwestern Antioquia =

Location of the Southwestern Antioquia region within the Antioquia Department.

Southwestern Antioquia is a subregion in the Colombian Department of Antioquia. The region is made up of 24 municipalities and is part of the Colombian Coffee Region.

== Municipalities ==
- Amagá
- Andes
- Angelópolis
- Betania
- Betulia
- Caicedo
- Caramanta
- Ciudad Bolívar
- Concordia
- Fredonia
- Hispania
- Jardín
- Jericó
- La Pintada
- Montebello
- Pueblorrico
- Salgar
- Santa Bárbara
- Támesis
- Tarso
- Titiribí
- Urrao
- Valparaíso
- Venecia
