= Abejorral =

- Municipality and town
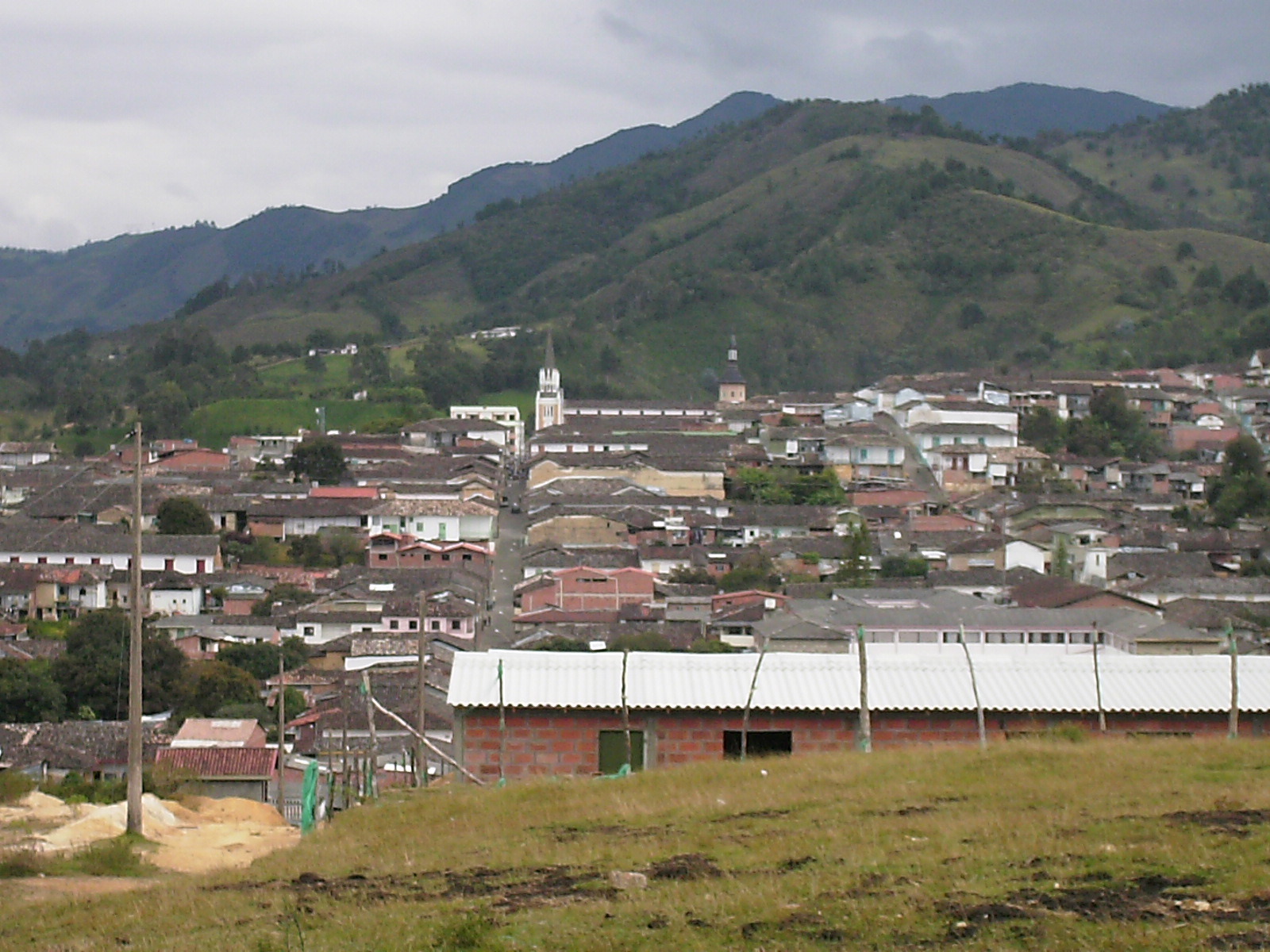
- View of Abejorral

- Flag Coat of arms

- Location of the municipality of Abejorral in the Antioquia Department

- Location in Colombia
- Coordinates: 5°47′22″N 75°25′41″W
- Country: Colombia
- Region: Andean Region
- Department: Antioquia Department
- Subregion: Eastern
- Elevation: 2,275 m (7,464 ft)

Population (Census 2018)
  - Total: 17,599
- Climate: Cfb
- Website: http://www.abejorral-antioquia.gov.co/

Abejorral is a town and municipality in Antioquia Department, Colombia. Part of the subregion of Eastern Antioquia. It borders to the north with the municipalities of Montebello, La Ceja and La Unión, to the east with municipality of Sonsón, to the south with the department of Caldas and to the west with the municipalities of Santa Bárbara y Montebello. The population was 17,599 at the 2018 census.

It was founded in 1805 by José Antonio Villegas, although some believe it was in 1811. The latter was the year when the titles of the land were officially donated to the then existing residents.

Abejorral is one of the oldest municipalities in the Antioquia Subdivision and Colombia. It is known for its colonial times homes which are part of the Historical National Registry. Its topography is ideal for hiking and cycling activities with panoramic views of river and valleys; some of them will provide beautiful conditions for wild camping specially along the Arma River or the Aures River. Abejorral has some touristic features like "La Casa en el Aire" and the "Aures River Waterfall".

== Sites of interest ==
Most of the town is a historical site; the architecture that has survived through the years gives Abejorral the aspect of a city "suspended" in the colonial era, which is the reason that a part of the municipality was declared National monument. Sites of interest include:

- Nuestra Señora del Carmen parish church.
- Nuestra Señora de los Dolores chapel.
- Hospital chapel.
- Municipal Cemetery.
- The Ancient Presbytery (Antigua Casa Cural).
- The founder's house (Casa del fundador).
- The Orange House (La Casa Naranjada).

== Climate ==
Abejorral has a subtropical highland climate (Cfb) with cool and rainy weather year-round.

Climate data for Abejorral
Month	Jan	Feb	Mar	Apr	May	Jun	Jul	Aug	Sep	Oct	Nov	Dec	Year
Mean daily maximum °C (°F)	20.4 (68.7)	20.6 (69.1)	20.9 (69.6)	20.2 (68.4)	20.3 (68.5)	20.7 (69.3)	20.7 (69.3)	20.7 (69.3)	20.6 (69.1)	19.8 (67.6)	19.9 (67.8)	19.8 (67.6)	20.4 (68.7)
Daily mean °C (°F)	16.4 (61.5)	16.5 (61.7)	16.8 (62.2)	16.4 (61.5)	16.6 (61.9)	16.8 (62.2)	16.5 (61.7)	16.6 (61.9)	16.4 (61.5)	16.0 (60.8)	16.1 (61.0)	16.1 (61.0)	16.4 (61.6)
Mean daily minimum °C (°F)	12.4 (54.3)	12.5 (54.5)	12.8 (55.0)	12.7 (54.9)	13.0 (55.4)	12.9 (55.2)	12.4 (54.3)	12.5 (54.5)	12.2 (54.0)	12.3 (54.1)	12.3 (54.1)	12.4 (54.3)	12.5 (54.6)
Average precipitation mm (inches)	105 (4.1)	113 (4.4)	177 (7.0)	252 (9.9)	276 (10.9)	177 (7.0)	146 (5.7)	207 (8.1)	273 (10.7)	312 (12.3)	276 (10.9)	169 (6.7)	2,483 (97.7)
Source: climate-data.org
