= La Pintada, Antioquia =

La Pintada
- Municipality and town
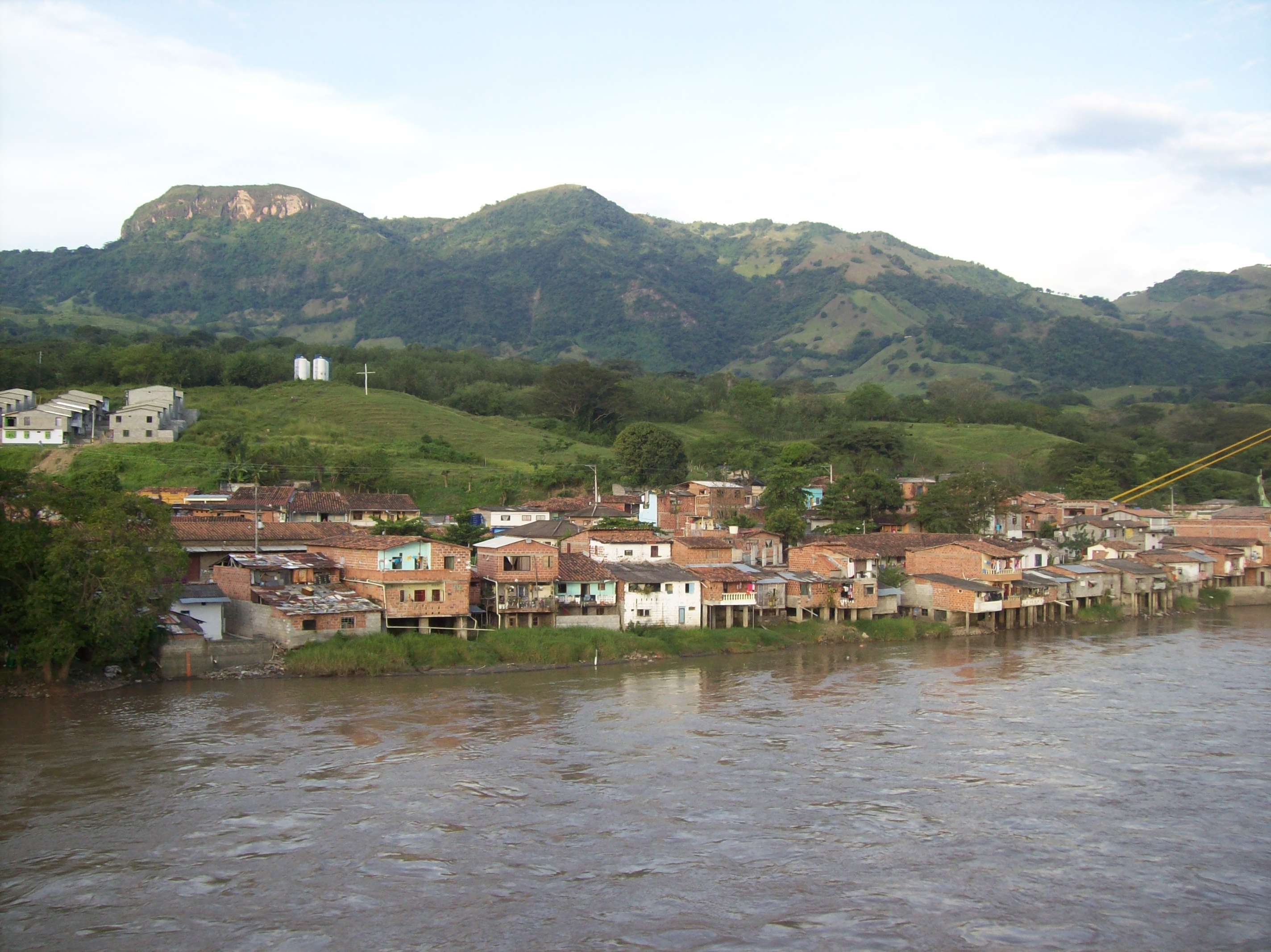

- Flag

- Location of the municipality and town of La Pintada in the Antioquia Department of Colombia

- Location in Colombia
- Coordinates: 5°44′31″N 75°36′19″W
- Country: Colombia
- Department: Antioquia Department
- Subregion: Southwestern
- Elevation: 600 m (2,000 ft)
- Time zone: UTC-5 (Colombia Standard Time)

La Pintada (Spanish pronunciation: [la pinˈtaða]); is a town and municipality in the southwest region of the Antioquia Department of Colombia. It is located 79 miles from Medellín at an altitude of 600 m (2,000 ft) above sea level. It borders the Fredonia and Santa Bárbara municipalities to the north. The Cauca River flows through the municipality.

== Places of interest ==
- Slopes of the Poblanco and Arma rivers
- Yellow hill
- Alejandro López railway station
- El Salto del Caballo
- Acapulco beach

== Gallery ==
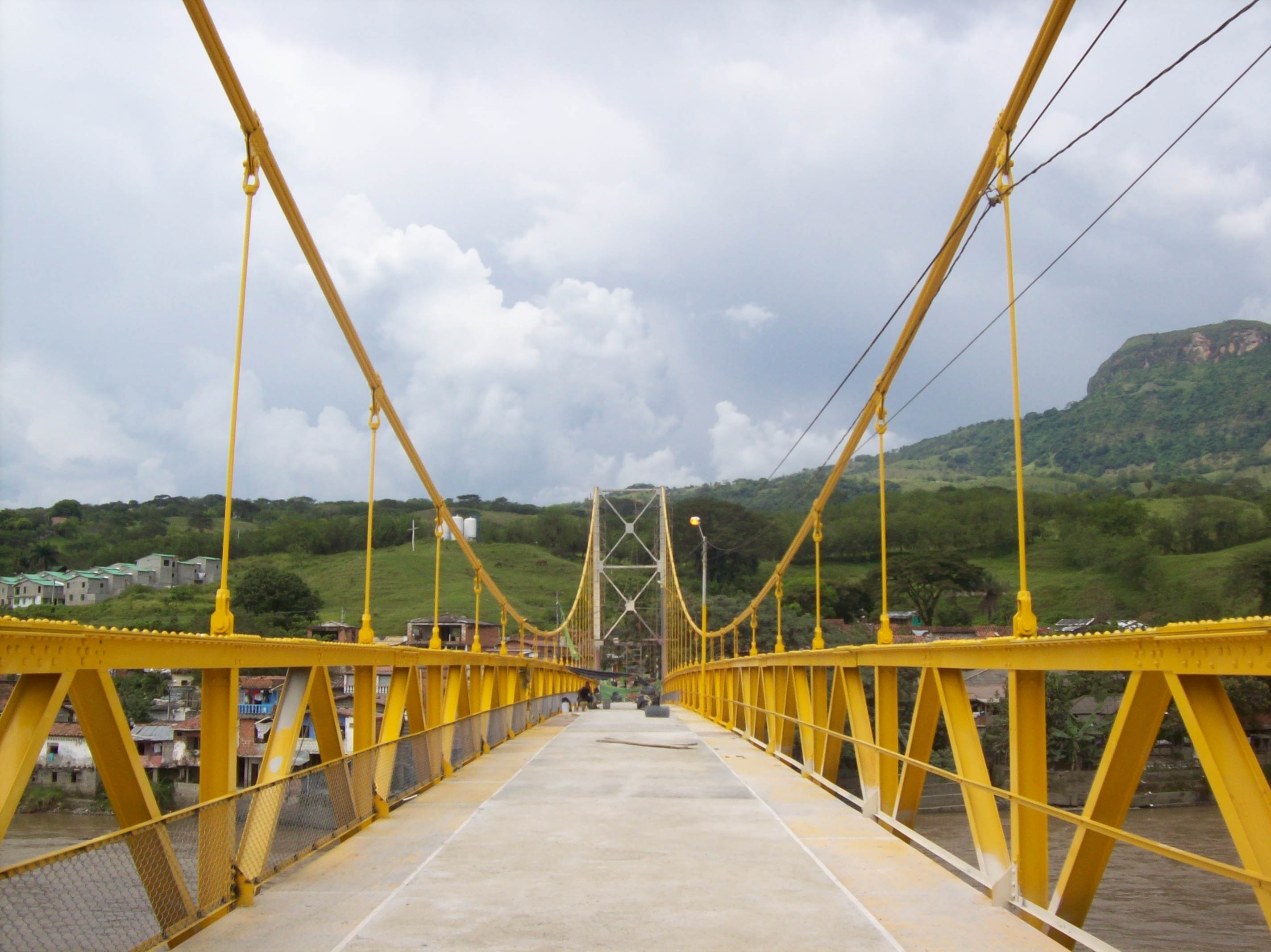
