= Abriaquí =

- Municipality and town
- Flag

- Location of the municipality and town of Abriaquí in the Antioquia Department of Colombia

- Location in Colombia
- Coordinates: 6°38′N 76°04′W
- Country: Colombia
- Department: Antioquia Department
- Subregion: Western

Area
  - Total: 290 km^{2} (110 sq mi)

Population (2002)
  - Total: 4,200
- Time zone: UTC-5 (Colombia Standard Time)

Abriaquí is a town and municipality in Antioquia Department, Colombia. Its population was 4,200 in 2002.

== Climate ==
Abriaquí has a subtropical highland climate (Cfb) with heavy rainfall year-round.

Climate data for Abriaquí
Month	Jan	Feb	Mar	Apr	May	Jun	Jul	Aug	Sep	Oct	Nov	Dec	Year
Mean daily maximum °C (°F)	23.3 (73.9)	23.8 (74.8)	24.2 (75.6)	24.0 (75.2)	23.2 (73.8)	23.1 (73.6)	23.7 (74.7)	23.3 (73.9)	22.7 (72.9)	22.3 (72.1)	22.3 (72.1)	22.9 (73.2)	23.2 (73.8)
Daily mean °C (°F)	17.9 (64.2)	18.3 (64.9)	18.8 (65.8)	18.9 (66.0)	18.4 (65.1)	18.3 (64.9)	18.4 (65.1)	18.1 (64.6)	17.8 (64.0)	17.8 (64.0)	17.6 (63.7)	17.7 (63.9)	18.2 (64.7)
Mean daily minimum °C (°F)	12.6 (54.7)	12.9 (55.2)	13.5 (56.3)	13.8 (56.8)	13.7 (56.7)	13.5 (56.3)	13.2 (55.8)	13.0 (55.4)	13.0 (55.4)	13.3 (55.9)	13.0 (55.4)	12.5 (54.5)	13.2 (55.7)
Average rainfall mm (inches)	92.4 (3.64)	108.7 (4.28)	151.1 (5.95)	240.9 (9.48)	261.9 (10.31)	187.4 (7.38)	141.5 (5.57)	160.8 (6.33)	218.1 (8.59)	270.0 (10.63)	235.0 (9.25)	153.8 (6.06)	2,221.6 (87.47)
Average rainy days	11	12	16	21	22	17	15	16	20	24	22	15	211
Source 1: IDEAM
Source 2: Climate-Data.org
