= Pácora, Caldas =

Pácora
- Municipality and town
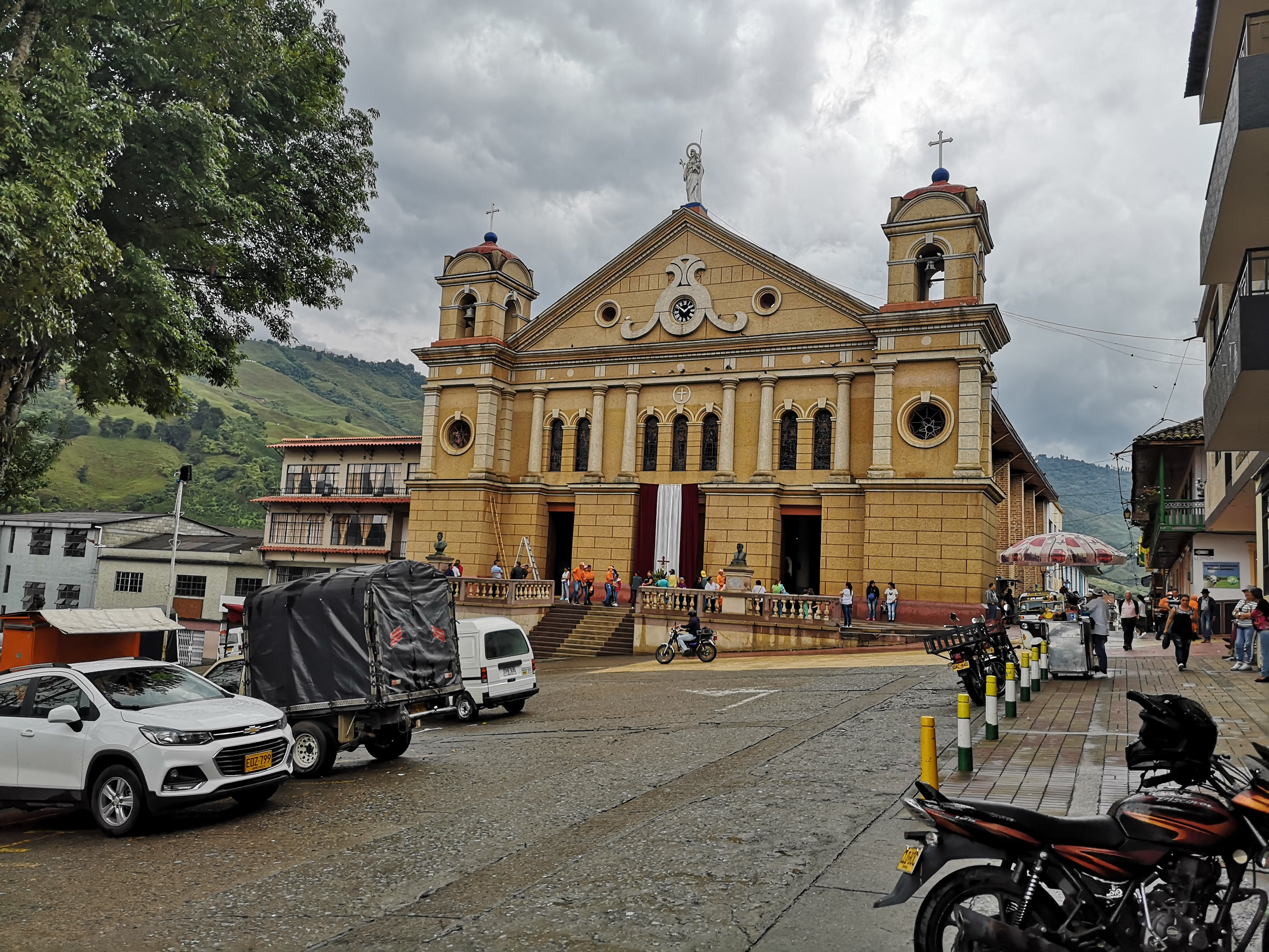
- Church of Saint Joseph

- Flag Coat of arms

- Location of the municipality and town of Pácora in the Caldas Department of Colombia

- Location in Colombia
- Coordinates: 05°31′33″N 75°27′32″W
- Country: Colombia
- Department: Caldas Department
- Founded: 1831

Area
  - Total: 234 km^{2} (90 sq mi)
- Elevation: 1,819 m (5,968 ft)

Population (Census 2018)
  - Total: 13,214
  - Density: 56.5/km^{2} (146/sq mi)
- Time zone: UTC-5 (Colombia Standard Time)
- Website: Official website

Pácora is a town and municipality in the Colombian Department of Caldas. It is located in northern Caldas-Department, on the slopes of the Andes Central Mountains of the Republic of Colombia. With an average annual temperature of 18 °C, the town is bordered to the northeast with Aguadas, Caldas, to the south with Salamina, Caldas and La Merced, and to the west separated by the Cauca River, Marmato-Caldas and Caramanta-Antioquia department. The villages in Pácora are San Bartolomé, Castilla, Las Coles, Los Morros, San Lorenzo and Buenos Aires.

== History ==
The Quimbaya civilization (Pozos, Armas and Paucuras), were the region native Indians whom Mariscal Jorge Robledo found at the time of the Spanish conquest. When Robledo fought against them, he saw the natives wearing gold bracelets, rings and necklaces. Robledo, looking for fortune and riches, chased them down, but before reaching the creek of Pácora, they disappeared into the jungle. Pácora has an important historical site, the Stone-Cave of Pipintá, located in Loma de Pozo at 1500 meters above sea level. It consists of a huge rock that hides the entrances to the cave used by the Pozos as a trade route with the neighboring towns of Arma and the gold-mining town of Marmato, Caldas. At the Village of San Bartolome, the Pimaraque bar preserve wall murals representing the history of the Pozo Indians, the Stone-Cave of Pipinta and the fate of Marshal Jorge Robledo.

Jorge Robledo (conquistador) was born in Úbeda, Jaén, (Andalucía) Spain at the start of the 16th century. He came to Americas in an expedition organized by Pedro de alvarado, who left Sanlúcar de Barrameda in early 1528. As a Conquistador of Antioquia, Jorge Robledo founded the towns of Anserma in 1539, Cartago, Valle del Cauca in 1540 and Santa Fe de Antioquia in 1541. On July 25 of 1542 with orders from Sebastian de Belalcazar, Captain Miguel Lopez Munoz founded the Ville of Santiago de Arma. On October 2, 1546, the Governor of Popayán, Sebastián de Belalcázar ordered the execution of Robledo over a dispute of land in Antioquia and on October 5, 1546, Marshal Jorge Robledo died at Loma de Pozo, in the municipality of Pácora.

Antioquia settlers in 1786 invaded the neighboring territories from the Aranzazu Concession. After many issues with the project to transfer the town of Santiago de Arma to the city of Rionegro, settlers founded on December 6, 1831, on the banks of the creek Paucura, a town by the name of Arma Nuevo (present-day Pácora). On October 12, 1832, The Provincial Chamber ruled that the town should be moved to Pacora and to comply with this provision, a total of 1172 inhabitants left for the new town. The initial distribution of land among neighbors was done by Chief Justice and original founder of Pácora, Cornelio Marin.

== Geography ==
Pácora is located in a central forest reserve that runs from Manizales-Caldas to Sonsón-Antioquia, with pine trees at the top of the mountain and several timber species that are found in the region. In terms of fauna, there are 22 families of mammals, a large population of fish, reptiles and amphibians on the banks of the Cauca River. The water sources of the area are diverse and abundant, and includes the Cauca, Pozo, and San Lorenzo Rivers, and the streams of Guarguarabá and La Mica.

== Economy ==
As part of the Colombian Coffee-Growers Axis the main economic activity in Pacora is the cultivation of coffee, which extends up to 4000 hectares. The municipality was made part of the "Coffee Cultural Landscape" UNESCO World Heritage Site in 2011. The sugarcane ranks as the second agricultural product processed in 86 mills. In raising livestock, there are over 9000 herds of cattle, and over 60 ponds and fish farms. Recently they have been promoting the industrialization of powdered sugarcane that is sold in Manizales-Caldas and Medellín-Antioquia.

== Culture ==
Saint Joseph Church is the most important architectural site in town. Built with renaissance, baroque and colonial style, the church facade is ornamented with pilasters, columns and arches and the windows decorated with beautiful stained glass images. The temple bells, called Juana and Maria, were made with 5 pounds of pure gold, silver and bronze in 1893 by a company in Troy, NY.

Bolívar Square is the main square plaza where the town administrative offices are located, the City Hall, the House of Culture, the Saint Joseph Church and the Statue honoring Simón Bolívar the Liberator of Colombia.

The House of Culture, named after the artist Guillermo Botero Gutierrez, is a center in charge of promoting the diverse cultural and artistic activities in town. It houses a museum of Pre-Columbian artifacts, a former photographic record with historical events and population statistics, based on the Deeds Registry from 1832 to 1950, and the legacy of Guillermo Botero.

== Tourism ==
On June 25, 2011, the United Nations Educational, Scientific and Cultural Organization UNESCO World Heritage Site declared The Coffee Cultural Landscape of Colombia a World Heritage Site. The Coffee Cultural Landscape is located in Caldas, Quindío department, Risaralda department and Valle del Cauca department. It includes the urban and rural areas of Pacora and 16 municipalities that are also located in the Department of Caldas. List of World Heritage Sites in the Americas

The first Water Festival took place on 1960 as a special holiday, and since 1989 this festivity occurs every two years on October. Citizens of all ages are expected to visit the monument of Christ the King, to hear Saint Joseph church bells ringing, to taste traditional food and to participate in multiples parades, exhibitions and musical concerts.
