= Hispania, Antioquia =

- Municipality and town
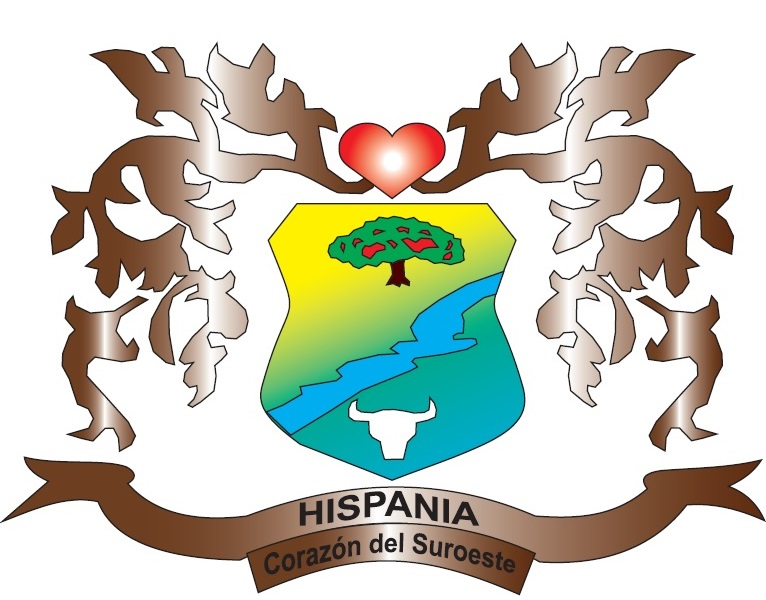
- Flag Coat of arms

- Location of the municipality and town of Hispania, Antioquia in the Antioquia Department of Colombia

- Location in Colombia
- Coordinates: 5°48′10.8″N 75°54′43.2″W
- Country: Colombia
- Department: Antioquia Department
- Subregion: Southwestern
- Time zone: UTC-5 (Colombia Standard Time)

Hispania is a town and municipality in Antioquia Department, Colombia. It is part of the sub-region of Southwestern Antioquia.
