= Anzá =

Anzá, Antioquia
- Municipality and town
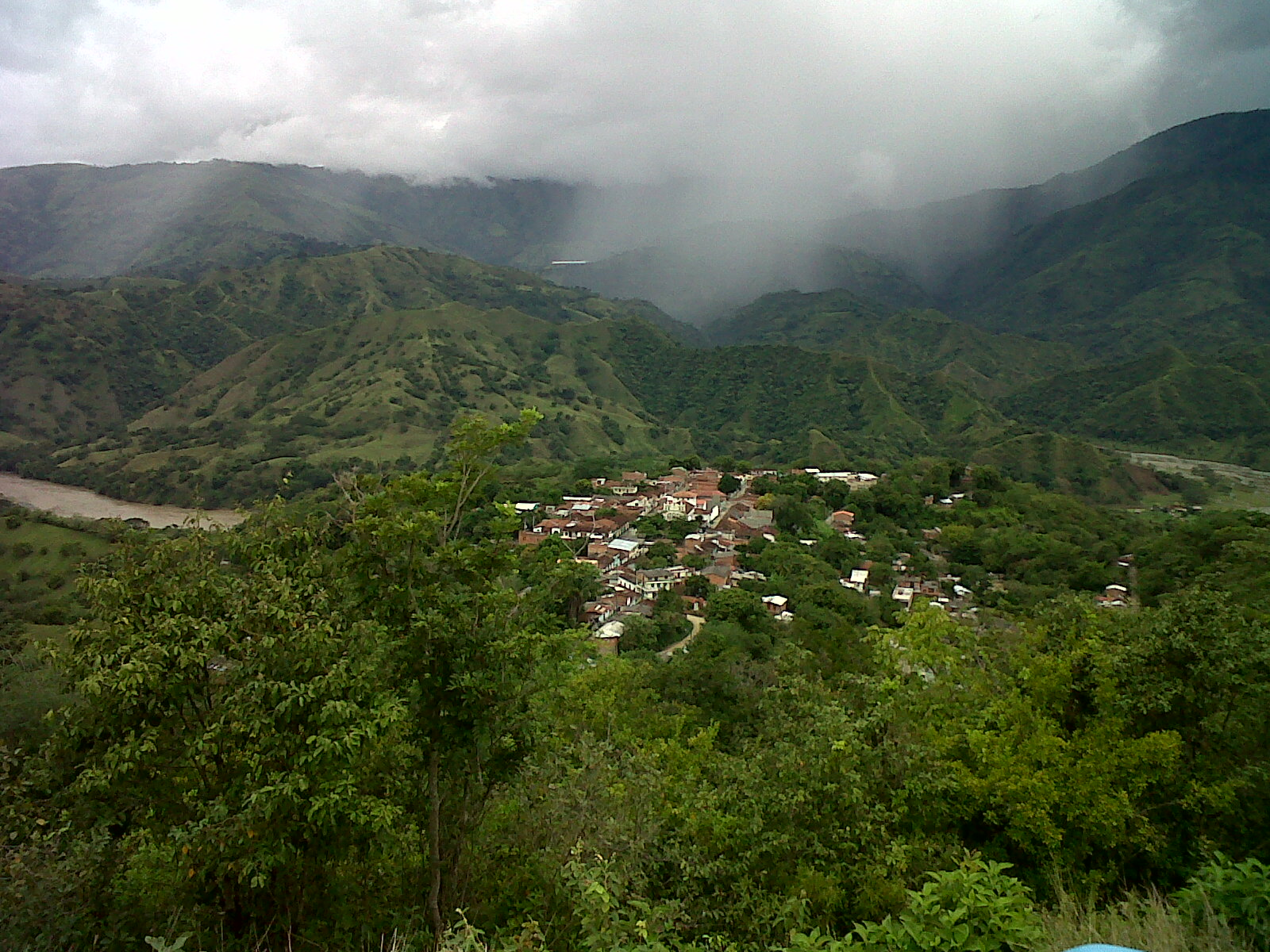

- Flag Coat of arms

- Location of the municipality and town of Anzá, Antioquia in the Antioquia Department of Colombia

- Location in Colombia
- Coordinates: 6°18′N 75°51′W
- Country: Colombia
- Department: Antioquia Department
- Subregion: Western

Area
  - Total: 256 km^{2} (99 sq mi)
- Time zone: UTC-5 (Colombia Standard Time)

Anza (Spanish pronunciation: [anˈsa]) is a town and municipality in Antioquia Department, Colombia. It spans an area of 256 km^{2} (99 sq mi).
