= Concordia, Antioquia =

- Municipality and town
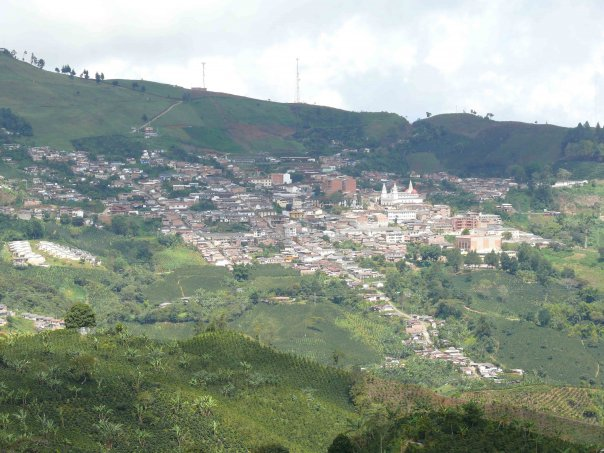

- Flag Coat of arms

- Location of the municipality and town of Concordia, Antioquia in the Antioquia Department of Colombia

- Location in Colombia
- Coordinates: 6°2′56.4″N 75°54′32.4″W
- Country: Colombia
- Department: Antioquia Department
- Subregion: Southwestern

Population (Census 2018)
  - Total: 16,095
- Time zone: UTC-5 (Colombia Standard Time)

Concordia (Spanish pronunciation: [koŋˈkoɾðja]) is a town and municipality in the Colombian department of Antioquia. It is part of the sub-region of Southwestern Antioquia.

This municipality is located at 2,000 meters above sea level At 6° 2'59.82"N 75°55'11.88"W. Has a population of 25,000 including the surrounding areas. The inhabitants of this mountains survives mainly from the coffee trade.

It was founded in 1830 by Juan José Restrepo Uribe, and originally named as Selva Virgen (Virgin Jungle), it was later renamed La Comia.

== Climate ==
Climate data for Concordia, elevation 1,904 m (6,247 ft), (1981–2010)
Month	Jan	Feb	Mar	Apr	May	Jun	Jul	Aug	Sep	Oct	Nov	Dec	Year
Mean daily maximum °C (°F)	23.4 (74.1)	23.9 (75.0)	23.6 (74.5)	23.2 (73.8)	23.0 (73.4)	23.4 (74.1)	23.7 (74.7)	23.9 (75.0)	23.2 (73.8)	22.5 (72.5)	22.4 (72.3)	22.7 (72.9)	23.2 (73.8)
Daily mean °C (°F)	18.5 (65.3)	18.8 (65.8)	18.8 (65.8)	18.6 (65.5)	18.6 (65.5)	18.8 (65.8)	18.9 (66.0)	18.8 (65.8)	18.4 (65.1)	17.9 (64.2)	17.8 (64.0)	18.1 (64.6)	18.5 (65.3)
Mean daily minimum °C (°F)	14.3 (57.7)	14.4 (57.9)	14.4 (57.9)	14.4 (57.9)	14.5 (58.1)	14.5 (58.1)	14.4 (57.9)	14.3 (57.7)	14.0 (57.2)	14.0 (57.2)	14.0 (57.2)	14.2 (57.6)	14.3 (57.7)
Average precipitation mm (inches)	97.8 (3.85)	127.4 (5.02)	171.0 (6.73)	253.7 (9.99)	293.2 (11.54)	227.3 (8.95)	186.4 (7.34)	190.2 (7.49)	243.9 (9.60)	268.8 (10.58)	254.5 (10.02)	145.5 (5.73)	2,459.7 (96.84)
Average precipitation days (≥ 1.0 mm)	8.1	9.7	14.2	16.9	18.9	16.1	14.6	14.6	17.0	19.0	17.6	12.6	179.3
Average relative humidity (%)	81.0	79.6	79.5	82.5	83.4	81.7	78.9	79.2	81.6	83.5	85.3	84.3	81.7
Mean monthly sunshine hours	158.1	146.8	139.5	111.0	127.1	162.0	189.1	170.5	144.0	114.7	108.0	127.1	1,697.9
Mean daily sunshine hours	5.1	5.2	4.5	3.7	4.1	5.4	6.1	5.5	4.8	3.7	3.6	4.1	4.7
Source: Instituto de Hidrologia Meteorologia y Estudios Ambientales
