= Caicedo, Antioquia =

Caicedo
- Municipality and town
- Flag Coat of arms

- Location of the municipality and town of Caicedo in the Antioquia Department of Colombia

- Location in Colombia
- Coordinates: 6°27′N 75°58′W
- Country: Colombia
- Department: Antioquia Department
- Subregion: Southwestern

Area
  - Total: 221 km^{2} (85 sq mi)

Population (2002)
  - Total: 7,608
  - Density: 34.5/km^{2} (89/sq mi)
- Time zone: UTC-5 (Colombia Standard Time)

Caicedo (Spanish pronunciation: [kajˈseðo]) is a town and municipality in Antioquia Department, Colombia. It is part of the sub-region of Southwestern Antioquia. In 2002, the population was 7,608, with a density ratio of 34.5/km² (89 mi²).
