= Titiribí =

- Municipality and town
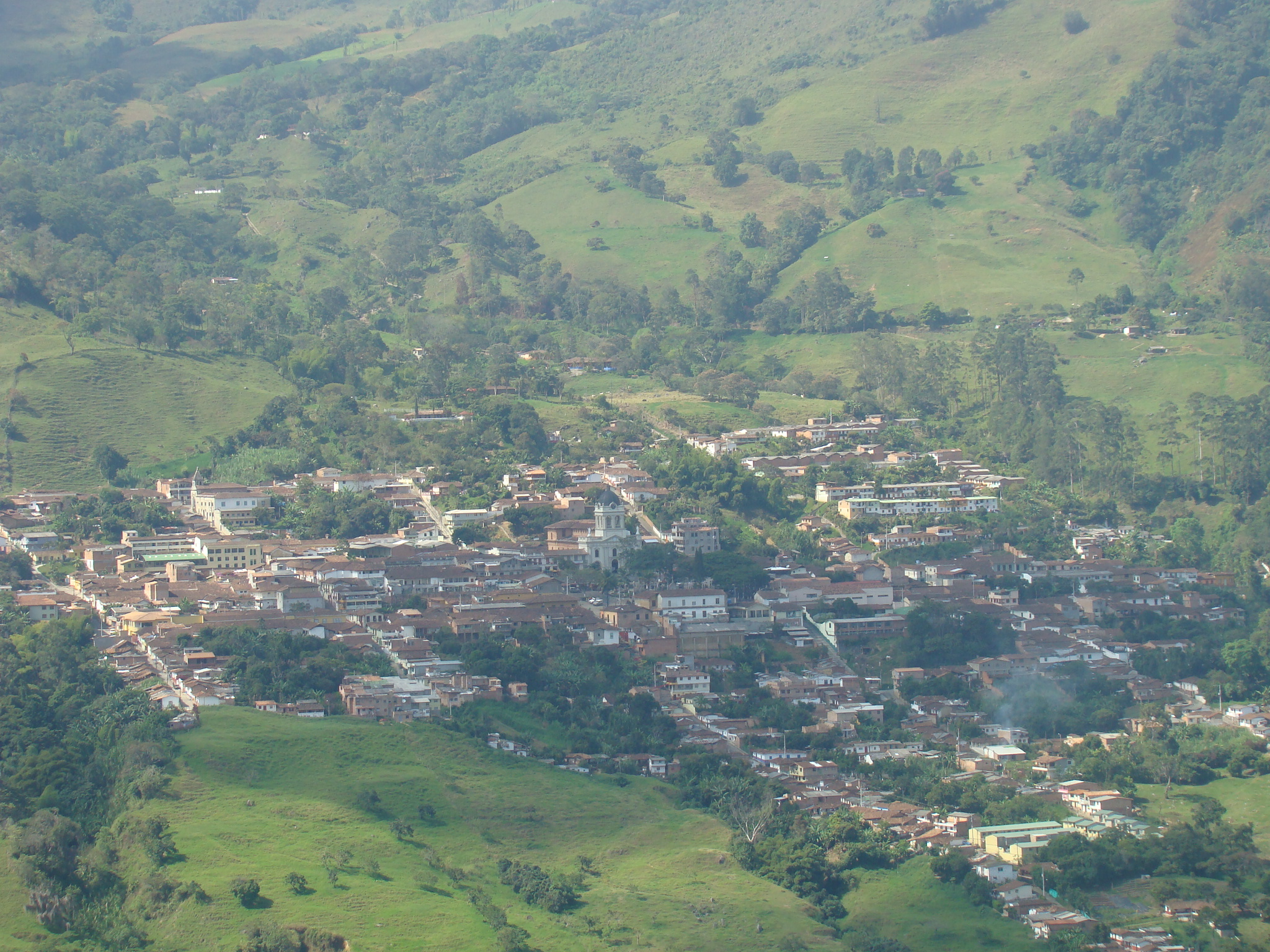
- View of Titiribí

- Flag Coat of arms

- Location of the municipality and town of Titiribí in the Antioquia Department of Colombia

- Location in Colombia
- Coordinates: 6°3′45″N 75°47′37″W
- Country: Colombia
- Department: Antioquia Department
- Subregion: Southwestern

Area
  - Total: 142 km^{2} (55 sq mi)
- Elevation: 1,550 m (5,090 ft)

Population (Census 2018)
  - Total: 8,316
  - Density: 58.6/km^{2} (152/sq mi)
- Time zone: UTC-5 (Colombia Standard Time)

Titiribí is a town and municipality in the Colombian department of Antioquia. Located at an elevation of 1,550 m (5,090 ft) above sea level, it is part of the sub-region of Southwestern Antioquia.
