= Amagá =

- Municipality and town
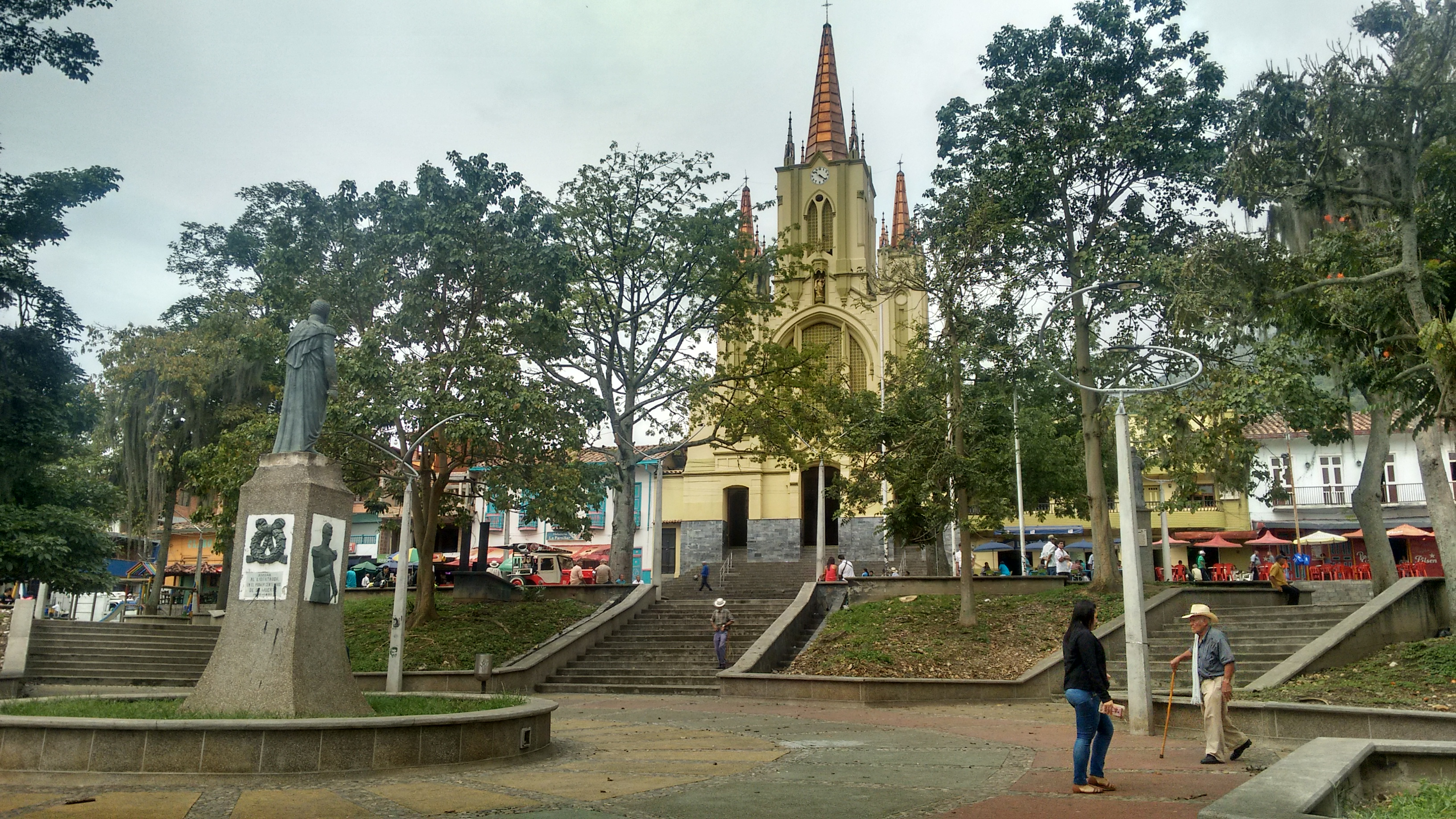
- Emiro Kastos park in Amagá

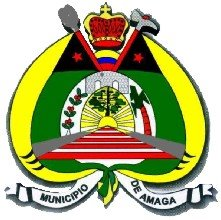
- Flag Coat of arms

- Location of the municipality and town of Amagá in the Antioquia Department of Colombia

- Location in Colombia
- Coordinates: 6°03′N 75°42′W
- Country: Colombia
- Department: Antioquia Department
- Subregion: Southwestern

Area
  - Total: 84 km^{2} (32 sq mi)

Population (2015)
  - Total: 29,555
- Time zone: UTC-5 (Colombia Standard Time)

Amagá (Spanish pronunciation: [amaˈɣa]) is a town and municipality in Antioquia Department, Colombia. It is part of the subregion of Southwestern Antioquia. The area was known for its coal and iron ore production and it hosted early iron works. Ex-Colombian president Belisario Betancur was born in this location. As of 2015, the population comprised 29,555 people.

== Notable places ==
The Forge (La Ferrería) produced the first steel in Antioquia and operated from 1864 to 1931. Its ruins are now a Rural National Monument. There is also a very famous touristic place which is called "El viaducto" (the path).

== Climate ==
Climate data for Amagá
Month	Jan	Feb	Mar	Apr	May	Jun	Jul	Aug	Sep	Oct	Nov	Dec	Year
Mean daily maximum °F	81.9	82.8	83.8	82.9	81.7	81.7	82.9	82.2	81.1	80.1	79.7	79.9	81.7
Daily mean °F	71.1	72.0	73.2	73.0	72.3	71.8	72.1	71.8	70.9	70.7	70.5	70.2	71.6
Mean daily minimum °F	60.4	61.2	62.6	63.1	63.1	61.9	61.5	61.3	60.8	61.3	61.3	60.6	61.6
Average precipitation inches	3.0	3.6	5.1	8.5	10.7	8.0	6.7	8.1	8.3	10.9	8.7	4.5	86.1
Mean daily maximum °C	27.7	28.2	28.8	28.3	27.6	27.6	28.3	27.9	27.3	26.7	26.5	26.6	27.6
Daily mean °C	21.7	22.2	22.9	22.8	22.4	22.1	22.3	22.1	21.6	21.5	21.4	21.2	22.0
Mean daily minimum °C	15.8	16.2	17.0	17.3	17.3	16.6	16.4	16.3	16.0	16.3	16.3	15.9	16.5
Average precipitation mm	76	92	130	215	273	202	169	206	212	276	221	115	2,187
Source: climate-data.org
