= Fredonia, Antioquia =

- Municipality and town
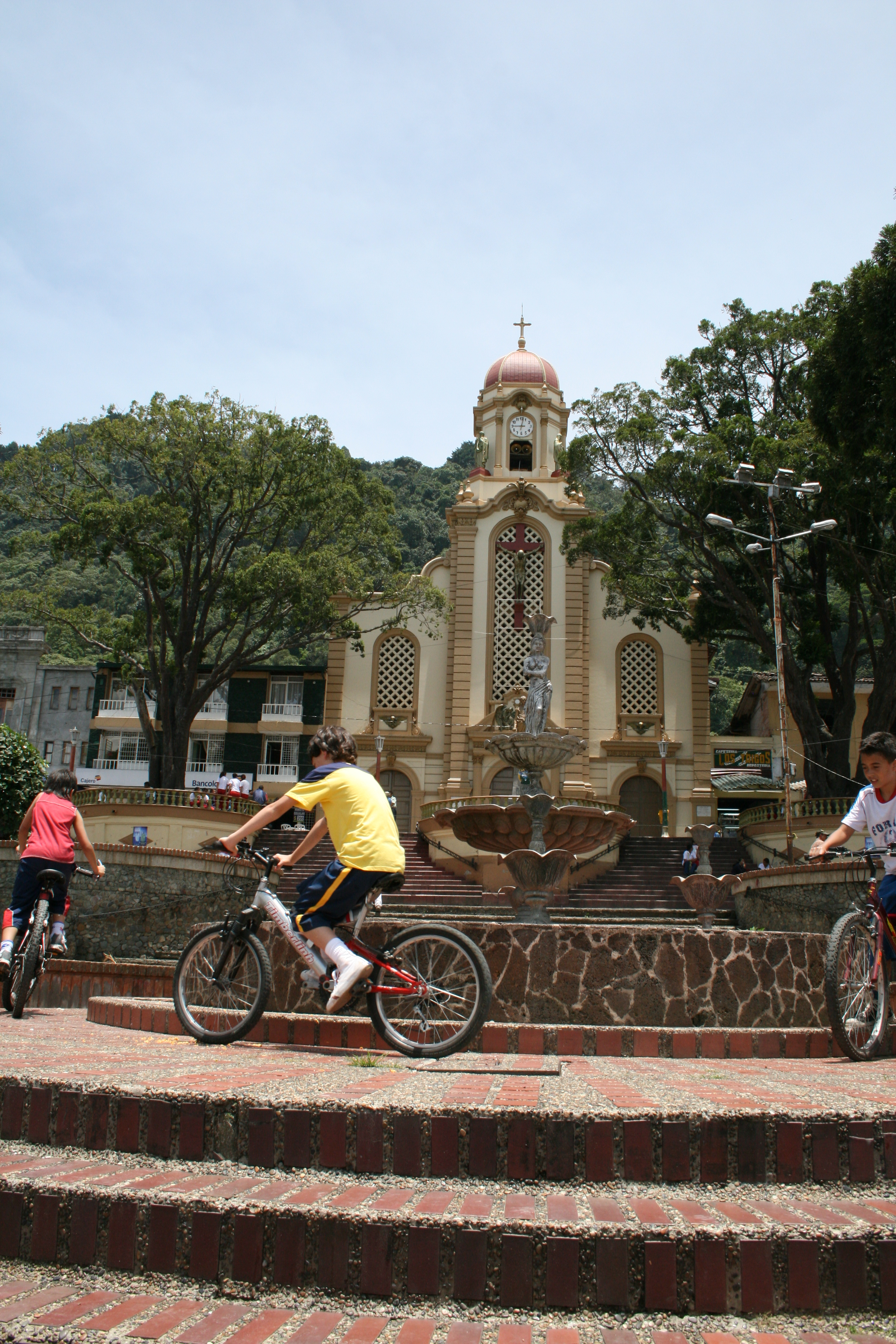

- Flag Seal

- Location of the municipality and town of Fredonia, Antioquia in the Antioquia Department of Colombia

- Location in Colombia
- Coordinates: 5°55′0″N 75°40′0″W
- Country: Colombia
- Department: Antioquia Department
- Subregion: Southwestern

Population (Census 2018)
  - Total: 18,790
- Time zone: UTC-5 (Colombia Standard Time)

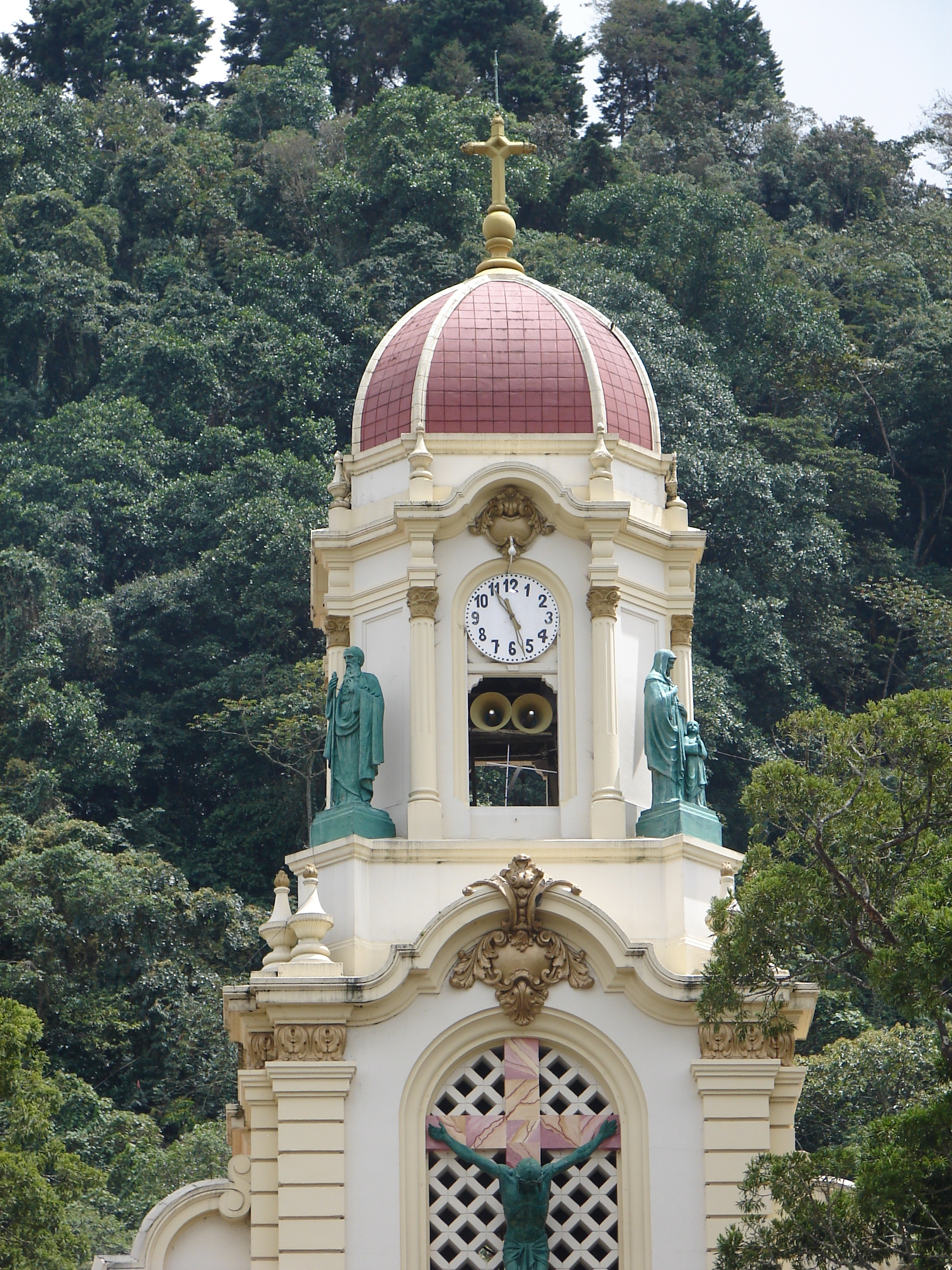
Church

Fredonia (Spanish pronunciation: [fɾeˈðonja]) is a town and municipality in the Colombian department of Antioquia. It is part of the sub-region of Southwestern Antioquia. According to the 2018 census, the population comprises 18,790 people.

== Climate ==
Climate data for Fredonia/Venecia (Rosario El), elevation 1,600 m (5,200 ft), (1981–2010)
Month	Jan	Feb	Mar	Apr	May	Jun	Jul	Aug	Sep	Oct	Nov	Dec	Year
Mean daily maximum °C (°F)	25.0 (77.0)	25.6 (78.1)	26.1 (79.0)	24.9 (76.8)	24.5 (76.1)	25.0 (77.0)	25.4 (77.7)	25.2 (77.4)	24.6 (76.3)	23.6 (74.5)	23.8 (74.8)	24.4 (75.9)	24.8 (76.6)
Daily mean °C (°F)	20.3 (68.5)	20.7 (69.3)	21.0 (69.8)	20.3 (68.5)	20.1 (68.2)	20.5 (68.9)	20.8 (69.4)	20.6 (69.1)	19.9 (67.8)	19.1 (66.4)	19.4 (66.9)	19.9 (67.8)	20.2 (68.4)
Mean daily minimum °C (°F)	16.0 (60.8)	16.3 (61.3)	16.5 (61.7)	16.3 (61.3)	16.1 (61.0)	16.2 (61.2)	16.0 (60.8)	16.0 (60.8)	15.6 (60.1)	15.4 (59.7)	15.8 (60.4)	16.1 (61.0)	16.0 (60.8)
Average precipitation mm (inches)	92.1 (3.63)	105.6 (4.16)	168.6 (6.64)	253.9 (10.00)	345.9 (13.62)	248.6 (9.79)	188.1 (7.41)	237.9 (9.37)	297.9 (11.73)	310.8 (12.24)	259.0 (10.20)	166.3 (6.55)	2,674.7 (105.30)
Average precipitation days (≥ 1.0 mm)	14	15	16	22	23	17	15	18	21	25	22	17	224
Average relative humidity (%)	72	70	69	76	78	74	69	70	75	80	80	76	74
Mean monthly sunshine hours	176.7	160.9	167.4	138.0	148.8	186.0	217.0	198.4	156.0	124.0	132.0	176.7	1,981.9
Mean daily sunshine hours	5.7	5.7	5.4	4.6	4.8	6.2	7.0	6.4	5.2	4.0	4.4	5.7	5.4
Source: Instituto de Hidrologia Meteorologia y Estudios Ambientales

Climate data for Fredonia (Tunez Hda), elevation 530 m (1,740 ft), (1981–2010)
Month	Jan	Feb	Mar	Apr	May	Jun	Jul	Aug	Sep	Oct	Nov	Dec	Year
Mean daily maximum °C (°F)	33.4 (92.1)	34.1 (93.4)	34.1 (93.4)	32.8 (91.0)	32.2 (90.0)	32.5 (90.5)	33.1 (91.6)	33.5 (92.3)	32.7 (90.9)	32.0 (89.6)	31.9 (89.4)	32.3 (90.1)	32.9 (91.2)
Daily mean °C (°F)	26.1 (79.0)	27.0 (80.6)	27.0 (80.6)	26.4 (79.5)	25.9 (78.6)	25.8 (78.4)	25.9 (78.6)	26.1 (79.0)	25.7 (78.3)	25.2 (77.4)	25.4 (77.7)	25.4 (77.7)	26 (79)
Mean daily minimum °C (°F)	19.1 (66.4)	19.4 (66.9)	19.8 (67.6)	20.0 (68.0)	19.9 (67.8)	19.7 (67.5)	19.2 (66.6)	19.2 (66.6)	19.3 (66.7)	19.4 (66.9)	19.6 (67.3)	19.4 (66.9)	19.5 (67.1)
Average precipitation mm (inches)	57.3 (2.26)	76.3 (3.00)	114.2 (4.50)	170.0 (6.69)	219.7 (8.65)	167.9 (6.61)	142.3 (5.60)	160.4 (6.31)	214.1 (8.43)	243.6 (9.59)	209.7 (8.26)	125.3 (4.93)	1,900.8 (74.83)
Average precipitation days (≥ 1.0 mm)	9	11	13	18	19	15	14	15	18	21	18	13	180
Average relative humidity (%)	75	72	73	77	80	79	77	76	79	81	81	80	77
Mean monthly sunshine hours	201.5	180.7	176.7	150.0	161.2	177.0	204.6	198.4	168.0	155.0	165.0	182.9	2,121
Mean daily sunshine hours	6.5	6.4	5.7	5.0	5.2	5.9	6.6	6.4	5.6	5.0	5.5	5.9	5.8
Source: Instituto de Hidrologia Meteorologia y Estudios Ambientales
