= Caramanta =

- Municipality and town

- Flag Coat of arms

- Location of the municipality and town of Caramanta in the Antioquia Department of Colombia

- Location in Colombia
- Coordinates: 5°35′N 75°35′W
- Country: Colombia
- Department: Antioquia Department
- Subregion: Southwestern

Area
  - Total: 86 km^{2} (33 sq mi)

Population (2002)
  - Total: 7,771
  - Density: 90.5/km^{2} (234/sq mi)
- Time zone: UTC-5 (Colombia Standard Time)

Caramanta is a town and municipality in the Colombian department of Antioquia. It is part of the sub-region of Southwestern Antioquia.

== Climate ==
Caramanta has a subtropical highland climate (Cfb). It has heavy rainfall year round.

Climate data for Caramanta
Month	Jan	Feb	Mar	Apr	May	Jun	Jul	Aug	Sep	Oct	Nov	Dec	Year
Mean daily maximum °C (°F)	20.9 (69.6)	21.3 (70.3)	21.4 (70.5)	20.6 (69.1)	20.8 (69.4)	20.9 (69.6)	21.4 (70.5)	21.2 (70.2)	20.9 (69.6)	20.3 (68.5)	20.3 (68.5)	20.4 (68.7)	20.9 (69.5)
Daily mean °C (°F)	16.7 (62.1)	17.1 (62.8)	17.3 (63.1)	16.7 (62.1)	17.0 (62.6)	16.9 (62.4)	17.0 (62.6)	17.0 (62.6)	16.7 (62.1)	16.4 (61.5)	16.4 (61.5)	16.5 (61.7)	16.8 (62.3)
Mean daily minimum °C (°F)	12.6 (54.7)	12.9 (55.2)	13.2 (55.8)	12.9 (55.2)	13.3 (55.9)	13.0 (55.4)	12.7 (54.9)	12.8 (55.0)	12.6 (54.7)	12.6 (54.7)	12.6 (54.7)	12.7 (54.9)	12.8 (55.1)
Average rainfall mm (inches)	123.6 (4.87)	156.3 (6.15)	216.8 (8.54)	248.9 (9.80)	283.3 (11.15)	175.6 (6.91)	168.6 (6.64)	175.4 (6.91)	253.2 (9.97)	299.1 (11.78)	299.4 (11.79)	190.5 (7.50)	2,590.7 (102.01)
Average rainy days	9	11	14	17	17	12	12	12	16	18	18	12	168
Source 1:
Source 2:
