= Jericó, Antioquia =

Jericó
- Municipality and town
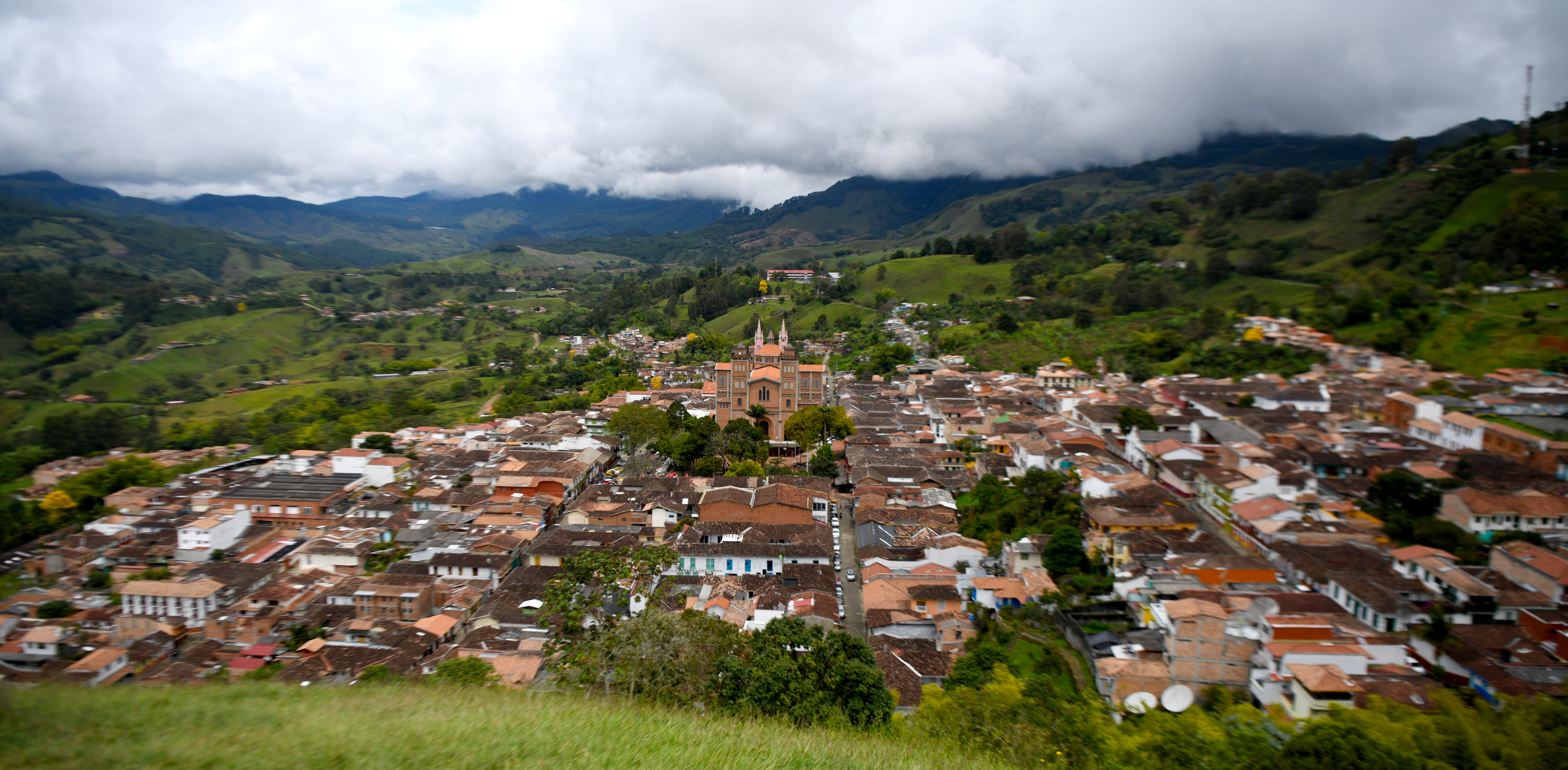
- View of Jericó

- Flag Coat of arms

- Location of the municipality and town of Jericó in the Antioquia Department of Colombia

- Location in Colombia
- Coordinates: 5°47′28″N 75°47′9″W
- Country: Colombia
- Department: Antioquia Department
- Subregion: Southwestern
- Established: 1851

Area
  - Municipality and town: 193 km^{2} (75 sq mi)
- Elevation: 1,910 m (6,270 ft)

Population (2015)
  - Municipality and town: 12,103
  - Urban: 8,460
- Time zone: UTC-5 (Colombia Standard Time)
- Website: Official website

Jericó is a town, municipality and Catholic bishopric in the Colombian department of Antioquia. It is part of the subregion of Southwestern Antioquia. The distance reference from Medellín city, the capital of the department, is 104 km (64.6 miles). It lies 1,910 m (6,266 ft) above sea level.

== History ==
The town was founded on September 28, 1850, by pioneer Santiago Santamaría. It was established as municipality on 1851. During a territorial rearrangement on the country on 1908, Jericó became the capital of the homonymous department until 1911.

In 2013, Jericó became the third municipality in Antioquia to be named a Pueblo Patrimonio (heritage town) of Colombia.

== Religion ==
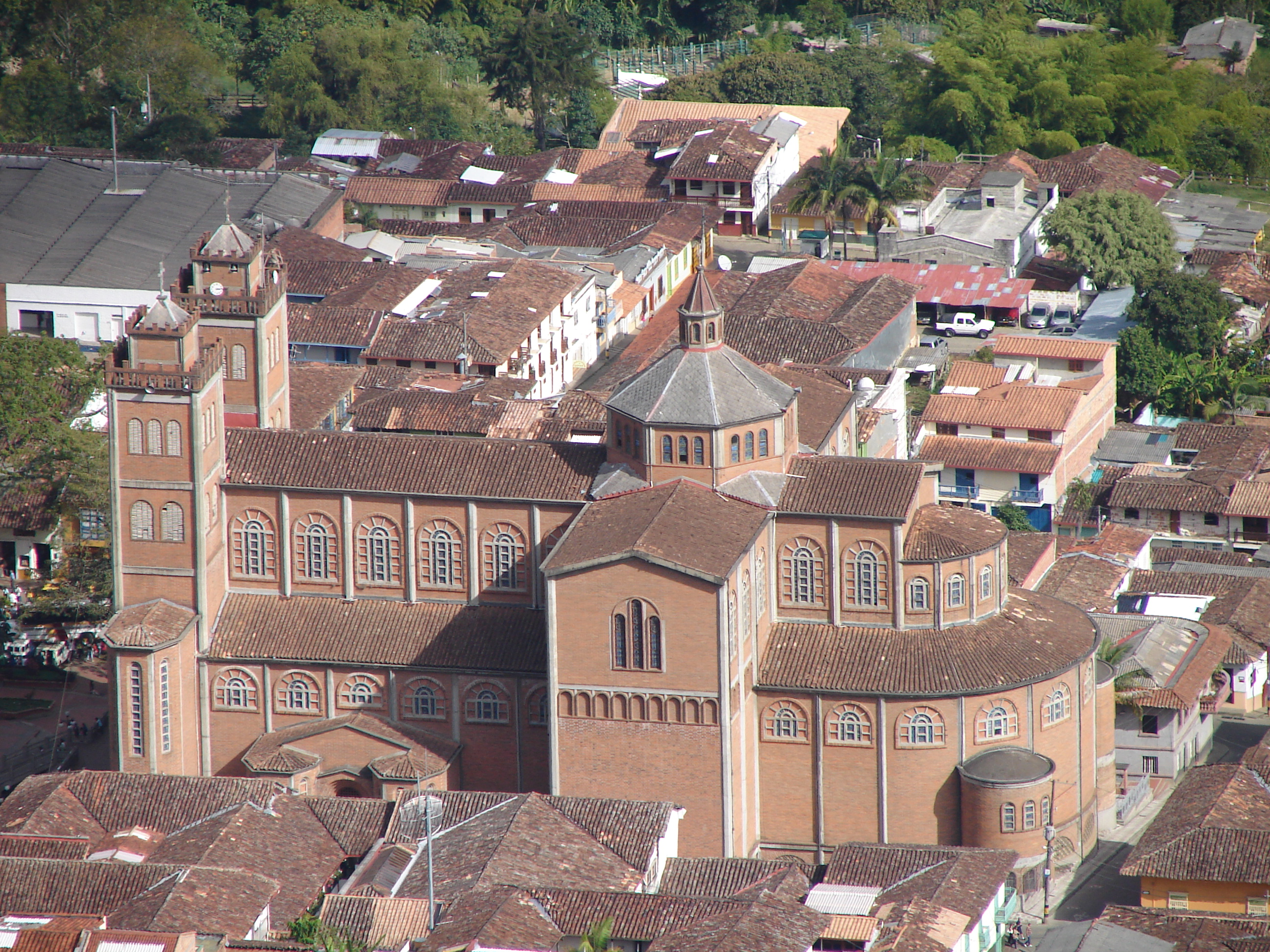
Jericó Cathedral

Its Catedral de Nuestra Señora de las Mercedes, dedicated to Our Lady of Mercy, is the episcopal cathedral see of the Roman Catholic Diocese of Jericó (founded 1915, when the first cathedral was built). Due to some damages, the first church had to be replaced by the present cathedral, since 1949. The town is the birthplace of Laura of Saint Catherine of Siena, canonized as saint by Pope Francis on 2013.

== Notable people from Jericó ==
- Héctor Abad Gómez
- Francisco Luis Lema
- Manuel Mejía Vallejo
- Laura of Saint Catherine of Siena
- Jesusita Vallejo
- José Restrepo Jaramillo

== Sites of Interest ==
- Botanical Garden
- Cristo Salvador viewpoint
- Bomarzo cultural center
- Cerro Las Nubes natural reserve and viewpoint
- Casa Museo de Santa Laura
- Centro de Historia
- Museo Antropologico y de Arte (MAJA)
- Museo de Arte Religioso

== Sources and external links ==
- GCatholic - cathedral, with Google satellite picture
- GCatholic - diocese, with Google map and satellite picture
