= Valparaíso, Antioquia =

- Municipality and town
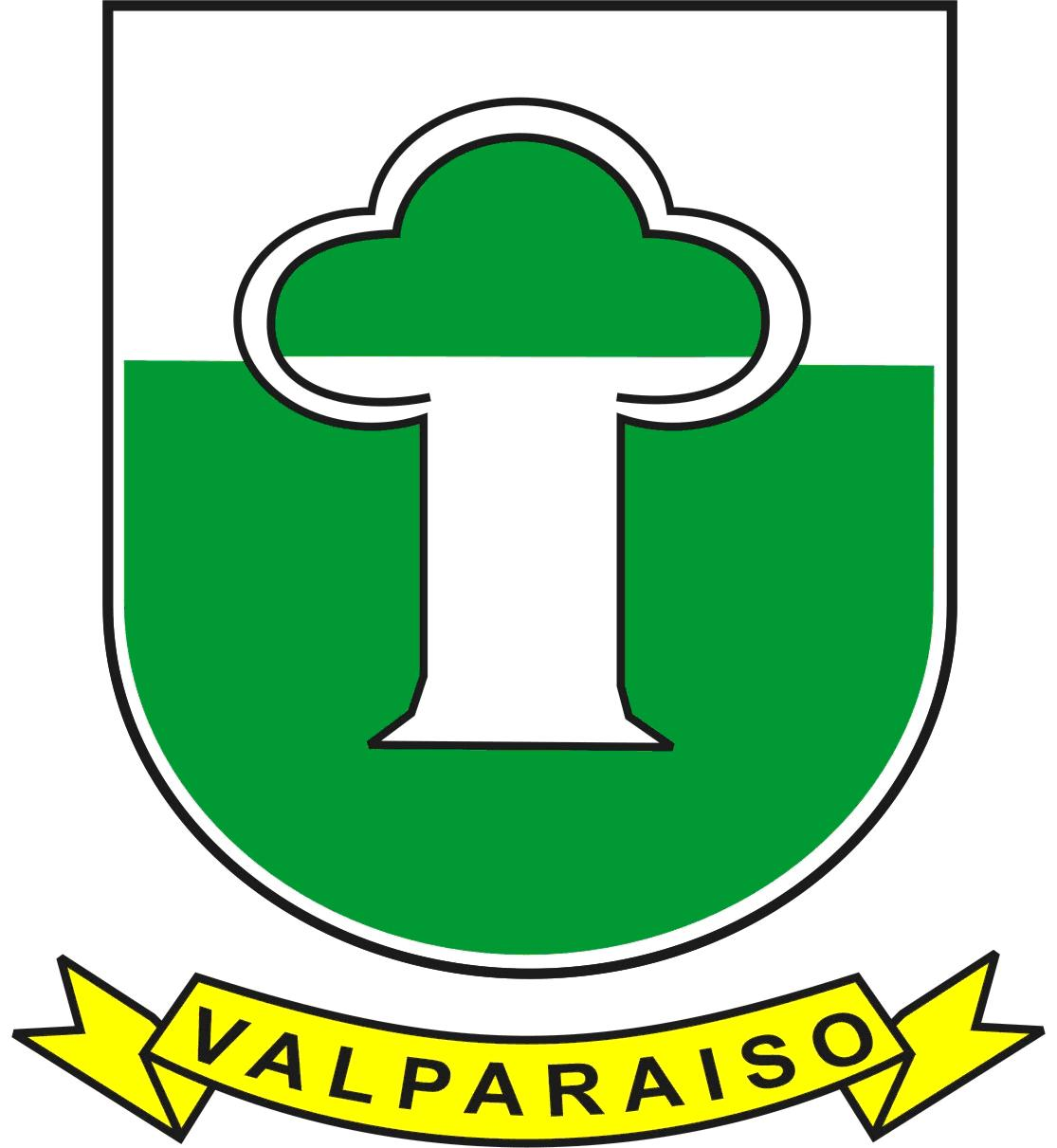
- Flag Coat of arms

- Location of the municipality and town of Valparaíso, Antioquia in the Antioquia Department of Colombia

- Location in Colombia
- Coordinates: 5°36′52″N 75°37′32″W
- Country: Colombia
- Department: Antioquia Department
- Subregion: Southwestern
- Established: August 23, 1860
- Time zone: UTC-5 (Colombia Standard Time)

Valparaíso (English: /ˌvɑːlpɑːrɑːˈiːsoʊ/ VAHL-pah-rah-EE-soh; Spanish pronunciation: [balpaɾaˈiso]) is a town and municipality in Antioquia Department, Colombia. Part of the subregion of Southwestern Antioquia. According to the 2002 census, the population comprised 8,033 people.
