= Andes, Antioquia =

Andes
- Municipality & Town
- Flag Coat of arms

- Location of the municipality of Andes in the Antioquia Department of Colombia

- Location in Colombia
- Coordinates: 5°35′N 75°55′W
- Country: Colombia
- Department: Antioquia Department
- Subregion: Southwestern
- Foundation: March 13th, 1852

Government
  - Mayor: Elkin Dario Jaramillo Jaramillo (2012-2015)

Area
  - Municipality & Town: 402.5 km^{2} (155.4 sq mi)
  - Urban: 2.07 km^{2} (0.80 sq mi)
- Elevation: 1,360 m (4,460 ft)

Population (2018 census)
  - Municipality & Town: 43,269
  - Density: 107.5/km^{2} (278.4/sq mi)
  - Urban: 20,250
  - Urban density: 9,780/km^{2} (25,300/sq mi)
- Time zone: UTC-5 (Colombia Standard Time)
- Website: http://www.andes-antioquia.gov.co/

Andes is a municipality and town in the Antioquia Department, Colombia. Part of the sub-region of Southwestern Antioquia, it is located on the western Colombian Andes mountain range. Andes was founded on 13 March 1852 by Pedro Antonio Restrepo Escobar. Its elevation is 1,360 metres above sea level with an average temperature of 22 °C. The distance reference from Medellín city, the capital of Antioquia Department, is 117 km and it has a total area of 402.5 km^{2}. This town is well known for being the place where Gonzalo Arango a writer, philosopher and Antioquian journalist was born. The more significantly source of its economy is agriculture, mainly coffee cultivation.

== Climate ==
Andes has a tropical rainforest climate (Köppen: Af) with consistent temperatures, cool nights, and abundant rainfall.

Climate data for Andes (Ita Andes), elevation 1,180 m (3,870 ft), (1981–2010)
Month	Jan	Feb	Mar	Apr	May	Jun	Jul	Aug	Sep	Oct	Nov	Dec	Year
Mean daily maximum °C (°F)	29.1 (84.4)	29.6 (85.3)	29.5 (85.1)	28.9 (84.0)	28.3 (82.9)	28.3 (82.9)	28.6 (83.5)	28.5 (83.3)	28.3 (82.9)	27.9 (82.2)	28.0 (82.4)	28.2 (82.8)	28.7 (83.7)
Daily mean °C (°F)	22.1 (71.8)	22.6 (72.7)	22.5 (72.5)	22.3 (72.1)	22.0 (71.6)	21.8 (71.2)	22.0 (71.6)	21.9 (71.4)	21.6 (70.9)	21.6 (70.9)	21.7 (71.1)	21.7 (71.1)	22 (72)
Mean daily minimum °C (°F)	16.4 (61.5)	17.0 (62.6)	17.1 (62.8)	17.0 (62.6)	17.0 (62.6)	16.7 (62.1)	16.5 (61.7)	16.4 (61.5)	16.6 (61.9)	16.6 (61.9)	16.9 (62.4)	16.8 (62.2)	16.7 (62.1)
Average precipitation mm (inches)	82.5 (3.25)	99.4 (3.91)	165.1 (6.50)	228.6 (9.00)	248.2 (9.77)	193.8 (7.63)	183.5 (7.22)	178.9 (7.04)	226.1 (8.90)	212.4 (8.36)	188.4 (7.42)	129.6 (5.10)	2,136.4 (84.11)
Average precipitation days (≥ 1.0 mm)	13	14	17	23	23	20	18	19	22	24	20	15	225
Average relative humidity (%)	79	79	79	81	83	82	81	81	82	81	82	82	81
Mean monthly sunshine hours	164.3	152.4	133.3	117.0	127.1	138.0	170.5	158.1	126.0	124.0	132.0	145.7	1,688.4
Mean daily sunshine hours	5.3	5.4	4.3	3.9	4.1	4.6	5.5	5.1	4.2	4.0	4.4	4.7	4.6
Source: Instituto de Hidrologia Meteorologia y Estudios Ambientales
