= Tarso =

- Municipality and town
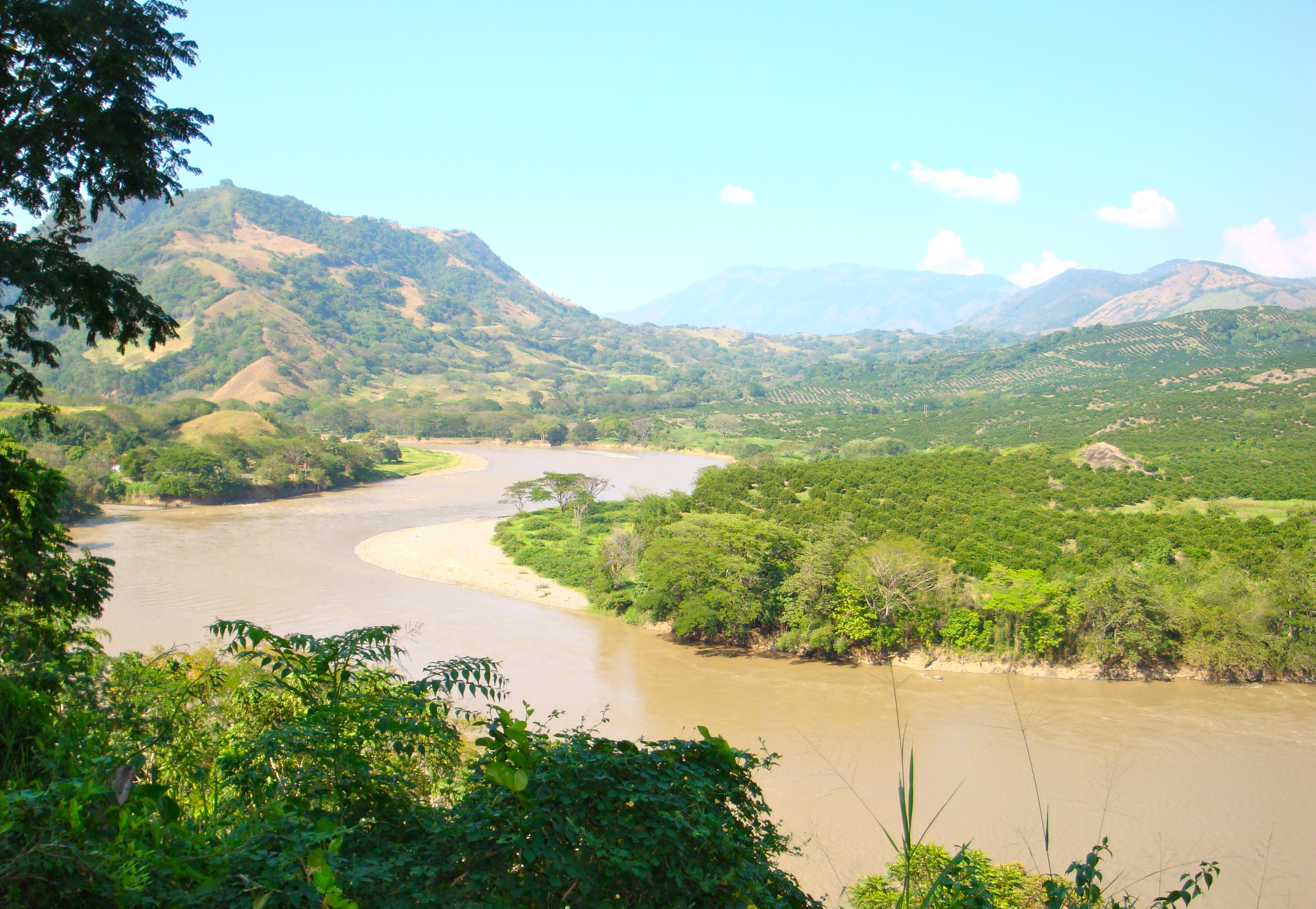

- Flag Coat of arms

- Location of the municipality and town of Tarso in the Antioquia Department of Colombia

- Location in Colombia
- Coordinates: 5°51′54″N 75°49′21″W
- Country: Colombia
- Department: Antioquia Department
- Subregion: Southwestern
- Elevation: 1,235 m (4,052 ft)
- Time zone: UTC-5 (Colombia Standard Time)

Tarso is a town and municipality in Antioquia Department, Colombia. Located at an elevation of 1,235 m (4,052 ft) above sea level, it lies in the subregion of Southwestern Antioquia.

== History ==
In 2000, in Tarso, the AUC executed Luis Emilio Corrales Londoño, the head of the community action committee El Cedrón.
