= Salgar =

- Municipality and town
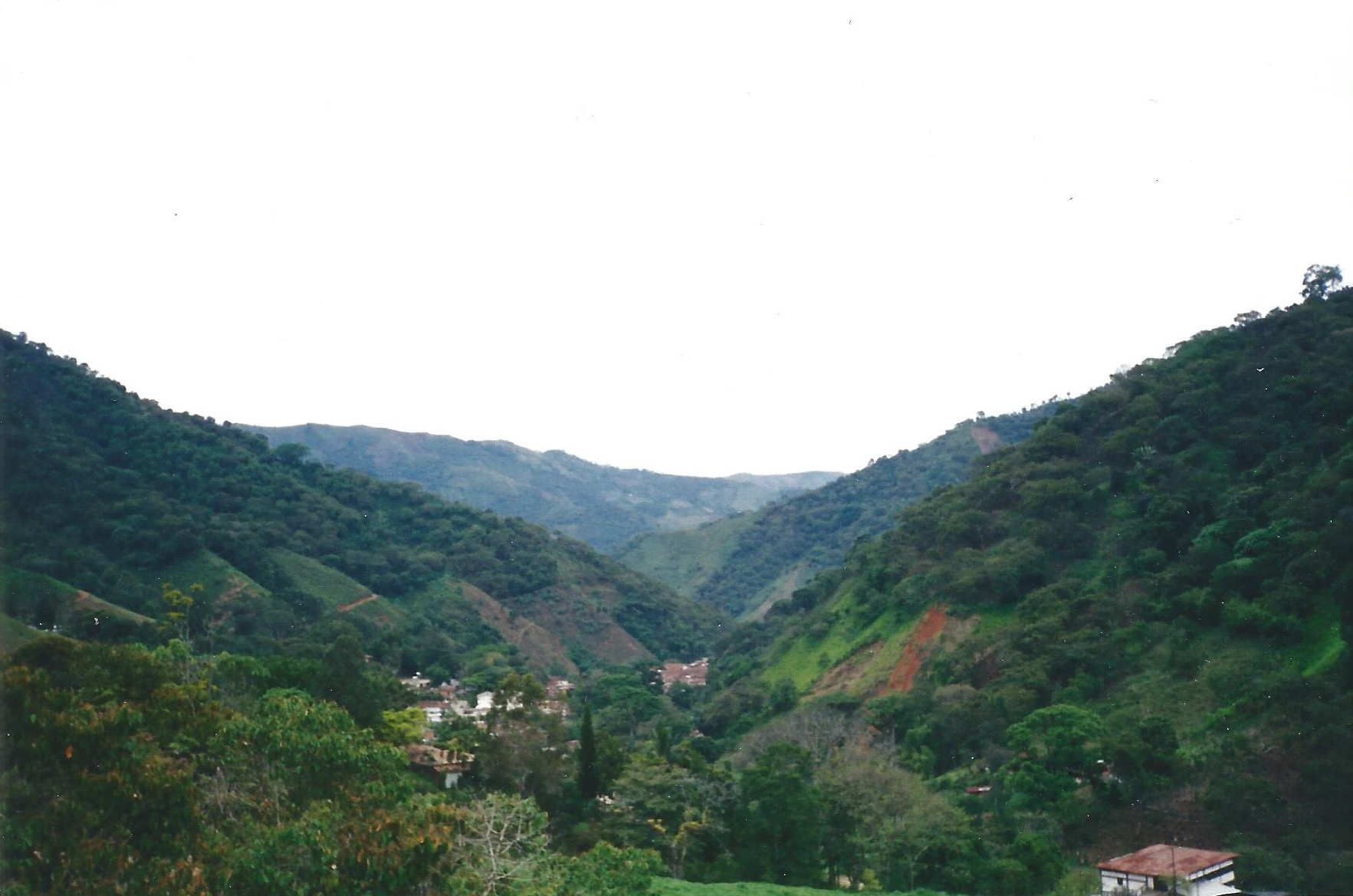
- Mountains around Salgar

- Flag Seal

- Location of the municipality and town of Salgar in the Antioquia Department of Colombia

- Location in Colombia
- Coordinates: 5°57′42″N 75°58′31″W
- Country: Colombia
- Department: Antioquia Department
- Subregion: Southwestern

Area
  - Total: 418 km^{2} (161 sq mi)

Population (Census 2018)
  - Total: 15,782
  - Density: 37.8/km^{2} (97.8/sq mi)
- Time zone: UTC-5 (Colombia Standard Time)

Salgar (Spanish pronunciation: [salˈɣaɾ]) is a town and municipality in the Colombian department of Antioquia.

With a population of 15,782, as per the 2018 census, Salgar is part of the sub-region of Southwestern Antioquia.

The town was hit by a massive landslide in 2015.
