= Betulia, Antioquia =

Betulia
- Municipality and town
- Flag Coat of arms

- Location of the municipality and town of Betulia, Antioquia in the Antioquia Department of Colombia

- Location in Colombia
- Coordinates: 6°6′44″N 75°59′2″W
- Country: Colombia
- Department: Antioquia Department
- Subregion: Southwestern

Area
  - Total: 252 km^{2} (97 sq mi)
- Elevation: 1,600 m (5,200 ft)

Population (Census 2018)
  - Total: 15,097
  - Density: 59.9/km^{2} (155/sq mi)
- Time zone: UTC-5 (Colombia Standard Time)

Betulia is a town and municipality in the Colombian department of Antioquia. It is part of the sub-region of Southwestern Antioquia. According to the 2018 census, its population comprised 15,097 people.

== Climate ==
Betulia has a relatively cool tropical rainforest climate (Af) due to altitude with heavy rainfall year-round.

Climate data for Betulia
Month	Jan	Feb	Mar	Apr	May	Jun	Jul	Aug	Sep	Oct	Nov	Dec	Year
Mean daily maximum °C (°F)	25.1 (77.2)	25.4 (77.7)	25.7 (78.3)	25.5 (77.9)	24.8 (76.6)	24.8 (76.6)	25.4 (77.7)	25.1 (77.2)	24.6 (76.3)	24.1 (75.4)	24.1 (75.4)	24.2 (75.6)	24.9 (76.8)
Daily mean °C (°F)	19.8 (67.6)	20.1 (68.2)	20.4 (68.7)	20.4 (68.7)	20.0 (68.0)	19.8 (67.6)	20.1 (68.2)	19.8 (67.6)	19.6 (67.3)	19.4 (66.9)	19.4 (66.9)	19.3 (66.7)	19.8 (67.7)
Mean daily minimum °C (°F)	14.5 (58.1)	14.8 (58.6)	15.2 (59.4)	15.3 (59.5)	15.2 (59.4)	14.9 (58.8)	14.8 (58.6)	14.6 (58.3)	14.6 (58.3)	14.7 (58.5)	14.7 (58.5)	14.5 (58.1)	14.8 (58.7)
Average rainfall mm (inches)	95 (3.7)	96 (3.8)	147 (5.8)	238 (9.4)	282 (11.1)	235 (9.3)	208 (8.2)	223 (8.8)	229 (9.0)	301 (11.9)	218 (8.6)	138 (5.4)	2,410 (95)
Source: Climate-Data.org
