= Santa Bárbara, Antioquia =

Santa Bárbara
- Municipality and town
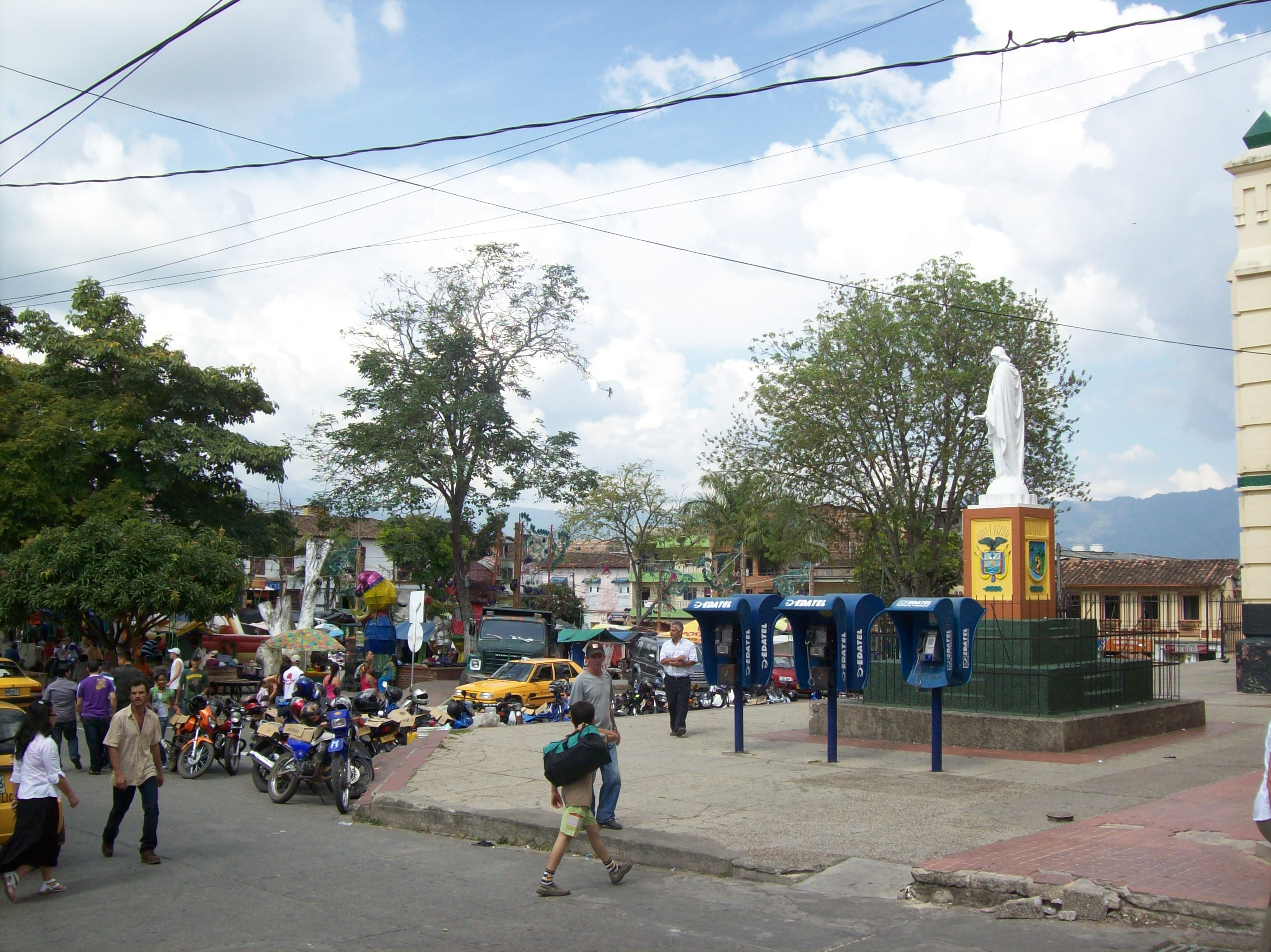
- View of Santa Bárbara

- Flag Coat of arms

- Location of the municipality and town of Santa Barbara in the Antioquia Department of Colombia

- Location in Colombia
- Coordinates: 5°52′29″N 75°33′58″W
- Country: Colombia
- Department: Antioquia Department
- Subregion: Southwestern

Area
  - Total: 491 km^{2} (190 sq mi)
- Elevation: 1,800 m (5,900 ft)

Population (Census 2018)
  - Total: 22,030
- Time zone: UTC-5 (Colombia Standard Time)

Santa Bárbara is a town and municipality in the Colombian department of Antioquia. Part of the subregion of Southwestern Antioquia. Santa Barbara is located in a valley about 1.5 hours drive from Medellín by car or bus. It lies at an elevation of 1,800 m (5,900 ft) above the sea level.
