= Ciudad Bolívar, Antioquia =

- Municipality and town
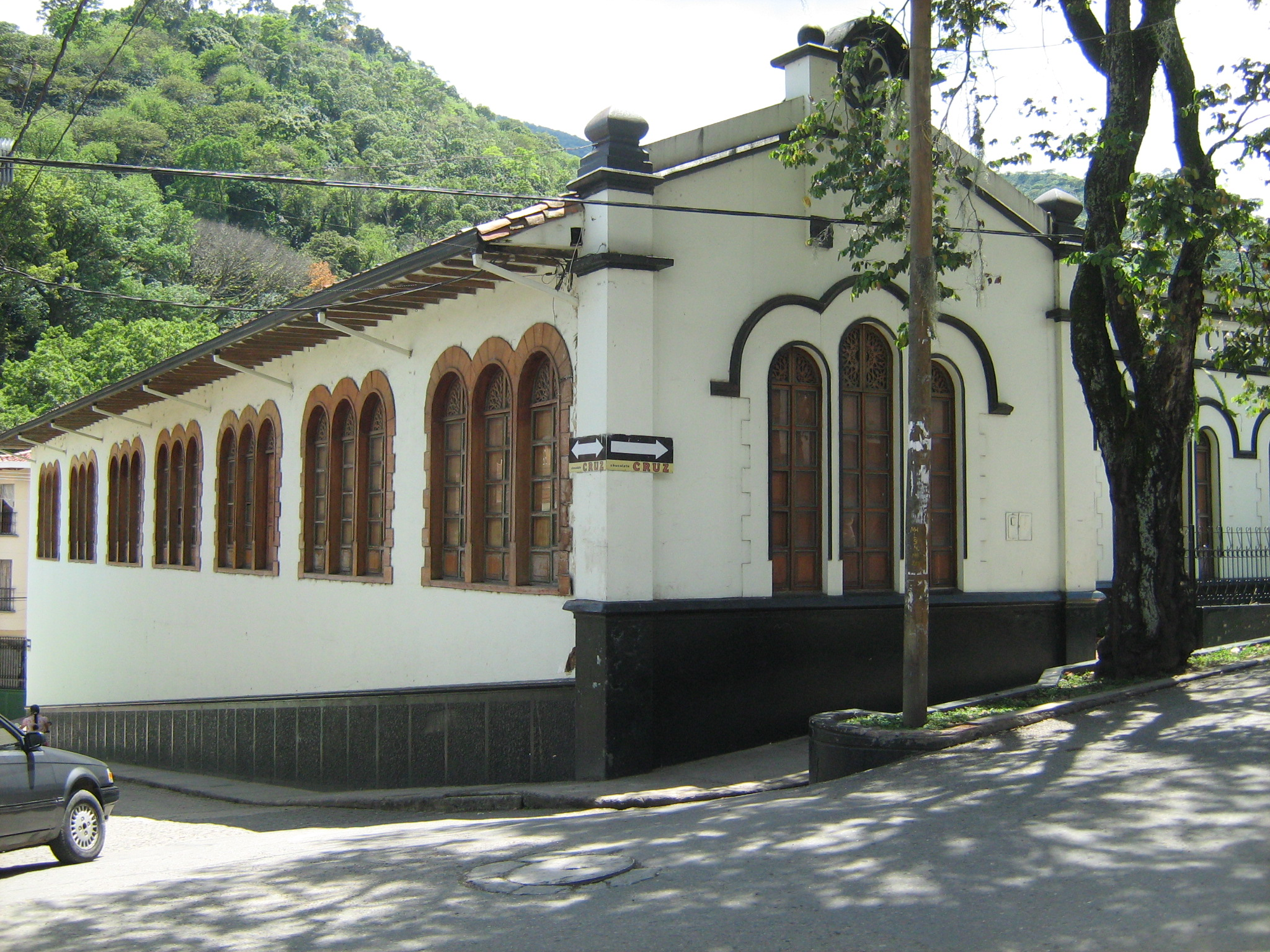

- Flag Coat of arms

- Location of the municipality and town of Ciudad Bolívar, Antioquia in the Antioquia Department of Colombia

- Location in Colombia
- Coordinates: 5°50′58″N 76°1′13″W
- Country: Colombia
- Department: Antioquia Department
- Subregion: Southwestern

Population (Census 2018)
  - Total: 23,361
- Time zone: UTC-5 (Colombia Standard Time)

Bolívar is a town and municipality in Antioquia Department, Colombia. Part of the sub-region of Southwestern Antioquia, it is known as the birthplace of professional international cyclists Carlos Betancur and Julián Arredondo.

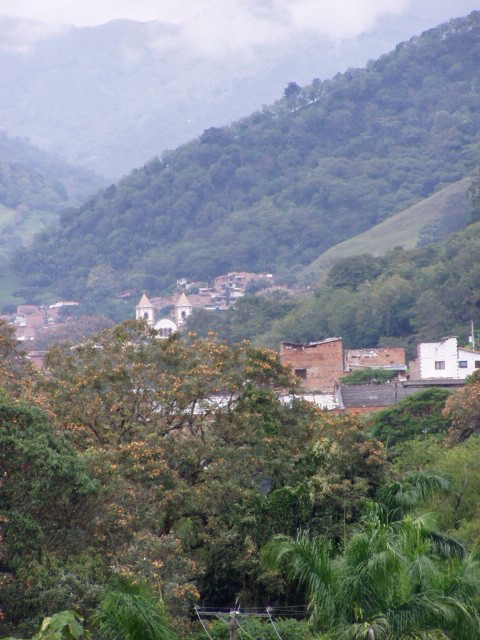
Bolívar seen from the road connecting the town to the main highway. The two towers are the steeples of the main church fronting onto Bolívar's central square.

== Climate ==
Climate data for Ciudad Bolívar (Mansa La), elevation 2,100 m (6,900 ft), (1981–2010)
Month	Jan	Feb	Mar	Apr	May	Jun	Jul	Aug	Sep	Oct	Nov	Dec	Year
Mean daily maximum °C (°F)	21.1 (70.0)	21.4 (70.5)	21.4 (70.5)	21.2 (70.2)	21.1 (70.0)	21.2 (70.2)	21.3 (70.3)	21.4 (70.5)	20.9 (69.6)	20.5 (68.9)	20.4 (68.7)	20.6 (69.1)	21.0 (69.8)
Daily mean °C (°F)	16.7 (62.1)	16.9 (62.4)	17.0 (62.6)	17.0 (62.6)	17.1 (62.8)	17.0 (62.6)	16.8 (62.2)	16.8 (62.2)	16.6 (61.9)	16.4 (61.5)	16.4 (61.5)	16.6 (61.9)	16.8 (62.2)
Mean daily minimum °C (°F)	12.9 (55.2)	13.1 (55.6)	13.3 (55.9)	13.5 (56.3)	13.4 (56.1)	13.0 (55.4)	12.5 (54.5)	12.6 (54.7)	12.8 (55.0)	12.8 (55.0)	13.0 (55.4)	13.0 (55.4)	13.0 (55.4)
Average precipitation mm (inches)	124.6 (4.91)	139.2 (5.48)	177.3 (6.98)	236.5 (9.31)	290.4 (11.43)	241.1 (9.49)	230.4 (9.07)	219.8 (8.65)	245.7 (9.67)	230.0 (9.06)	198.4 (7.81)	141.3 (5.56)	2,474.8 (97.43)
Average precipitation days (≥ 1.0 mm)	16	16	19	23	25	21	20	20	23	25	23	19	250
Average relative humidity (%)	87	87	88	89	89	88	87	86	88	88	89	89	88
Mean monthly sunshine hours	148.8	144.0	148.8	126.0	145.7	147.0	192.2	192.2	150.0	130.2	126.0	136.4	1,787.3
Mean daily sunshine hours	4.8	5.1	4.8	4.2	4.7	4.9	6.2	6.2	5.0	4.2	4.2	4.4	4.9
Source: Instituto de Hidrologia Meteorologia y Estudios Ambientales
