= Bethany (disambiguation) =

Bethany is the name of two villages mentioned in the New Testament of the Bible:

- Bethany near Jerusalem, today known as Al-Eizariya, which means "the place of Lazarus"
- Bethany (or Bethabara) beyond the Jordan, today known as Al-Maghtas.

It may also refer to:

== Building ==
- Nginden Bethany Church, is an evangelical megachurch affiliated with Bethany Indonesian Church in Surabaya, Indonesia

== Film ==
- Bethany (film), a 2017 American horror film starring Tom Green

== Music ==
- Bethany (band), an alternative arena rock band
- "Bethany", a version of the hymn "Nearer, My God, to Thee"

== Names ==
- Bethany (given name), a female given name

== Other places ==
=== Australia ===
- Bethany, South Australia

=== Canada ===
- Béthanie, Quebec, a hamlet roughly between Montreal and Sherbrooke
- Bethany, Lennox and Addington County, Ontario
- Bethany, Ontario, an unincorporated village in the municipality of Kawartha Lakes near Peterborough

=== Eswatini ===
- Bethany, Eswatini

=== Jordan & Palestine ===
- Bethany, the biblical village in ancient Palestine
- Al-Maghtas, the supposed 'Bethany beyond the Jordan' where Jesus was baptised; possibly identical with Bethabara.

=== Namibia ===
- Bethanie, Namibia

=== South Africa ===
- Bethanie, Free State
- Bethanie, North West
- Bethanie is also a neighborhood of Cape Town.

=== United Kingdom ===
- Bethany, Cornwall

=== United States ===
- Bethany Township (disambiguation)
- Bethany, Connecticut
- Bethany Beach, Delaware
- Bethany, Florida
- Bethany, Georgia
- Bethany, Illinois
- Bethany, Indiana
- Bethany, Bartholomew County, Indiana
- Bethany, Kentucky (disambiguation)
- Bethany, Louisville, neighborhood of Louisville, Kentucky
- Bethany, Louisiana and Texas
- Bethany Beach, Michigan, a part of the Shorewood-Tower Hills-Harbert, Michigan, Census-Designated Place
- Bethany, Minnesota
- Bethany, Missouri
- Bethany, Nebraska
- Bethany, New York
- Bethany, Ohio
- Bethany, Oklahoma
- Bethany, Oregon
- Bethany, Pennsylvania
- Bethany, South Carolina
- Bethany, Tennessee, in Warren County
- Bethany, Virginia
- Bethany, West Virginia
- South Bethany, Delaware
- Bethany, United States Virgin Islands

== Schools and institutions ==
- Bethany College (disambiguation)
- Bethany Christian Schools
- Bethany Christian Trust
- Bethany Lutheran College
- Bethany Lutheran Theological Seminary
- Bethany Theological Seminary
- Béthanie (Hong Kong)
- Bethany Home, a former residential institution for Protestant women and children in Dublin, Ireland.

== See also ==
- Bettany (disambiguation)
- Betania (disambiguation)
- Bethania (disambiguation)
