= Bettini =

Bettini is a surname of Italian origin. Notable people with the surname include:

- Alessandro Bettini (1821–1898), Italian tenor involved in the UK legal case of Bettini v Gye
- Amalia Bettini (1809–1894), Italian stage actress
- Antonio Bettini (1396–1487), Italian clergyman and writer
- Carlos Bettini (born 1951), Argentinian businessman, politician, and diplomat
- Décimo Bettini (1910–1982), Italian racing cyclist
- Domenico Bettini (1644–1705), Italian painter of the Baroque era
- Gianni Bettini (1860–1938), Italian-American builder of phonographs
- Goffredo Bettini (born 1952), Italian politician, founding member of the Democratic Party (PD)
- Gonzalo Bettini (born 1992), Argentine footballer
- Lorenzo Bettini (1931–2008), Italian professional football player
- Mariano Bettini (born 1996), Argentine professional footballer
- Mario Bettini (1582–1657), Italian Jesuit philosopher, mathematician and astronomer
- Maurizio Bettini (born 1947), Italian philologist, anthropologist and novelist
- Paolo Bettini (born 1974), Italian road-racing bicyclist
- Pietro Bettini (fl. 17th century), Italian engraver of the Baroque era
- Sergio Bettini (1905–1986), Italian art historian
- Thomas Bettini, former member of American rock band Jackyl
- Virginio Bettini (1942–2020), Italian politician
- Zelia Trebelli-Bettini (1838–1892), French opera singer
