= Betania =

Betania may refer to:

- Betania, Colombia, town and municipality in the Colombian department of Antioquia
- Betânia, Pernambuco, city in the state of Pernambuco, Brazil
- Betania, Chiapas, town and in Teopisca municipality, in Chiapas in southern Mexico
- Betania, Jalisco, town and in Ayotlán municipality, in Jalisco in central-western Mexico
- Betania, Kiribati, Betania is a settlement in Kiribati. It is located on the island of Tabuaeran
- Betania, Madagascar, coastal village in Western Madagascar south of Morondava
- Betania, Panama
- Betania, Venezuela, a small village that exists in the town of Cua, located in Miranda State, Venezuela
- Betânia do Piauí, municipality in the state of Piauí in the Northeast region of Brazil
- Betania Monastery, medieval Georgian Orthodox monastery in eastern Georgia

== See also ==
- Bethania (disambiguation)
- Bethany (disambiguation)
- Bettany (disambiguation)
