= Bettany =

Bettany is a surname of English origin. Notable people surnamed Bettany or Bettaney include:

- Amora Bettany, Brazilian video game artist
- Colin Bettany (born 1932), English professional footballer
- Fred Bettany (1860–1924), English footballer
- George Thomas Bettany (1850–1891), British biologist and author
- Jeanie Gwynne Bettany (1857–1941), British novelist
- John Bettany (1937–2019), English former professional footballer
- Lisa Bettany (born 1981), Canadian photographer and entrepreneur
- Michael Bettaney (1950–2018), British intelligence officer convicted of passing secret documents to the Soviets
- Paul Bettany (born 1971), English actor
- Thane Bettany (1929–2015), British actor and former dancer

== Given name ==
- Bettany Hughes (born 1967), English historian, broadcaster, and writer

== See also ==
- Bethany (disambiguation)
- Betania (disambiguation)
- Bethania (disambiguation)
- Bettani
- Bettini
- Bettaney
