= Bettney =

Bettney is an English surname. Notable people with the surname include:

- Julie Bettney (born 1951), Canadian educator and politician
- Chris Bettney (born 1977), English professional footballer

== See also ==
- Bettany
