= The Return of Judith to Bethulia =

Painting by Sandro Botticelli

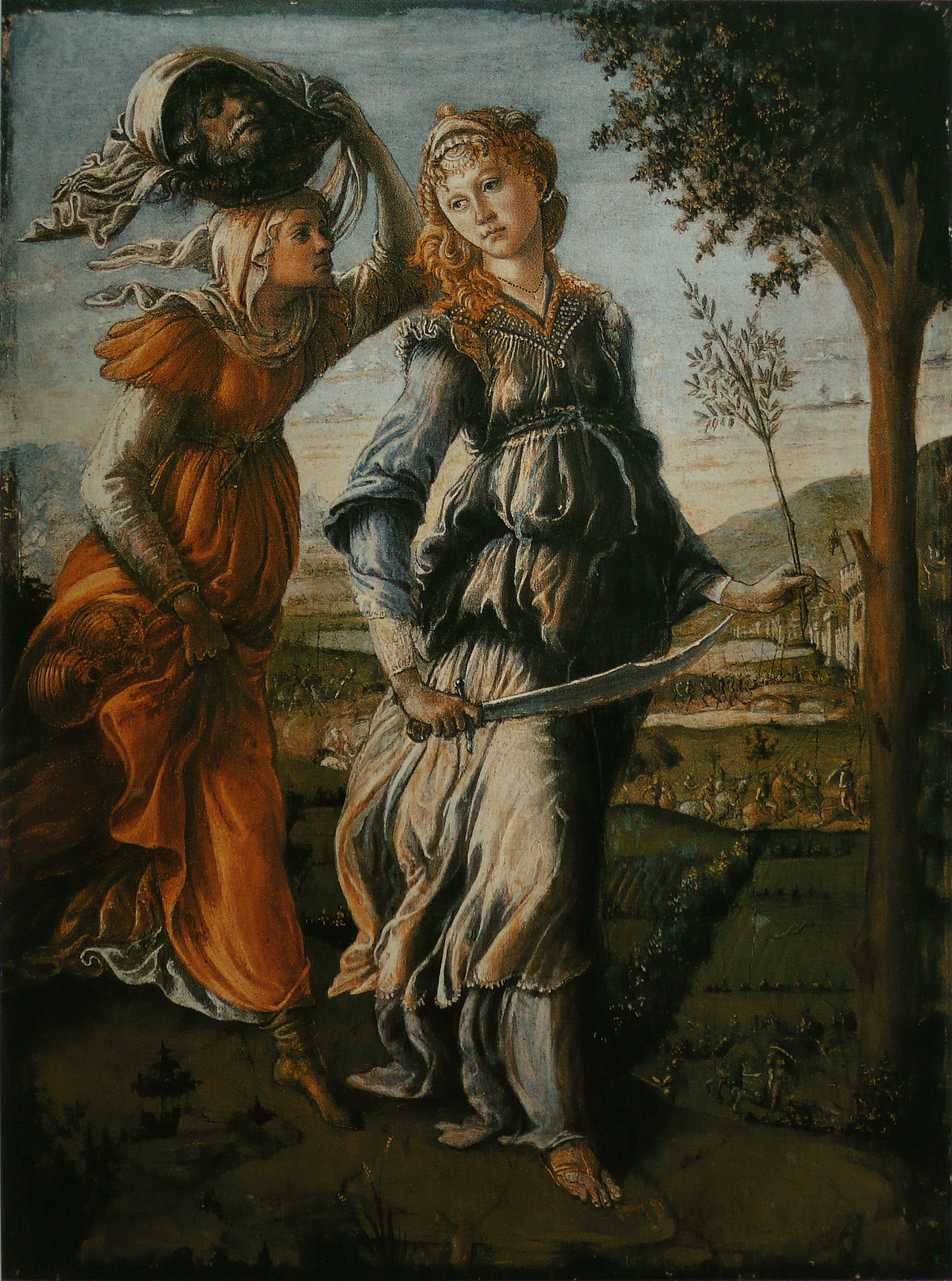
The Return of Judith to Bethulia

The Return of Judith to Bethulia (Italian: Ritorno di Giuditta a Betulia) is a painting by the Italian Renaissance artist, Sandro Botticelli. It was made around the year 1472, and preserved in the Uffizi in Florence.

This small format tempera on panel (31 × 24 cm; 12 x 9.4 in) painting and its pendant, The Discovery of the Body of Holofernes, both kept at the Uffizi in Florence, illustrate related biblical episodes from the deuterocanonical and apocryphal Book of Judith: the aftermath of the decapitation of the Assyrian general Holofernes by a young and beautiful Jewish widow, Judith; and, in this panel, her triumphant return to Bethulia with the severed head.

== Subject ==
Judith as reported in the Book of Judith and in more detail in later Christian iconography, killed Holofernes to save the Jewish people from the Assyrian conquerors.

== Date ==
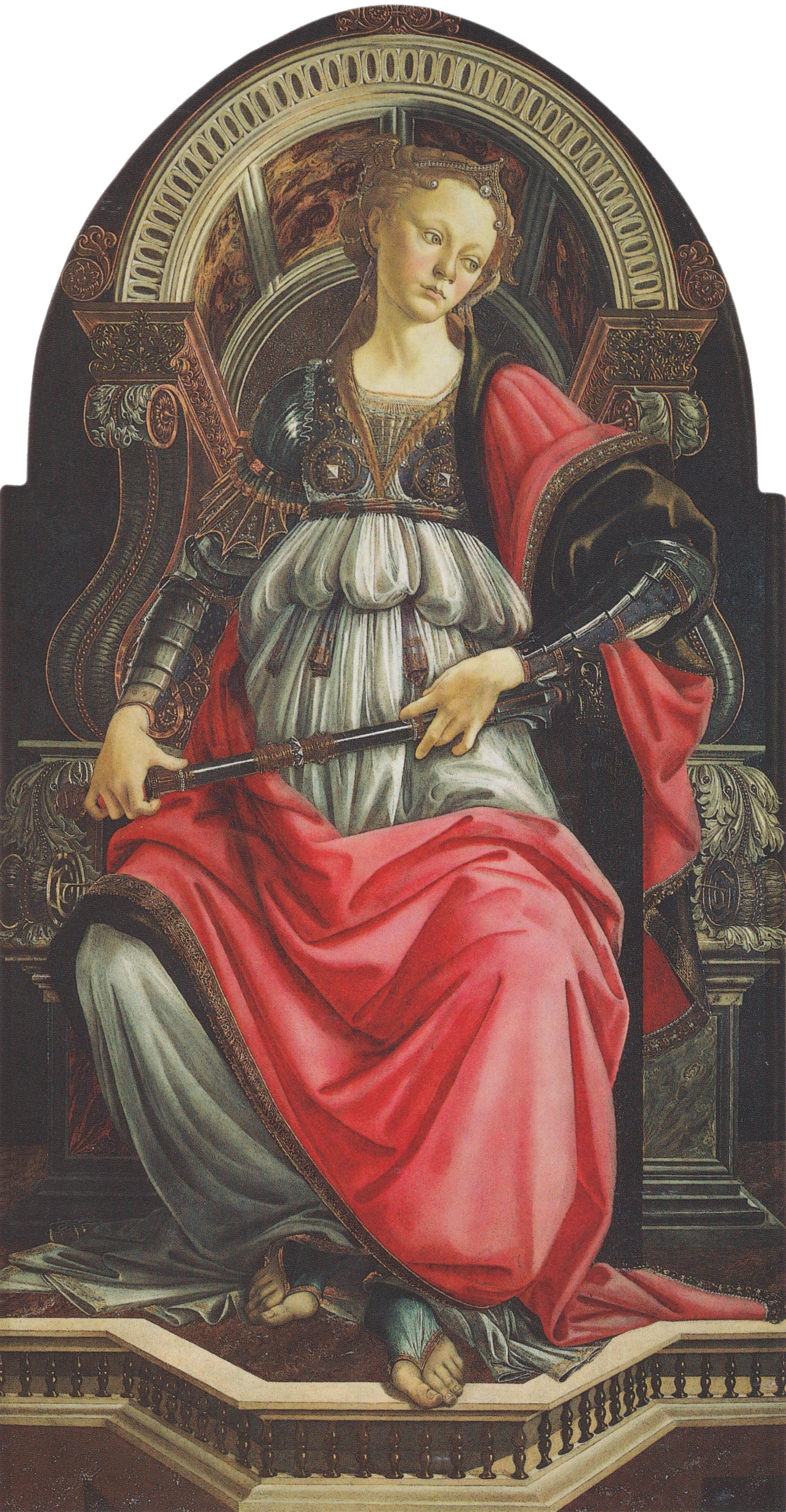
Botticelli's Fortitude, finished in 1470

Scholars agree on the attribution to Botticelli, as an early work, but are divided as to its dating. Stylistic comparison of the face of Judith with that of the central figure in Botticelli's Fortitude, an allegorical painting representing this virtue and commissioned in 1470, argues for an earlier execution: i.e. at the end of the 1460s or early 1470s.

Similarities with the works of Antonio del Pollaiolo generally lead scholars to opt for a dating around 1470 or 1472; although Sergio Bettini dates its creation slightly earlier, to between 1467 and 1468, and notes an influence from Mantegna, who was in Florence in the immediately preceding years.

== Provenance ==
The two small panels on the story of Judith and Holofernes, which are now in the Uffizi Gallery (Nos. 1156 and 1158), are mentioned by Raffaelle Borghini in his Riposo, a work written early in the eighteenth century, and described in the following words: "Two little pictures: in one of which Holofernes is represented, lying in bed with his head cut off, and his barons standing around in amazement, and in the other Judith with the head in a sack. These belonged not long ago to M. Ridolfo Sirigatti, and he gave them to the most Serene lady Bianca Capello dei Medici, our Grand Duchess, hearing that Her Highness wished to adorn a writing cabinet with pictures and antique statues, and judging this little work of Botticelli worthy of a place there." Bequeathed to his son Antoine de Medici by the Grand Duke of Tuscany, the two paintings are listed, between 1587 and 1632, the year of their entry into the collections of the Uffizi, in the inventory of the Casino Mediceo di San Marco. As this inventory specifies, a walnut frame brought them together, thus constituting a diptych. The documents are missing to confirm that this arrangement was the one originally planned by the painter or the sponsor.

== Description ==
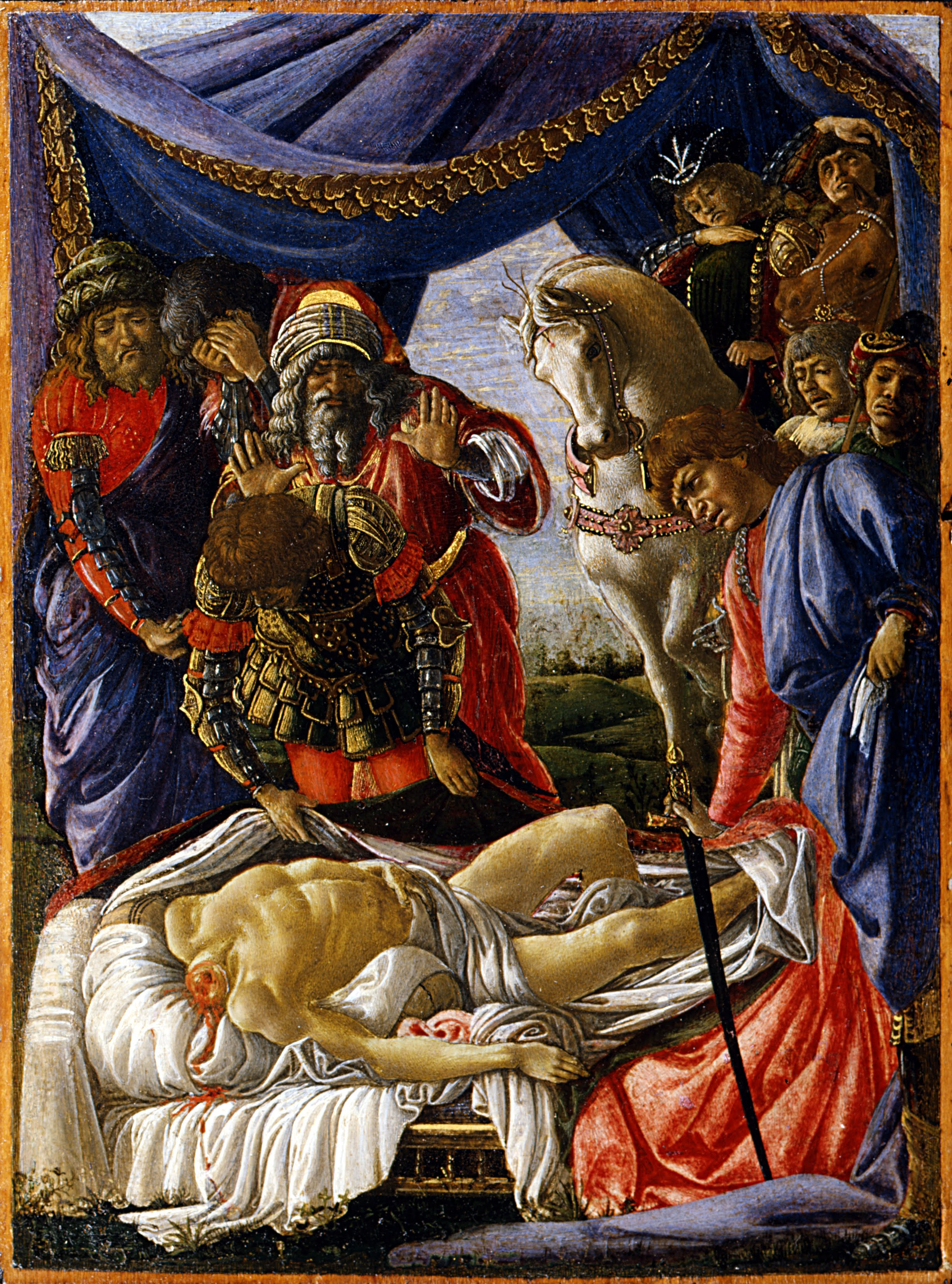
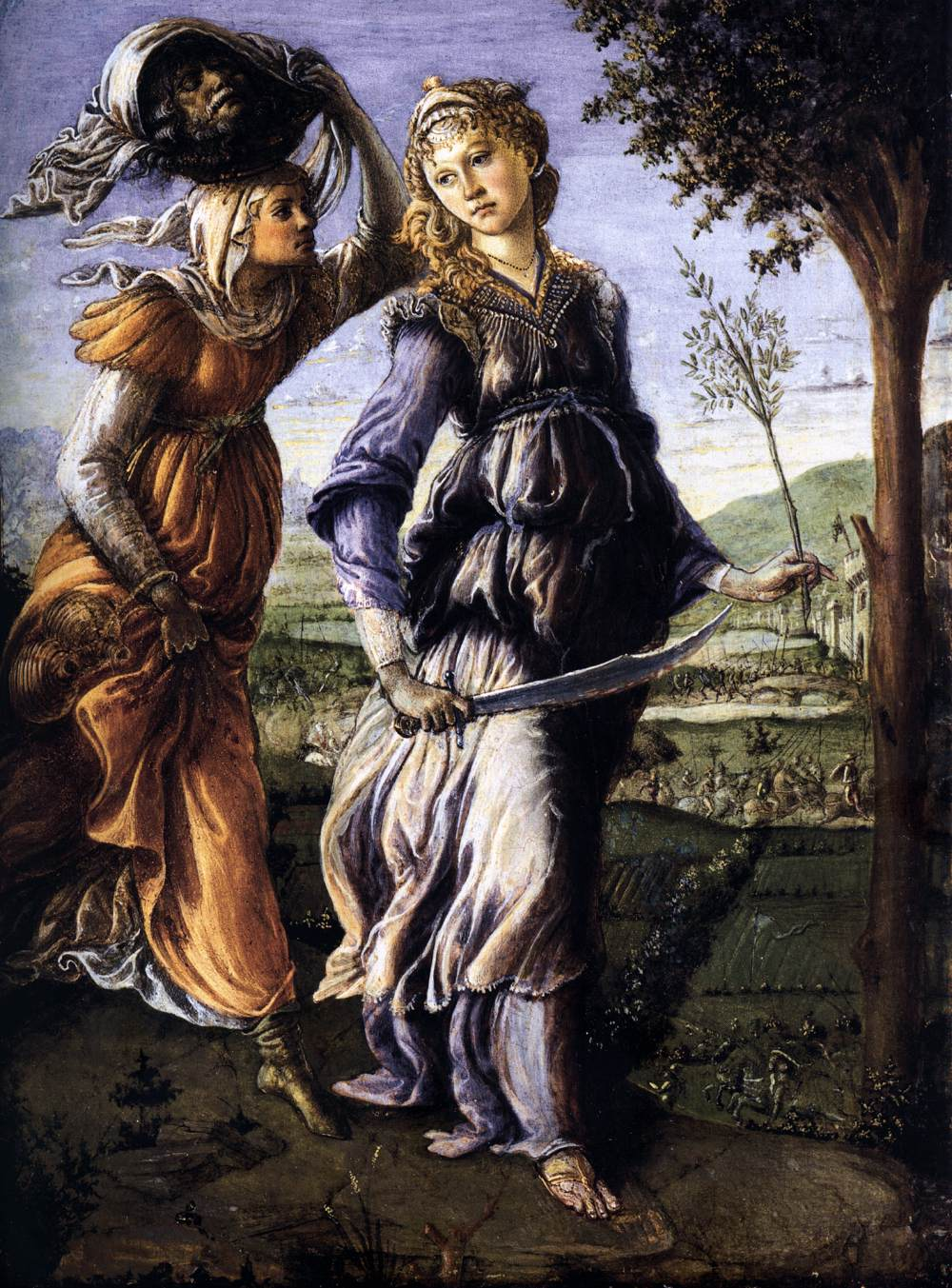
The two Judith panels by Botticelli, arranged as a diptych

Judith is shown clad in rich apparel, or, as the sacred text describes, "in her garments of gladness", bravely decked with bracelets and chains and ornaments, returning from the camp of the Assyrians across the mountains to Bethulia, strong in the might of the great deliverance that she has wrought for Israel. Her right hand holds the sword with which she has severed the neck of Holofernes; in her left she bears an olive-branch, the token of peace, as she walks lightly and swiftly across the open hillside, followed by her faithful handmaiden Abra, carrying the bottle of wine and cruse of oil in one hand, and the head of Holofernes in the sack on her head. In the valley below, on the banks of a broad river, we see the walls and gates of the city and the groups of armed horsemen riding out to meet her. The figure of Judith bears a strong likeness to the Fortitude. She has the same long neck, high cheek bones, and peculiar type of feature. Her eyes have the same wistful look; her countenance wears the same expression of gentle sadness, and forms a striking contrast to the eager, intent air of her serving-maid, whose gaze is fixed in silent devotion on the mistress for whose sake she has dared to meet danger and death.

== Versions ==
Considered an autograph work by the painter and representative of a phase of preparation or study of this panel, an earlier version of this episode was executed around 1468–1469; of a slightly smaller format (29.2 × 21.6 cm), it is now kept at the Cincinnati Museum of Art.

The subject was again broached by Botticelli during the last period of his activity with Judith Leaving the Tent of Holofernes, which is preserved in the Rijksmuseum in Amsterdam. In a darker tone, the painting depicts Judith emerging from the Assyrian general's tent, holding his severed head in one hand and her unsheathed scimitar in the other.

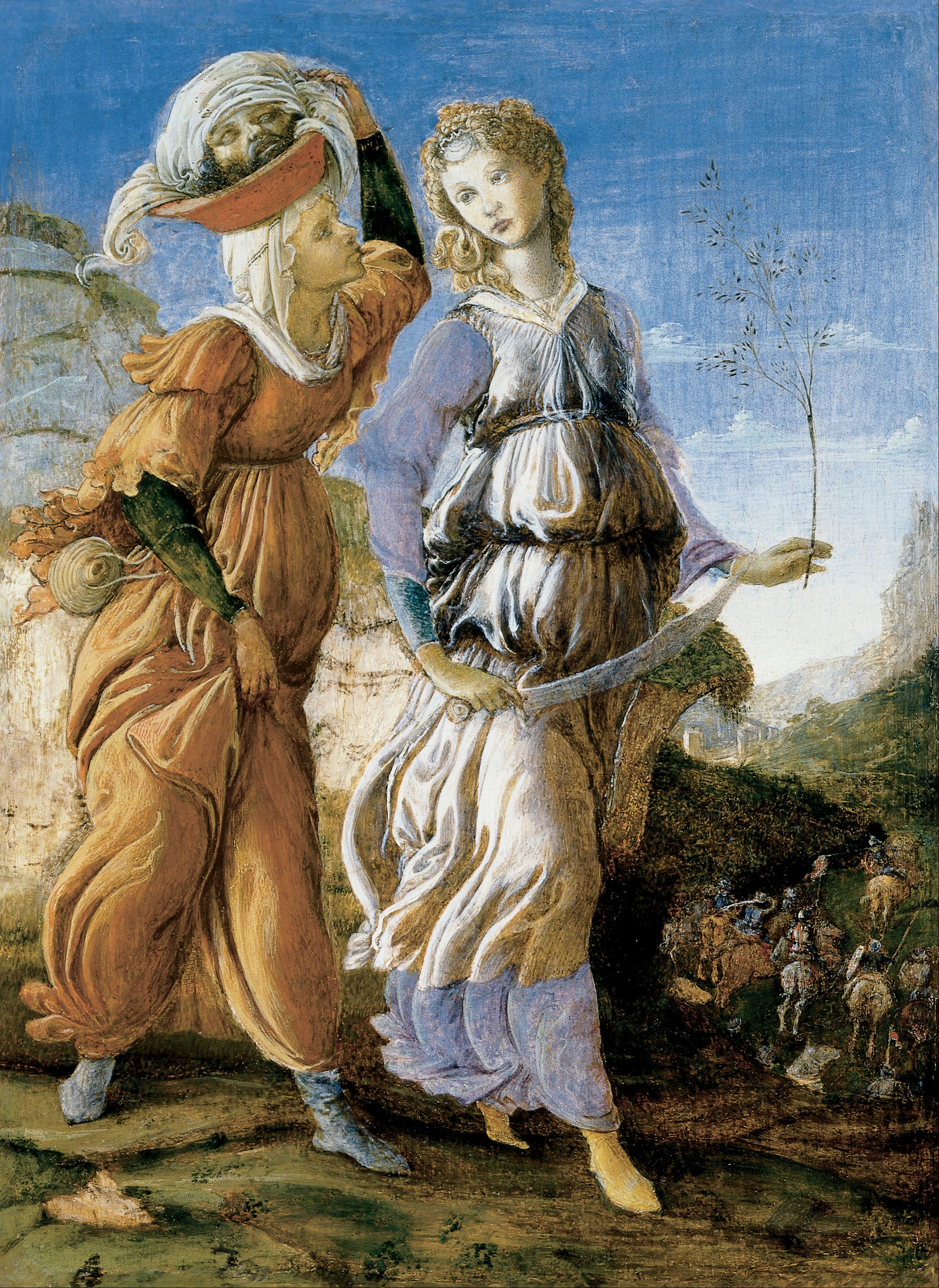
Return of Judith to Bethulia, c. 1468–1469

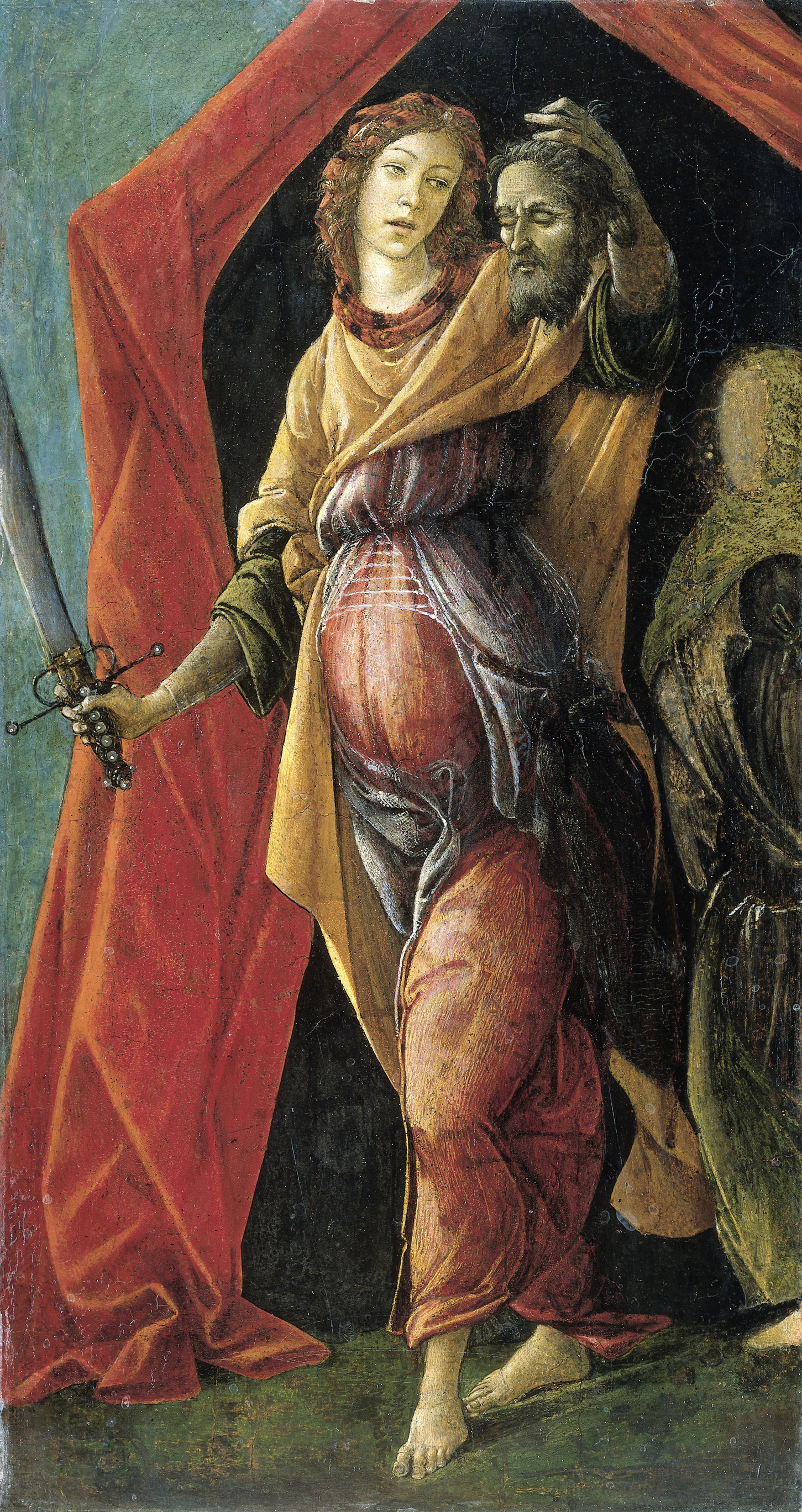
Judith Leaving the Tent of Holofernes, c. 1497–1500

== Sources ==
- Bettini, Sergio (1947). Botticelli (2nd ed.). Bergamo: Instituto Italiano d'Arti Grafiche.
- Grömling, Alexandra; Lingesleben, Tilman (2007). Alessandro Boticelli, 1444/45–1510. Translated by Schoonover, Stéphane. Paris: H. F. Ullmann. pp. 10, 11. ISBN 978-3-8331-3810-2.
- Lightbown, Ronald (1978). Botticelli: Life and Work. Vol. 2. London: Paul Elek.
- Botticelli: de Laurent le Magnifique à Savonarole. Catalogue of the exhibition in Paris, Musée du Luxembourg, from 1 October 2003 to 22 February 2004 and in Florence, Palazzo Strozzi, from 10 March to 11 July 2004. Milan: Skira. 2003. p. 98. ISBN 978-8-8849-1564-1.

Attribution:

- Cartwright, Julia (1904). The Life and Art of Sandro Botticelli. London: Duckworth and Co. pp. 21–5.
