= The Discovery of the Body of Holofernes =

Painting by Sandro Botticelli

- Discovery of the Body of Holofernes
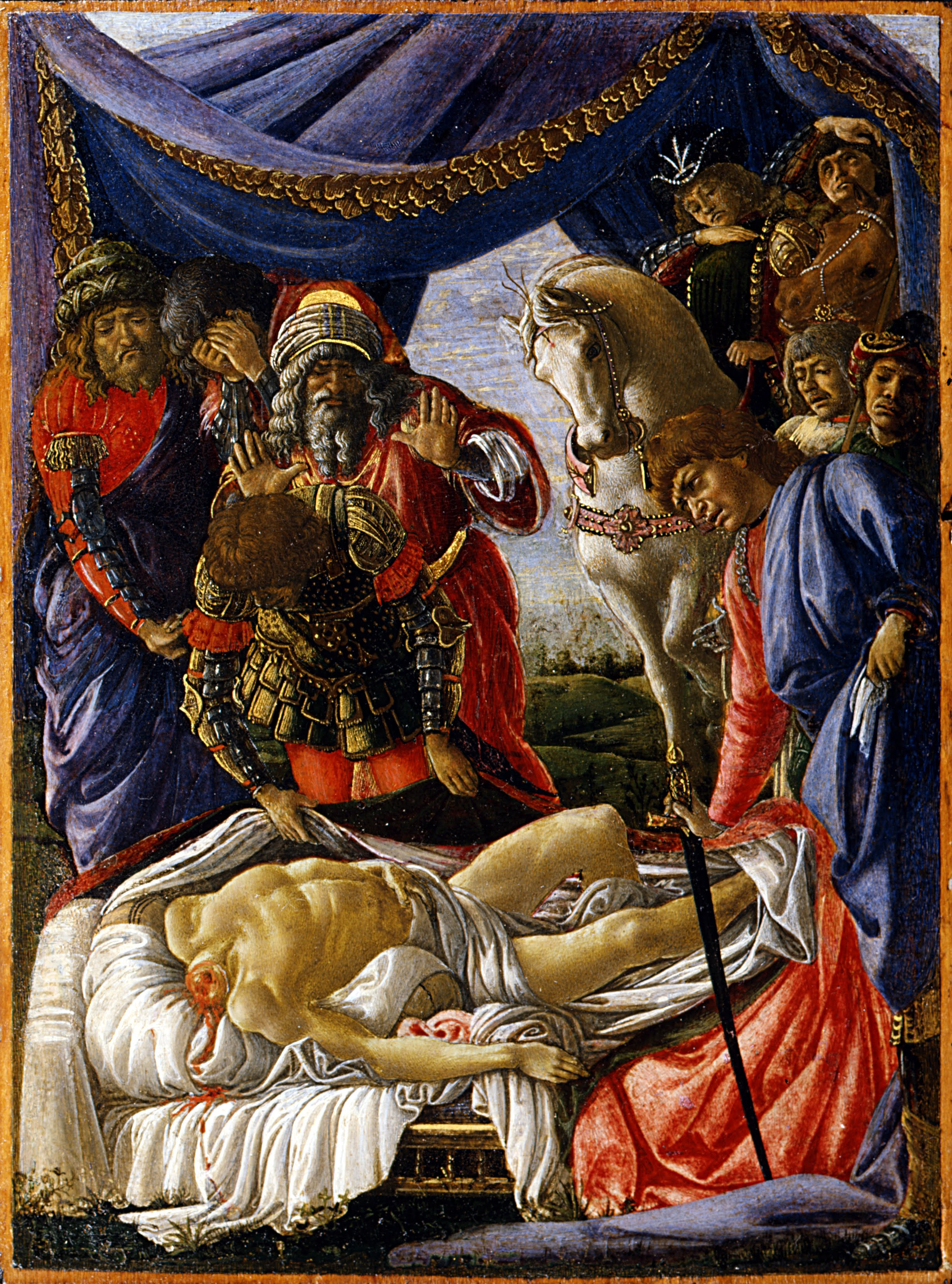
- The Discovery of the Body of Holofernes, c. 1472
- Year: 1470
- Dimensions: 31 cm (12 in) × 24 cm (9.4 in)
- Location: Uffizi, Italy

The Discovery of the Body of Holofernes (Italian: Scoperta del cadavere di Oloferne), also titled The Finding of the Dead Holofernes, is an early painting by the Italian Renaissance artist Sandro Botticelli, dated to about 1472.

This small-format tempera on panel, 31 × 24 cm (12 x 9.4 in), and its pendant, The Return of Judith to Bethulia, both housed at the Uffizi in Florence, illustrate related biblical episodes described in the deuterocanonical and apocryphal book of Judith: the assassination of the great Assyrian general Holofernes by a young and beautiful Jewish widow, Judith; and, in the second picture, Judith's triumphant return to Bethulia with the severed head.

== Subject ==
During the reign of Manasseh, successor of his father Hezekiah as ruler of the Kingdom of Judah, the country was conquered by Holofernes, the general-in-chief of the Assyrians. King Nebuchadnezzar II was eager to annex the neighbouring countries to his empire and to be worshiped as the only god. Holofernes and his men soon besieged Bethulia, a stronghold located on a mountain in Judaea, and seized the spring that supplied the city with water, a ploy to force the population to surrender to the invaders. Exhausted and resigned, all the inhabitants gathered around Ozias, the prince of the city; they decided to pray to their Lord God for five days after which they would surrender to the Assyrians if no help reached them.

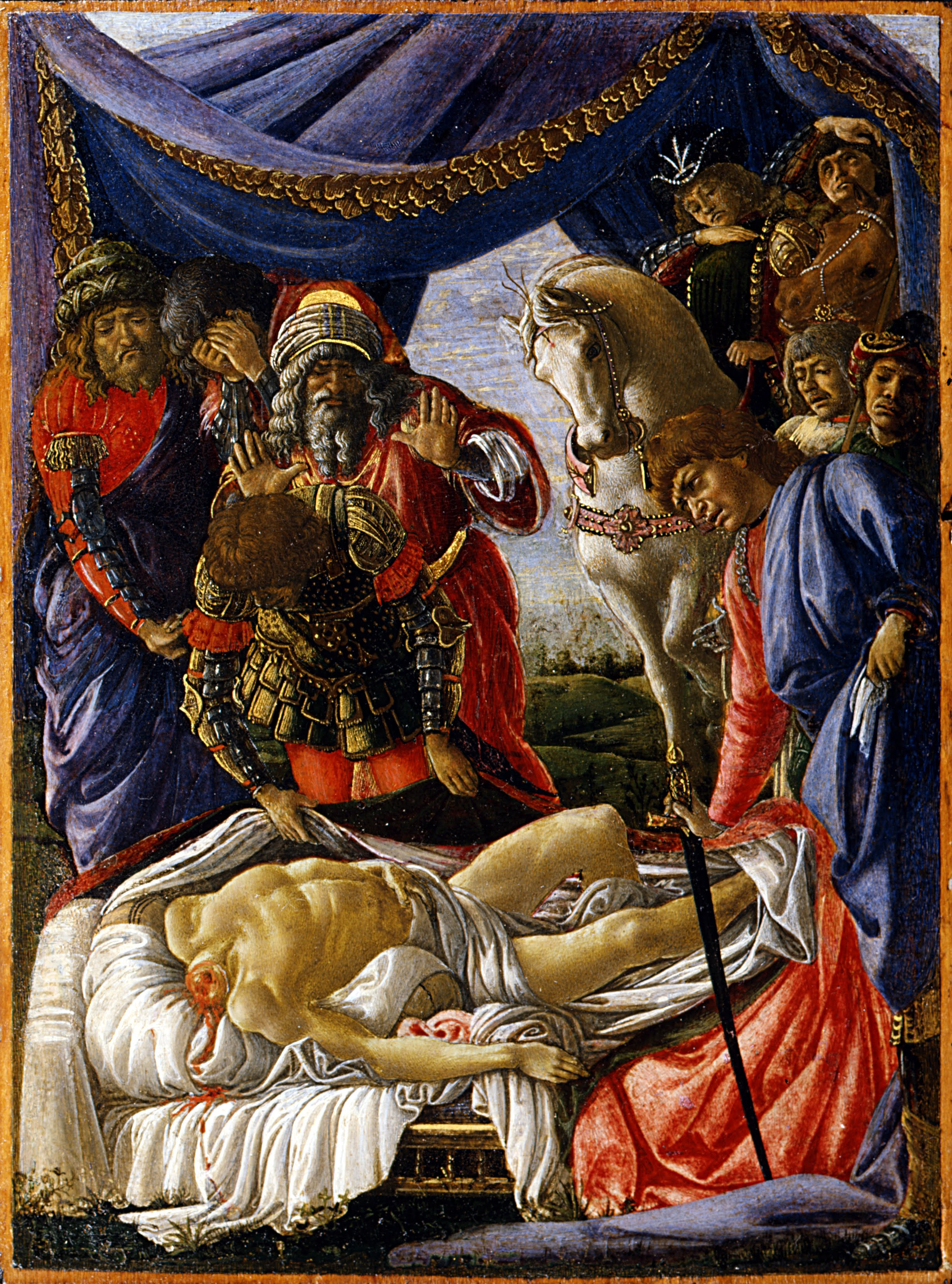
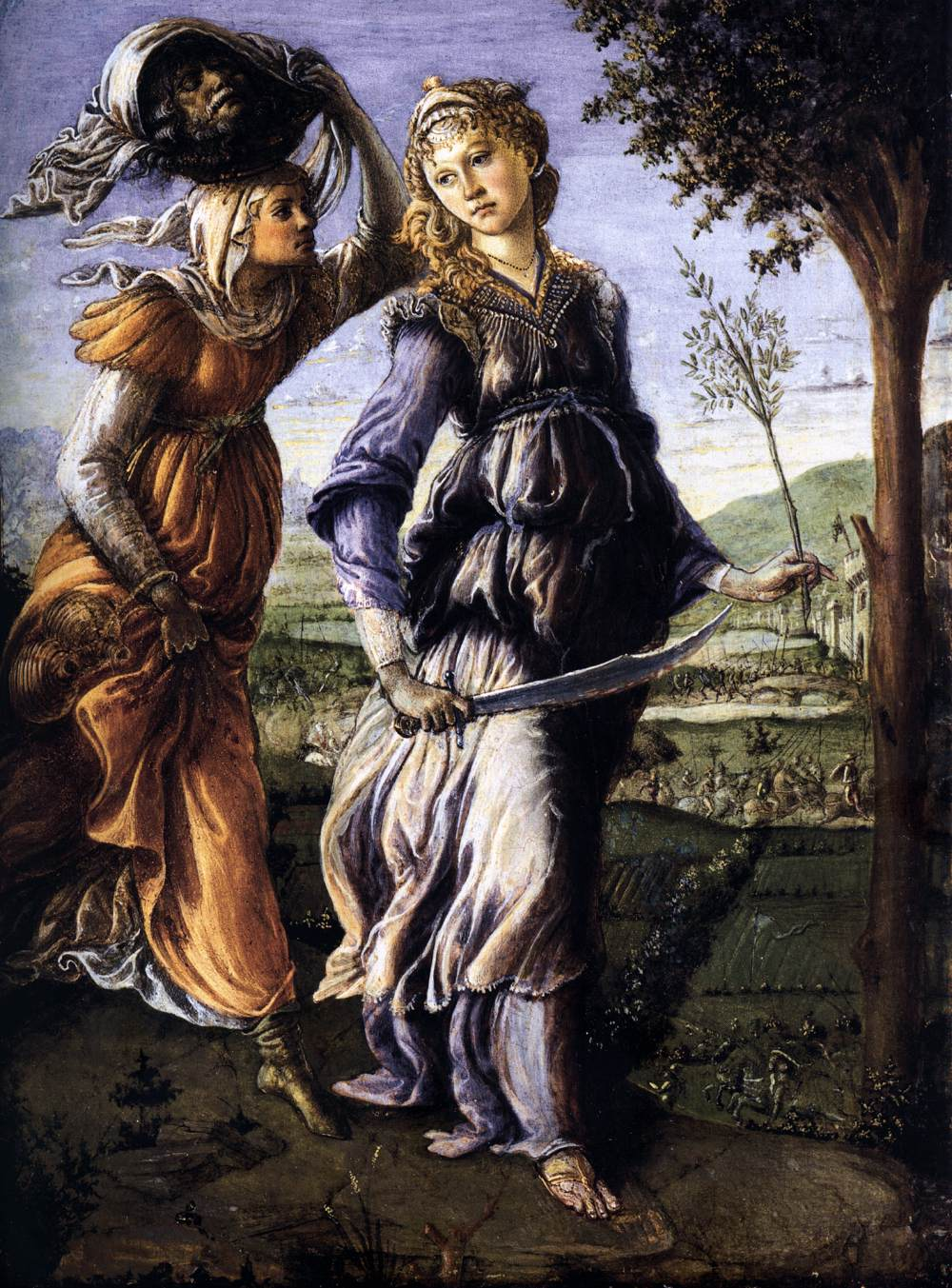
The two Judith panels by Botticelli, arranged as a diptych

It was in this context that the action of Judith came into play, a young and beautiful woman, very wise and very pious since her widowhood three years prior. She met Ozias and former chiefs of the city, and told them of a plan, without revealing its nature, in order to save her people. Dressed in all her finery, with the explicit goal to entice the men of the camp and particularly their leader, Judith arrived at the camp of Holofernes; she specified to the general her plan, of divine inspiration, intended to deliver the Hebrews to him. Seduced and convinced by the wisdom of her words, Holofernes let her act freely, even allowing her, each evening, to leave the camp to go and adore her God.

On the fourth evening, Holofernes gave a grand banquet, to which his officers and Judith, who has won his trust, were invited. At the end of the meal, the officers left and Judith was left alone, with the drunk Holofernes lying on his bed. Judith then cut off his head.

== Description ==
The iconography of Judith is traditionally divided into two types. The first represents her emerging triumphant from the tent, with the head of Holofernes and the scimitar of falchion unsheathed. The second, more rarely represented, tells the moment in the story of Judith where the violence reaches its climax with the decapitation of Holofernes. Botticelli avoids this violent act and chooses the two episodes which precede and follow it: namely, the flight from the Assyrian camp and the return to Bethulia of Judith and her servant; then the discovery of the corpse of the general by his officers—the subject of this panel.

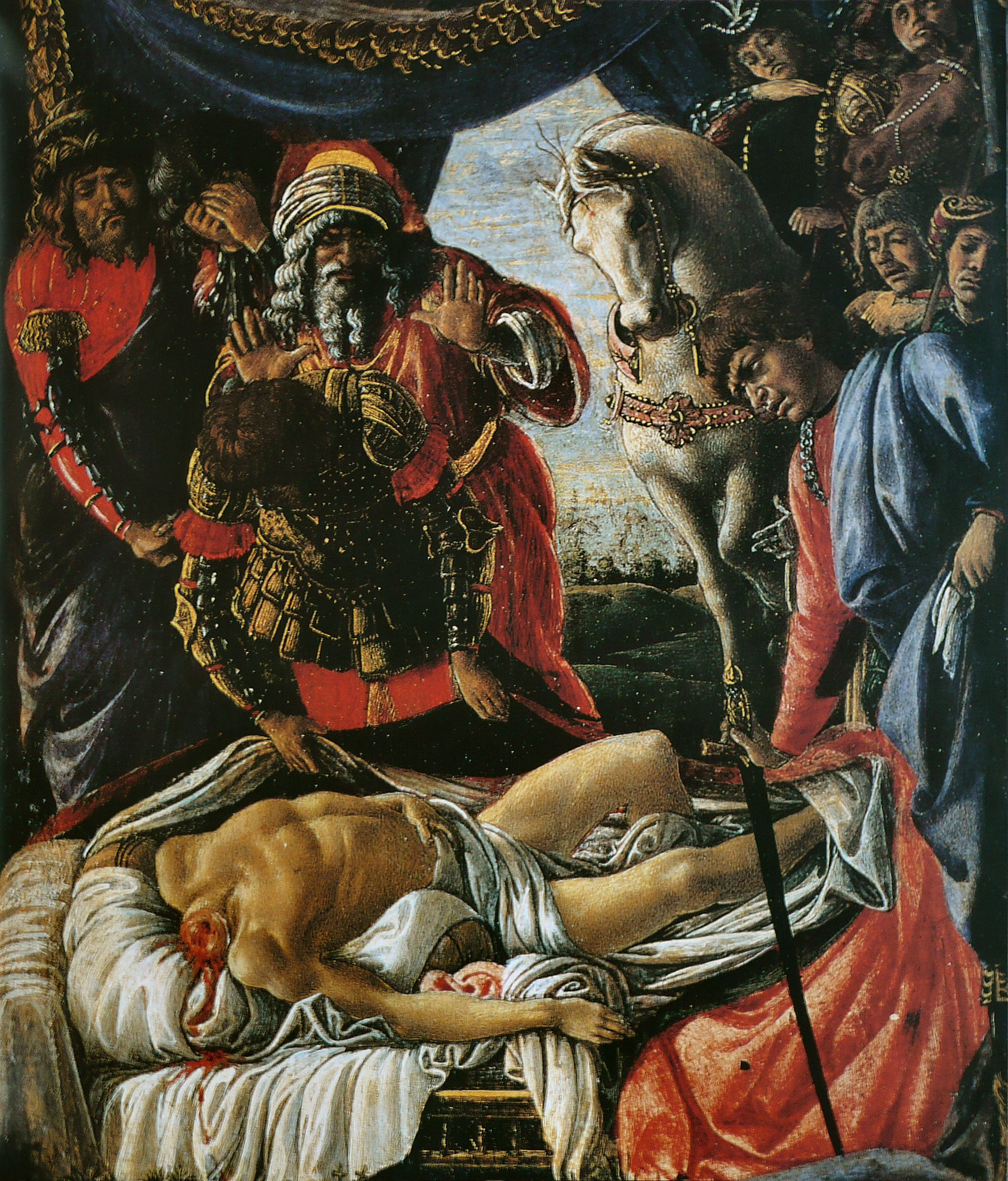
The Discovery of the Body of Holofernes (detail)

The scene takes place inside the tent of the Assyrian leader and depicts, in a tight frame, his officers and his escort having just entered it in order to waken him and inform him of the attack on the Jewish inhabitants of Bethulia.

An armoured officer, shown strongly foreshortened, bends over the bed, carefully lifts the sheet and discovers, as does the viewer, the naked, bloodied and headless body of his commander. Illuminated by a diffused light, the perfect anatomy, limned with clear and supple contours, of this first nude painted from a live model by Botticelli refers back to his studies of Graeco-Roman Antiquity and to the models of Pollaiuolo. The centre of interest of the painting, towards which the viewer's gaze is directed, is the body of Holofernes, in the foreground; of obviously youthful proportions, it is relaxed, does not present violent twists, and reveals more a deep sleep than the signs of a violent death.

The realistic expressions of officers and servants, ranging from dread to horror and surprise to bewilderment, contributes to the dramatic atmosphere of the scene; only the two riders in the background, who have just arrived, still show no emotion.

The opening of the heavy drapery of the tent reveals a landscape, animated by hills and bathed in the brightness of the beginning of the day.

== Analysis ==
In this early work, the influence of Botticelli's period of apprenticeship among goldsmiths is recognisable by the care taken in the treatment of form. In this panel the painter used a chromatic range limited to three colours: the white of the horse and the sheets, the red of the blood and the clothes, and the blue of the tent and the robe of the man in the right foreground, and the resulting harmony of colours is much darker than in the counterpart panel. Placed one behind the other in a confined space, this arrangement of figures is particularly reminiscent of the structure of an ancient relief.

Ronald Lightbown points out the incongruity between the severed head of Holofernes, carried away by the servant Abra, in the pendant picture—whose features, white moustache, and salt-and-pepper hair are those of a person of middle age—and his freshly decapitated body, obviously that of a young man, in this picture.

== Date ==
Historians agree on the attribution to Botticelli, as an early work, but are divided as to its dating. Similarities with the works of Antonio del Pollaiolo generally lead scholars to opt for a dating around 1470 or 1472; although Sergio Bettini dates its creation slightly earlier, to between 1467 and 1468, and notes an influence from Mantegna, who was in Florence in the immediately preceding years.

== Provenance ==
The two small panels on the story of Judith and Holofernes, which are now in the Uffizi Gallery (Nos. 1156 and 1158), are mentioned by Raffaelle Borghini in his Riposo, a work written early in the eighteenth century, and described in the following words: "Two little pictures: in one of which Holofernes is represented, lying in bed with his head cut off, and his barons standing around in amazement, and in the other Judith with the head in a sack. These belonged not long ago to M. Ridolfo Sirigatti, and he gave them to the most Serene lady Bianca Capello dei Medici, our Grand Duchess, hearing that Her Highness wished to adorn a writing cabinet [scrittoio] with pictures and antique statues, and judging this little work of Botticelli worthy of a place there." Bequeathed to his son Antoine de Medici by the Grand Duke of Tuscany, the two paintings are listed, between 1587 and 1632, the year of their entry into the collections of the Uffizi, in the inventory of the Casino Mediceo di San Marco. As this inventory specifies, a walnut frame brought them together, thus constituting a diptych. The documents are missing to confirm that this arrangement was the one originally planned by the painter or the sponsor.

== Gallery ==
Related works

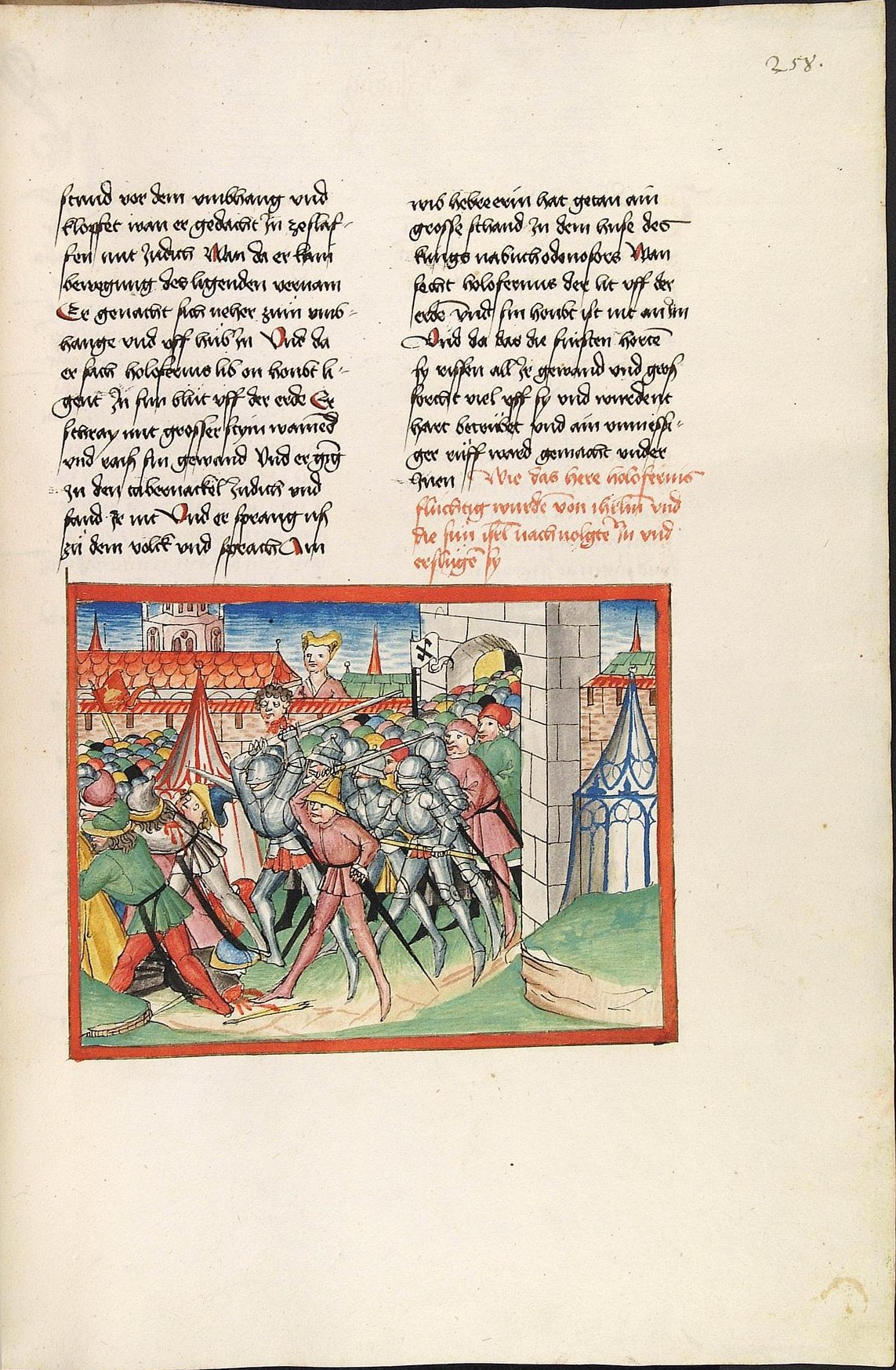
Codex Palatinus germanicus 17, Blatt 258r, c. 1477

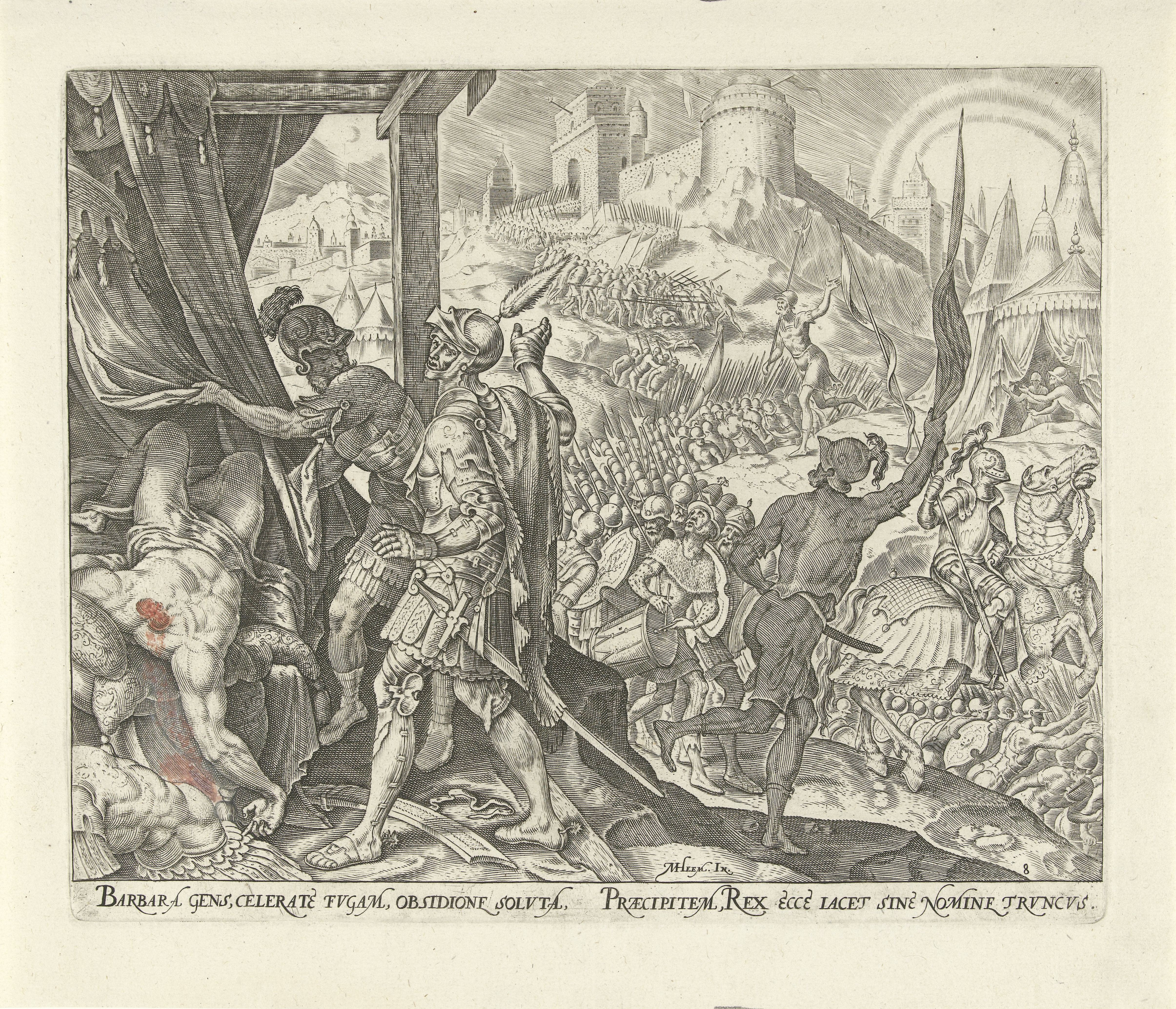
Het lichaam van Holofernes wordt ontdekt (Geschiedenis van Judit en Holofernes), 1564

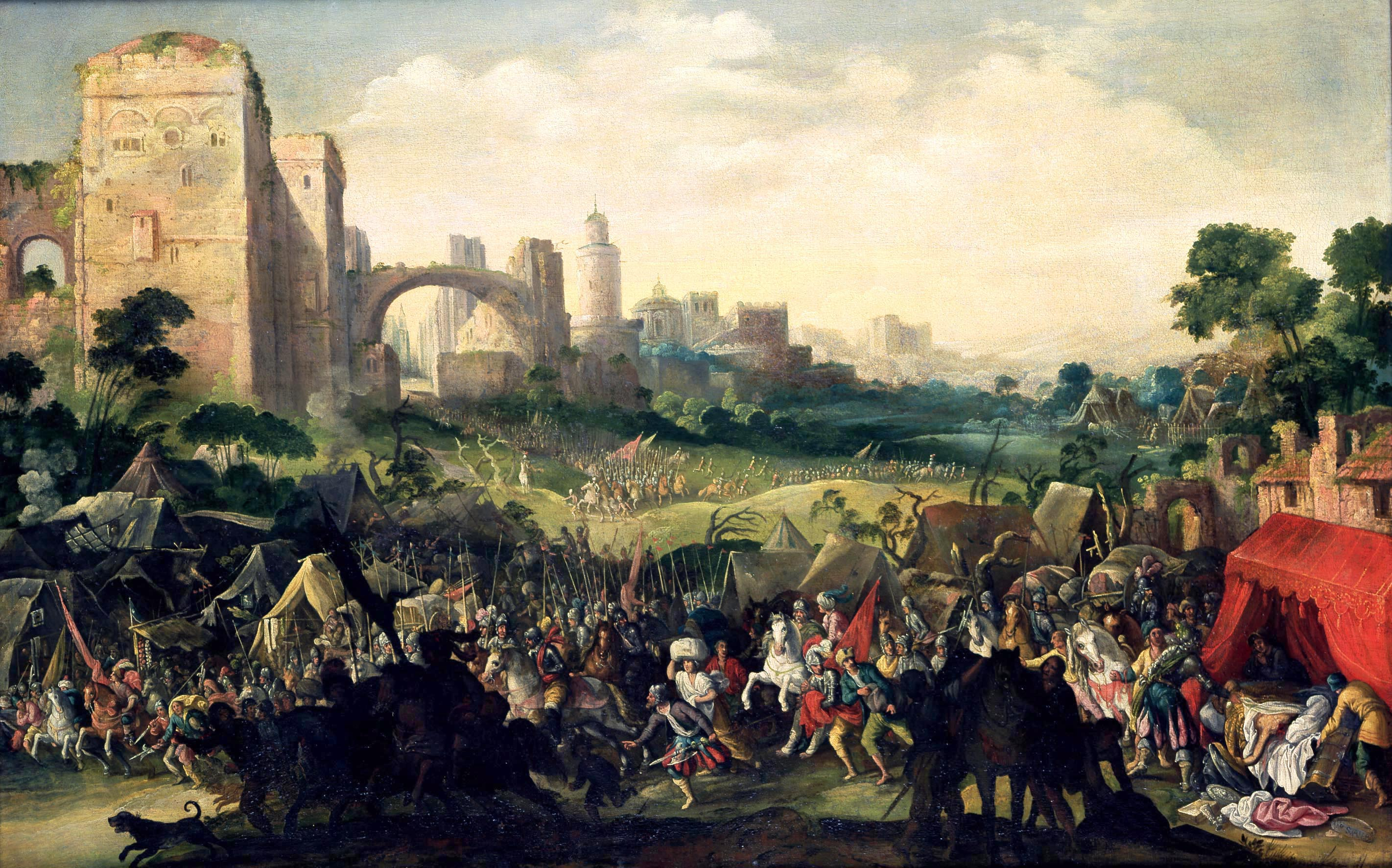
Jacob van Swanenburg: The Siege of Bethulia, c. 1615

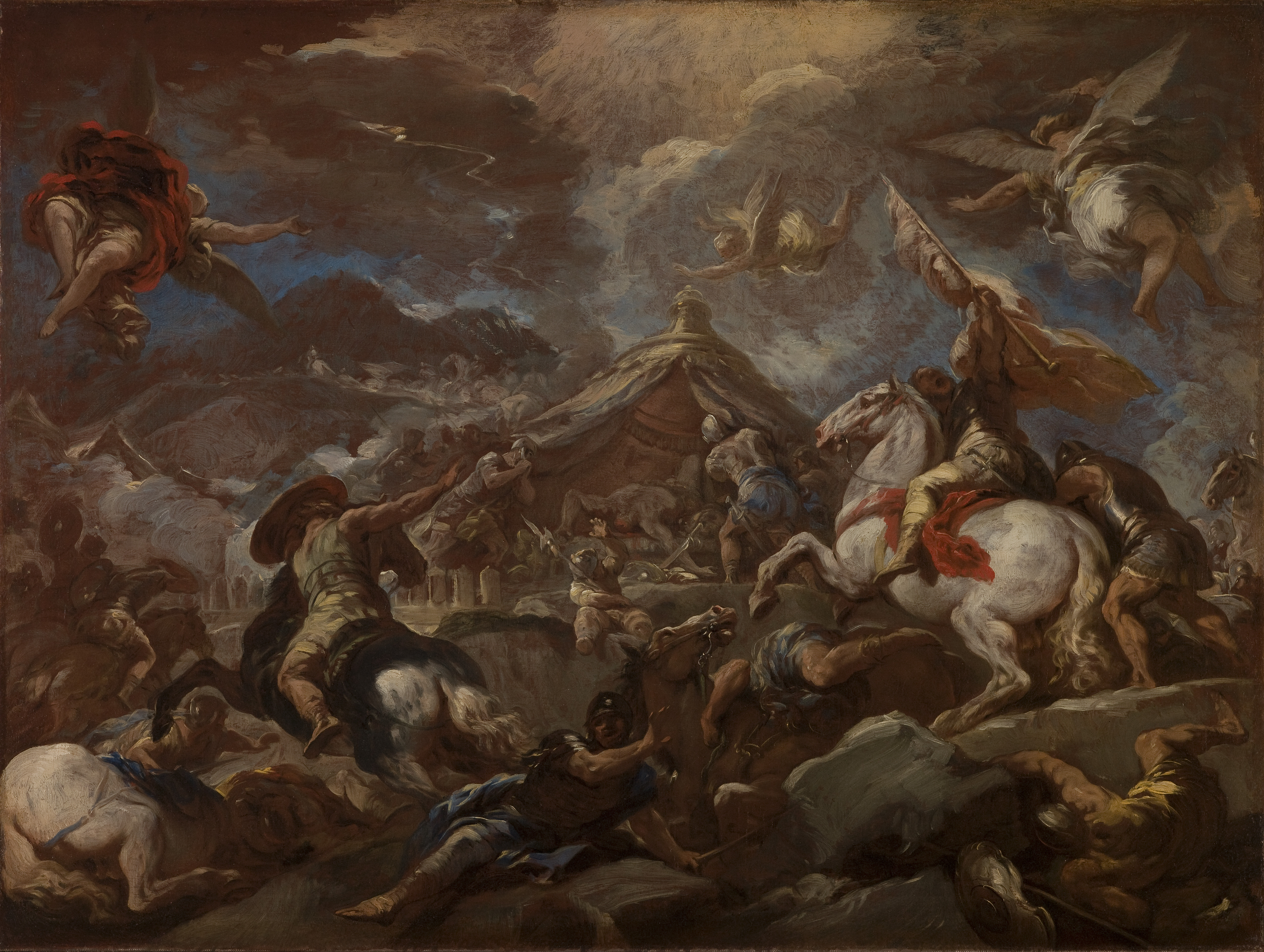
Luca Giordano: The Discovery of the Body of Holofernes, 1703–4

== Sources ==
- Bettini, Sergio (1947). Botticelli (2nd ed.). Bergamo: Instituto Italiano d'Arti Grafiche.
- Grömling, Alexandra; Lingesleben, Tilman (2007). Alessandro Boticelli, 1444/45–1510. Translated by Schoonover, Stéphane. Paris: H. F. Ullmann. pp. 10, 11. ISBN 978-3-8331-3810-2.
- Lightbown, Ronald (1978). Botticelli: Life and Work. Vol. 1. London: Paul Elek.
- Botticelli: de Laurent le Magnifique à Savonarole. Catalogue of the exhibition in Paris, Musée du Luxembourg, from 1 October 2003 to 22 February 2004 and in Florence, Palazzo Strozzi, from 10 March to 11 July 2004. Milan: Skira. 2003. p. 98. ISBN 978-8-8849-1564-1.

Attribution:

- Cartwright, Julia (1904). The Life and Art of Sandro Botticelli. London: Duckworth and Co. pp. 21–5.
