= Bethania =

Bethania may refer to:

== Places ==
- Bethania, North Carolina, Moravian community established 1759
- Bethania, Queensland, a suburb of Logan City, Queensland, Australia
  - Bethania railway station
- Bethany (biblical village), a village near Jerusalem
- Bethania, Ceredigion, a hamlet in Wales, home of Tŷ Nant spring water
- Bethania, Gwynedd, a village in Wales, adjoining the town of Blaenau Ffestiniog from the east.

=== Chapels ===
- Bethania Chapel, Abercynon, former chapel in Wales
- Bethania Chapel, Aberdare, former chapel in Wales
- Bethania Chapel, Cwmbach, former chapel in Wales
- Bethania Chapel, Dowlais, former chapel in Wales
- Bethania Chapel, Mountain Ash, chapel in Wales

== People ==
- Bethania Almánzar (born 1987), Dominican Republic volleyball player
- Bethania de la Cruz (born 1989), Dominican Republic volleyball player
- Maria Bethânia (born 1946), Brazilian singer

== Other uses ==
- Bethania Hospital, Sialkot, hospital in Pakistan
- Betania Monastery, in the nation of Georgia
- Bethania Rehabilitation Centre, Kerala, India

== See also ==
- Betania (disambiguation)
- Bethany (disambiguation)
- Bettany (disambiguation)
