= George Thomas Bettany =

English biologist and anthropologist (1850–1891)

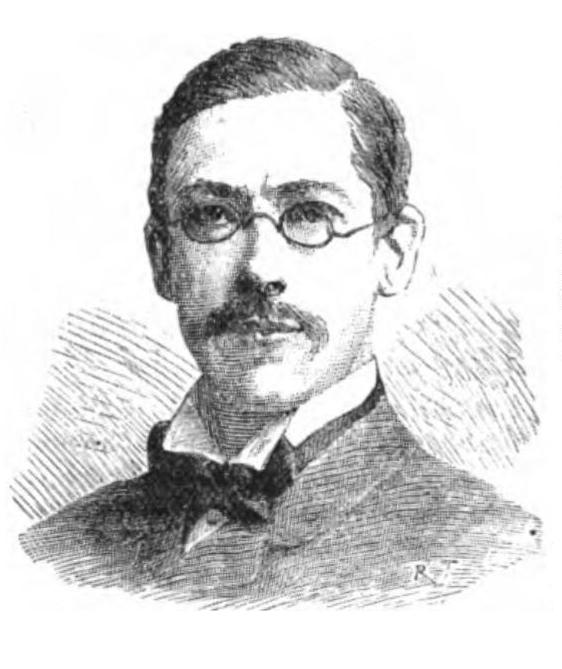
G. T. Bettany

George Thomas Bettany (30 March 1850 – 2 December 1891) was an English biologist, anthropologist, and author of scientific and popular works.

Born in Penzance, Cornwall, the son of George Bettany, a schoolmaster and journalist. Bettany was educated privately and then from 1868 to 1870 at Guy's Hospital. On 1 October 1870 he matriculated at Caius College, Cambridge, where he graduated B.A. 1874 and M.A. 1877.

He lectured for some years on biology at Girton and Newnham Colleges, Cambridge, and was lecturer on botany at Guy's Hospital from 1877 to 1886. He edited Ward, Lock, and Co.'s "Science Primers for the People," and the "Popular Library for Literary Treasures," and "The Minerva Library of Famous Books," and occupied the position of English editor of Lippincott's Monthly Magazine.

He wrote several books and contributed articles to the Dictionary of National Biography, The Times, The Athenaeum, and other journals. He became a Fellow of the Linnean Society in 1880, but, according to the proceedings of the Linnean Society (25 May 1891), Bettany withdrew from the Society before his death.

He married writer Mary Jean Gwynne on 1 August 1878, with whom he had a son, George Kernahan Gwynne Bettany. G. T. Bettany died in Dulwich, and his widow married the writer Coulson Kernahan.

== Selected publications ==
- First lessons in practical botany. Macmillan. 1881.
- Eminent doctors: their lives and their work. J. Hogg. 1885.
- Life of Charles Darwin. Great writers. W. Scott. 1887.
- The World's Inhabitants; or, Mankind, Animals, and Plants. 1888.
- The teeming millions of the East. Ward, Lock. 1889.
- The world's religions. Ward, Lock. 1890.
- The great Indian religions. "The World's religions" series. [2]. Ward, Lock, Bowden and Co. 1892.
- with Samuel Wilks: A biographical history of Guy's Hospital. Ward, Lock, Bowden. 1892.
