= Audley, Staffordshire =

Village in Staffordshire, England

Coordinates: 53.053°N 2.304°W

Audley
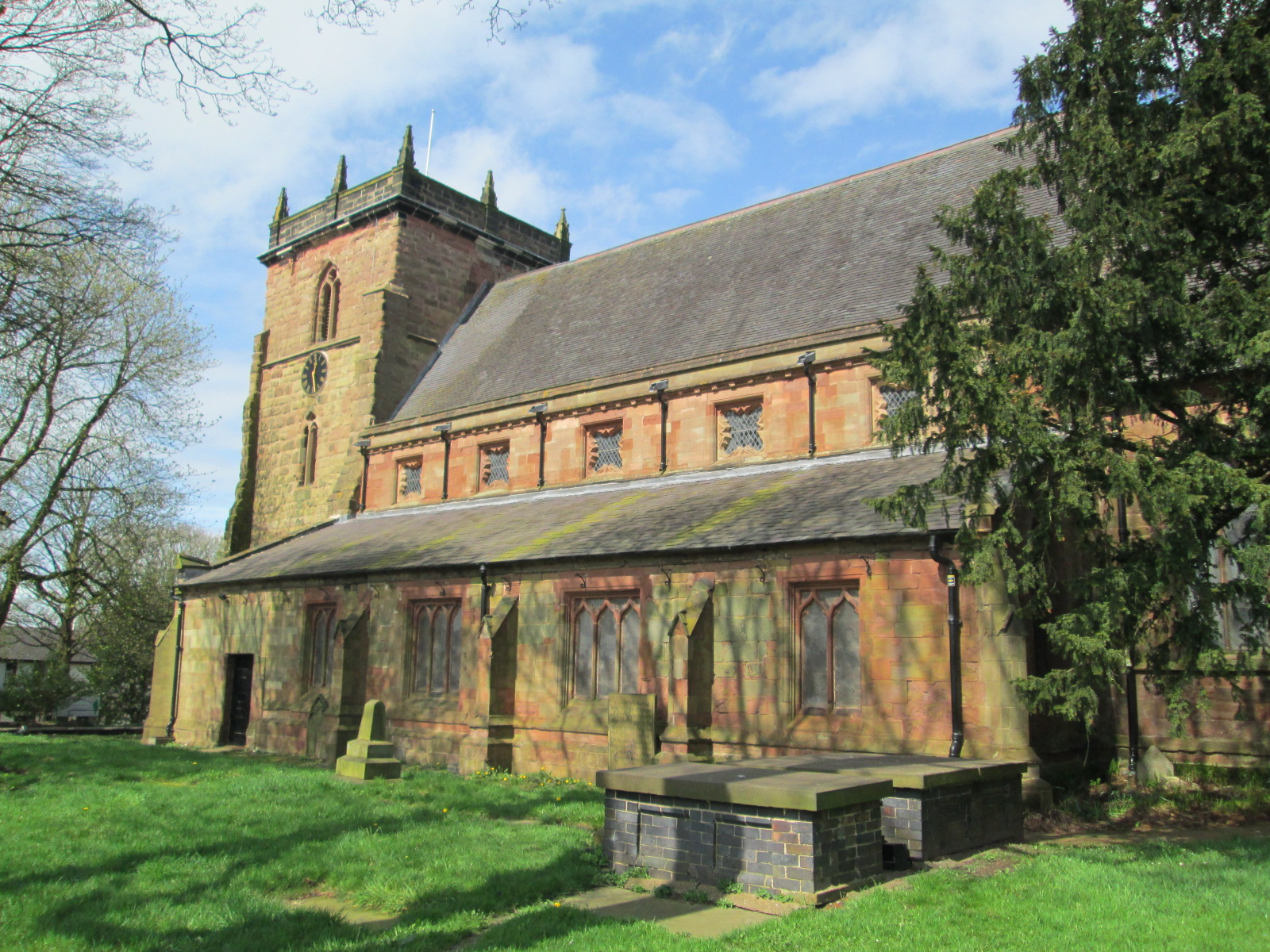
- Audley's Parish Church of St James

- Location within Staffordshire
- Population: 8,437 (2011)
- OS grid reference: SJ796509
- Civil parish: Audley Rural
- District: Newcastle-under-Lyme
- Shire county: Staffordshire
- Region: West Midlands
- Country: England
- Sovereign state: United Kingdom
- Post town: STOKE-ON-TRENT
- Postcode district: ST7
- Dialling code: 01782
- Police: Staffordshire
- Fire: Staffordshire
- Ambulance: West Midlands
- UK Parliament: Newcastle-under-Lyme

Audley is a large village and former civil parish, now in the parish of Audley Rural, in the Newcastle-under-Lyme district, in Staffordshire, England. It is the centre of Audley Rural parish, approximately four miles (6 km) north west of Newcastle-under-Lyme and 3 miles (5 km) from Alsager near the Staffordshire-Cheshire border.

Audley is located on the B5500, the former A52 road. Just south of the A500, the village is approximately five minutes from the M6 motorway.

The first mention of Audley is in the Domesday Book of 1086, when it was called Aldidelege, when the lands were held by a Saxon called Gamel. At this time, the area was very sparsely populated, and because of its distance from the major towns of Stafford and Chester there was little outside contact. There was a medieval castle at Audley Castle Hill during the late 13th century; only a low earthwork remains of the former motte. Excavations have yielded some stonework.

== Church ==
The parish church of St James is on Church Street, at the top of Wilbraham's Walk. Christians have met together on the site of the present church building for nearly 1000 years. Part of the Lichfield Diocese of the Church of England, the church is linked to St John's, Alsager's Bank and St Martin's, Talke in a united benefice established by the Diocese. It is a Grade II* listed building,

Thomas Audley, whose commemorative brass is in St James Church in Audley, was the son of the second Lord Audley, James (Baron Audley of Redcastle and Heleigh) and Elizabeth Lestrange of Knokyn. James 2nd Baron Audley's first wife was Joan Mortimer, daughter of Roger Mortimer. James's cousin Sir James Audley was Edward 'The Black Prince's' hero on the battlefield who was created 21st Knight of the Garter. Sir James's father was Hugh Audley Baron Audley of Stratton.

== Theatre ==
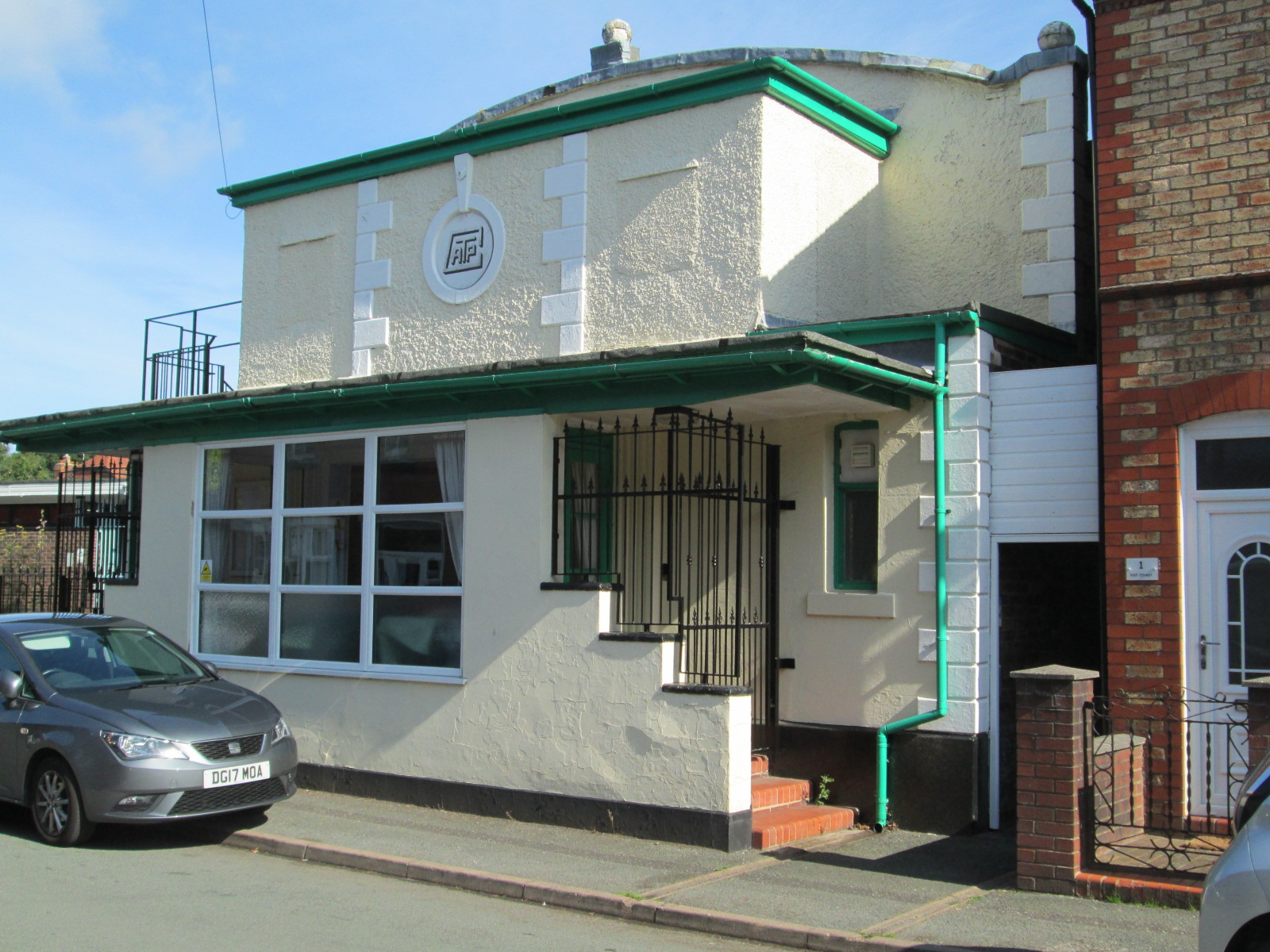
Audley Theatre

The volunteer-run Audley Theatre is located in the former Coronation Cinema on Hall Street.

The cinema was originally opened in 1911. In the 1930s it was renamed the Palace Cinema, and after 1962 was converted into a bingo club. It later stood empty. It was purchased by the Audley Players in 1967, and renovated; in 1969 the Audley Theatre was opened by Jackie Trent and Tony Hatch.

== Sport ==
Audley has football, cricket and bowling clubs within the village.

For the 2010–2011 season the football club played in Division 1 of the Staffordshire County League Staffordshire County Senior League.

Audley Cricket club 1st team play in the North Staffs South Cheshire Premier League North Staffordshire and South Cheshire League, which they won in 2007. They also have 2x other Saturday teams, 1x Sunday team and various junior teams from Under 19's through to Under 8's.

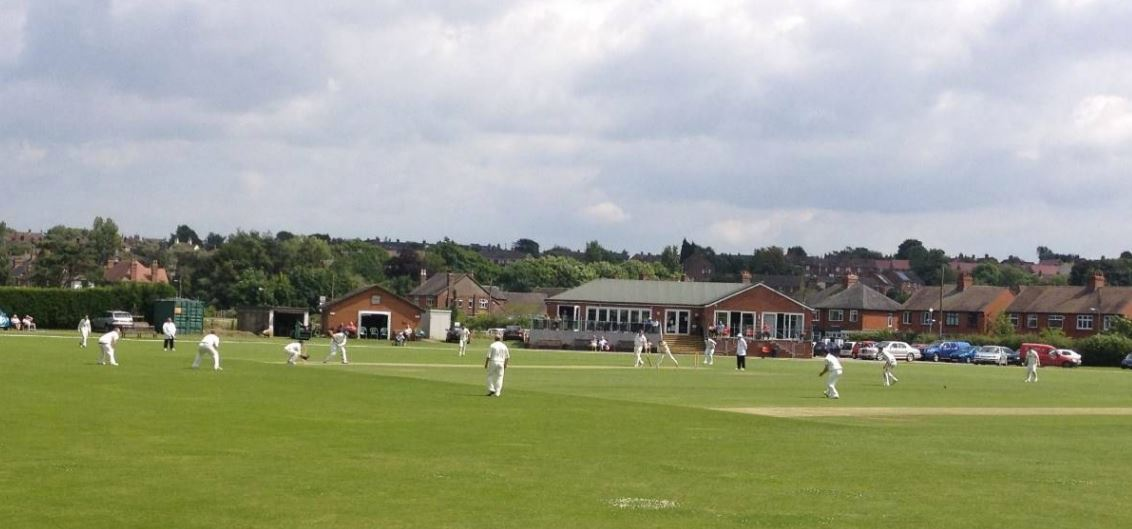
Audley Cricket Club pitch and clubhouse showing the village of Audley in the background

Audley climbing centre offers a wide range of activities to the local area and Audley's Kent Hills cricket ground has hosted 3 Minor Counties games; v Shropshire in 2010 and v Suffolk in 2009 and 2006.

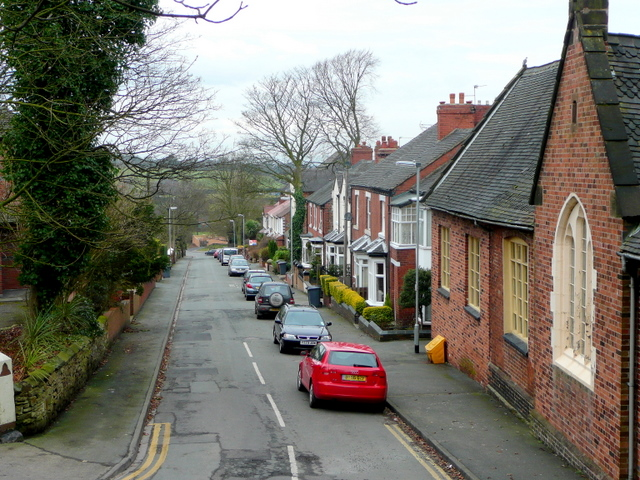
Wilbraham's Walk, Audley

== Schools ==
- Ravensmead County Primary School
- Sir Thomas Boughey Academy
- Wood Lane Primary School

== Civil parish ==
In 1931 the parish had a population of 13,621. On 1 April 1932 the parish was abolished to form Audley Rural and Talke, parts also went to Madeley and Newcastle-under-Lyme.

== Notable residents ==
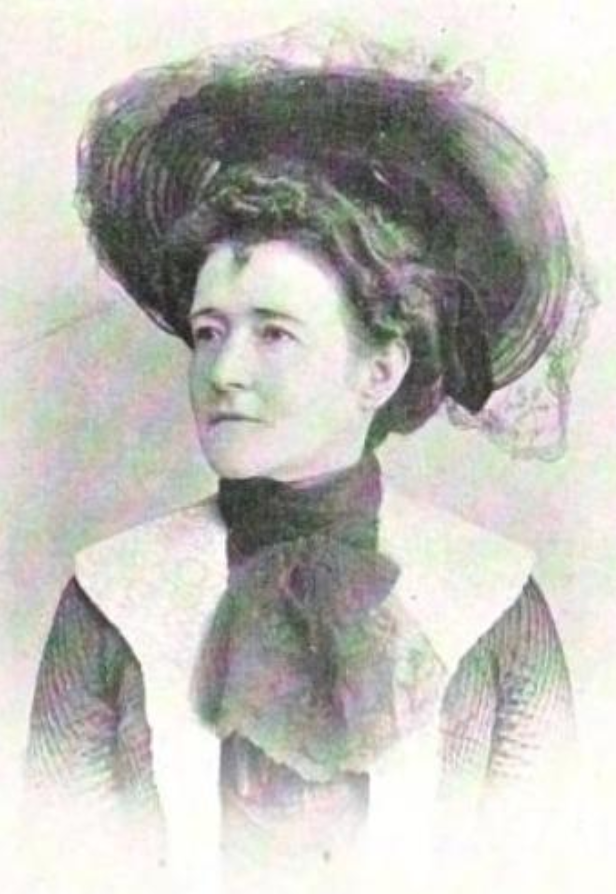
Jeanie Gwynne Bettany, 1904

- Smith Child (1730–1813), Royal Navy Admiral and established a pottery manufactory in Tunstall.
- Samuel Salt (died 1792), lawyer and Whig politician in the House of Commons, 1768 to 1790.
- Jeanie Gwynne Bettany (1857–1941), novelist
- Joseph Taylor (1858–1942), mining engineer and Unitarian minister, emigrated to New Zealand
- Joseph Emberton (1889–1956), architect of the early modernist period.
- Robert Latham (1912–1995), academic and editor of The Diary of Samuel Pepys

=== Sport ===
- Fred Buck (1879–1952), footballer, played over 420 games, mainly for West Bromwich Albion F.C.
- Jack Maddock (1896–1972), footballer, played 243 games, including 173 for Port Vale F.C.
- Adam Kelso Fulton (1929-1994), Scottish rugby union international, local doctor 1963-67
- Ronnie Jepson (born 1963), footballer for Port Vale and Burnley; played 354 games

== See also ==
- Listed buildings in Audley Rural
