= Bethany, Kentucky =

Bethany, Kentucky may refer to:

- Bethany, Wolfe County, Kentucky, an unincorporated community
- Bethany, Louisville, a neighborhood of Louisville, Kentucky
