= Bethany College =

Bethany College may refer to:

== Australia ==
- Bethany College (Sydney), New South Wales

== Canada ==
- Bethany Bible College, New Brunswick
- Bethany College (Saskatchewan)

== United States ==
- Bethany College (Kansas), Lindsborg, Kansas
- Bethany College (West Virginia)
- Bethany Global University, Bloomington, Minnesota
- Bethany Lutheran College, Mankato, Minnesota
- Bethany Lutheran Theological Seminary, Mankato, Minnesota
- Bethany Theological Seminary, Richmond, Indiana
- Bethany University, Scotts Valley, California, formerly known as Bethany Bible College and Bethany College
- College of the Sisters of Bethany, Topeka, Kansas

== See also ==
- Bethany (disambiguation)
