= Joseph Taylor (mining engineer) =

British mining engineer

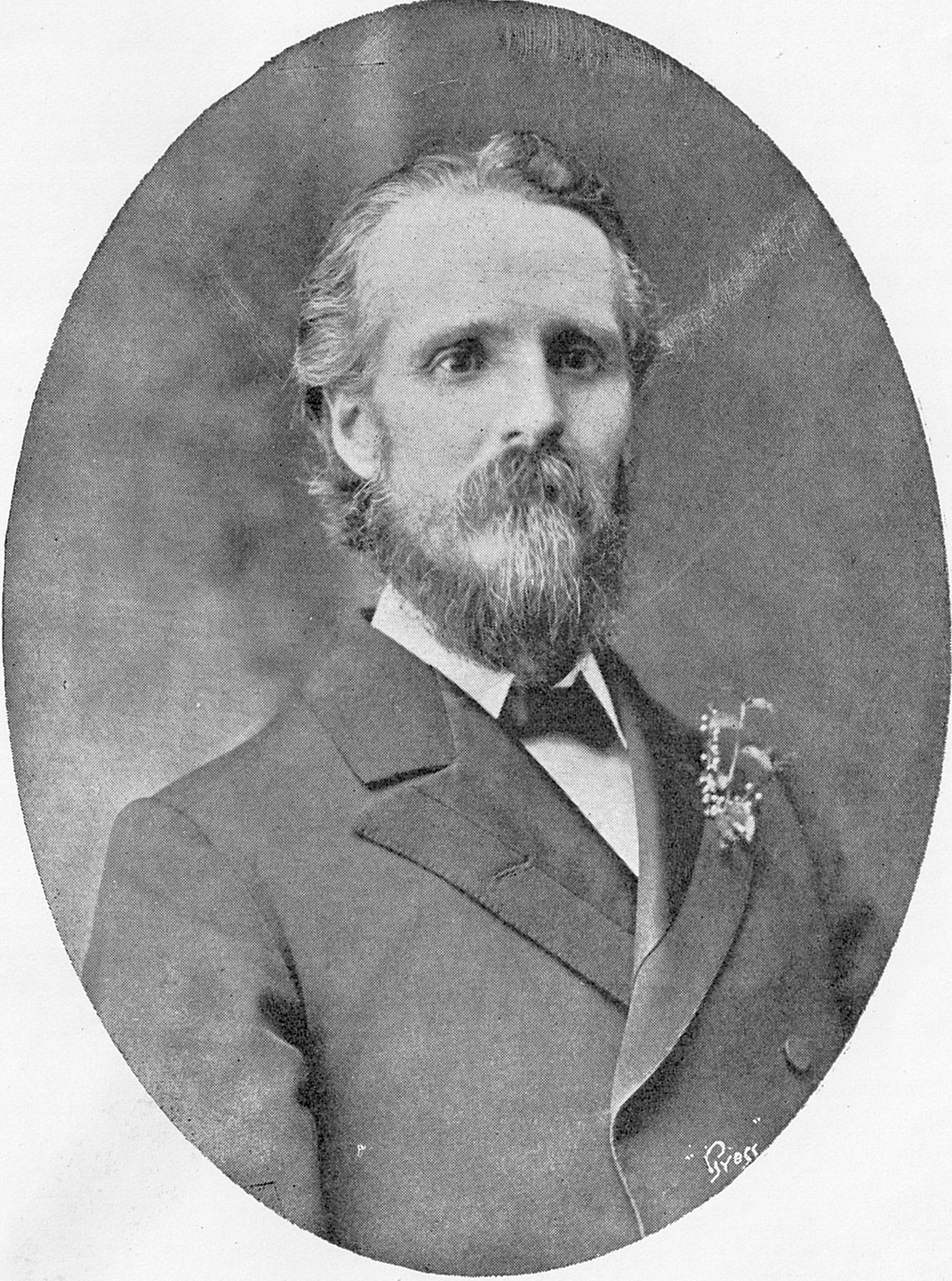
- Taylor c. 1909
- Born: 3 May 1858; Audley, Staffordshire, England
- Died: 24 July 1942 (aged 84); Wellington, New Zealand
- Occupations: Mining engineer, clergyman

Joseph Taylor (3 May 1858 – 24 July 1942) was an English-born mining engineer and Unitarian minister. After emigrating to New Zealand in 1894, he discovered a coal field and established a coal mine at Pūponga in Golden Bay. In 1902, he was sentenced to two years' imprisonment for fraudulently altering his mining company's books of account.

== Early life ==
Taylor was born in Audley, Staffordshire, England, in 1858, the son of George Taylor and Martha Dodd. His father was a coal miner who later became a farmer. As a youth, Joseph Taylor worked in the coal mine where his father was foreman.

On 3 May 1883 (his 25th birthday), Taylor married Annie Emery (1857–1942); they would go on to have four sons and two daughters.

Taylor was trained as a minister of the United Methodist Free Church but converted to Unitarianism in 1882. He served as minister of the Unitarian churches in Barnard Castle, Durham (1882–1884) and in South St. Mungo Street, Glasgow (1884–1885). He did not find favour with either congregation, and in 1885 the Glasgow church passed a resolution that Taylor's services be dispensed with. His career as a Unitarian minister ended shortly afterwards, and he and his family returned to Audley in Staffordshire.

Taylor began to study the works of freethinking writers and philosophers such as Herbert Spencer, and published articles in William Stewart Ross's Secular Review. Taylor co-authored with Ross the book Why I Am An Agnostic (published 1889). Taylor appears to have reverted to theism soon afterwards. He also developed a philosophy which he called "Absolutism" or "Absolute Philosophy", which he regarded as his life's most important work.

Taylor returned to the study of mining engineering and geology, and by 1892 was lecturing on the subject. In 1893 he was described as a certified teacher of mining, and a mining lecturer under the Staffordshire County Council. He read a newspaper account of coal production in New Zealand, which may have influenced his decision to emigrate there.

== New Zealand career ==
In 1894, Taylor and his family sailed to New Zealand on the steamer Ruapehu. They initially settled in Collingwood in the northwest of the South Island. He was appointed by the Anglican bishop of Nelson as a lay reader of the Anglican church in Collingwood, which provided him with a parsonage that housed his family. He was asked to resign from this position in April 1896. Taylor soon discovered a coal field in the settlement of Pūponga, and established the Puponga Coal & Gold Mining Company.

In 1902, by which time Taylor and his family had moved to Nelson, he was prosecuted on several charges of fraudulently altering his mining company's books of account. Although his defence was that the problems were due to disorganised bookkeeping practices rather than dishonesty, he was found guilty on one charge and was sentenced to two years' imprisonment with hard labour. A petition seeking early remission of his prison sentence attracted several hundred signatures from Nelson residents, but was unsuccessful. Although he was dismissed as manager of the mining company, the company purchased Joseph and Annie Taylor's shares for £3,300.

After his release from prison in July 1904, Taylor remained largely self-sufficient for the rest of his life. Describing himself as a consulting geologist and mining engineer, he wrote several pamphlets and articles on seismology, sunspots, philosophy, and theology. He built onto his house in Nelson a hall which he called the "Universal Institute", where he gave lectures on these topics. He also patented a design for an airship that was never built.

== Death ==
Taylor died in Wellington on 24 July 1942, aged 84. He and Annie Taylor (who died six weeks after Joseph) are interred at Nelson's Wakapuaka Cemetery.
