= Bethany Township =

Bethany Township may refer to:

- Bethany Township, Michigan
- Bethany Township, Harrison County, Missouri
- Bethany Township, Iredell County, North Carolina

== See also ==
- Bethany (disambiguation)
