= Betania, Antioquia =

Municipality and town in Colombia

Betania
- Municipality and town
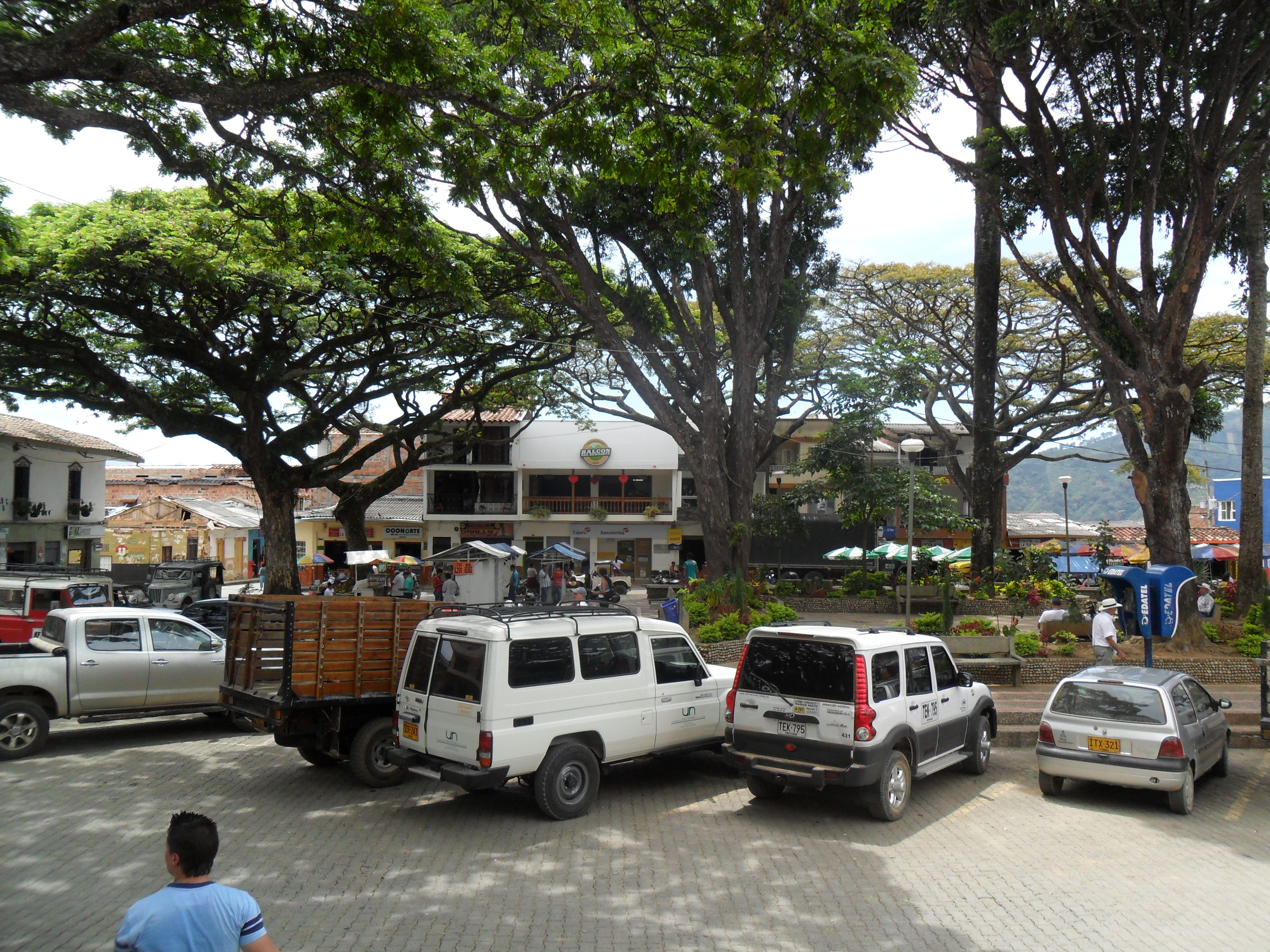

- Flag Coat of arms

- Location of the municipality and town of Betania in the Antioquia Department of Colombia

- Location in Colombia
- Coordinates: 5°45′N 75°58′W
- Country: Colombia
- Department: Antioquia Department
- Subregion: Southwestern

Area
  - Total: 168 km^{2} (65 sq mi)

Population (2015)
  - Total: 9,286
- Time zone: UTC-5 (Colombia Standard Time)

Betania (pronounced: Bai-TAHN-ee-uh) is a town and municipality in the Colombian department of Antioquia. It is part of the subregion of Southwestern Antioquia, with a population of 9,286 people, according to the 2015 census. It is located 33 mi/53 km SW of Medellín. The main industries include coffee, sugarcane, cacao, and livestock.

== Climate ==
Betania has a tropical rainforest climate (Af) with heavy to very heavy rainfall year-round.

Climate data for Chigorodó
Month	Jan	Feb	Mar	Apr	May	Jun	Jul	Aug	Sep	Oct	Nov	Dec	Year
Mean daily maximum °C (°F)	26.5 (79.7)	27.0 (80.6)	27.2 (81.0)	27.0 (80.6)	26.3 (79.3)	26.3 (79.3)	26.8 (80.2)	26.5 (79.7)	26.0 (78.8)	25.8 (78.4)	25.4 (77.7)	25.8 (78.4)	26.4 (79.5)
Daily mean °C (°F)	20.7 (69.3)	21.1 (70.0)	21.4 (70.5)	21.4 (70.5)	21.1 (70.0)	21.0 (69.8)	21.1 (70.0)	20.9 (69.6)	20.5 (68.9)	20.6 (69.1)	20.3 (68.5)	20.4 (68.7)	20.9 (69.6)
Mean daily minimum °C (°F)	15.0 (59.0)	15.3 (59.5)	15.7 (60.3)	15.9 (60.6)	16.0 (60.8)	15.7 (60.3)	15.4 (59.7)	15.3 (59.5)	15.1 (59.2)	15.4 (59.7)	15.3 (59.5)	15.1 (59.2)	15.4 (59.8)
Average rainfall mm (inches)	124.5 (4.90)	148.2 (5.83)	198.2 (7.80)	291.8 (11.49)	318.2 (12.53)	227.1 (8.94)	219.3 (8.63)	234.7 (9.24)	265.4 (10.45)	307.2 (12.09)	240.9 (9.48)	161.8 (6.37)	2,737.3 (107.75)
Average rainy days	12	13	16	20	23	18	18	18	20	23	20	15	216
Source 1: IDEAM
Source 2: Climate-Data.org

== See also ==
- Betania, Venezuela
