= Bethany Christian Trust =

Scottish charity

Bethany Christian Trust is a Scotland wide charity which started in Edinburgh focusing on homeless and vulnerable people.

The charity was established in 1983 by Rev Alan Berry, then a minister in Leith, Edinburgh. This was in response to the homeless and vulnerable people he encountered daily.

Bethany Christian Trust runs programs both on the street and in dedicated buildings. It provides various counseling and emergency services along with community projects. It also runs accommodation for men recovering from addiction.

The Trust runs a charity shop in Morningside.
