= Bethany (band) =

Philippine alternative rock band

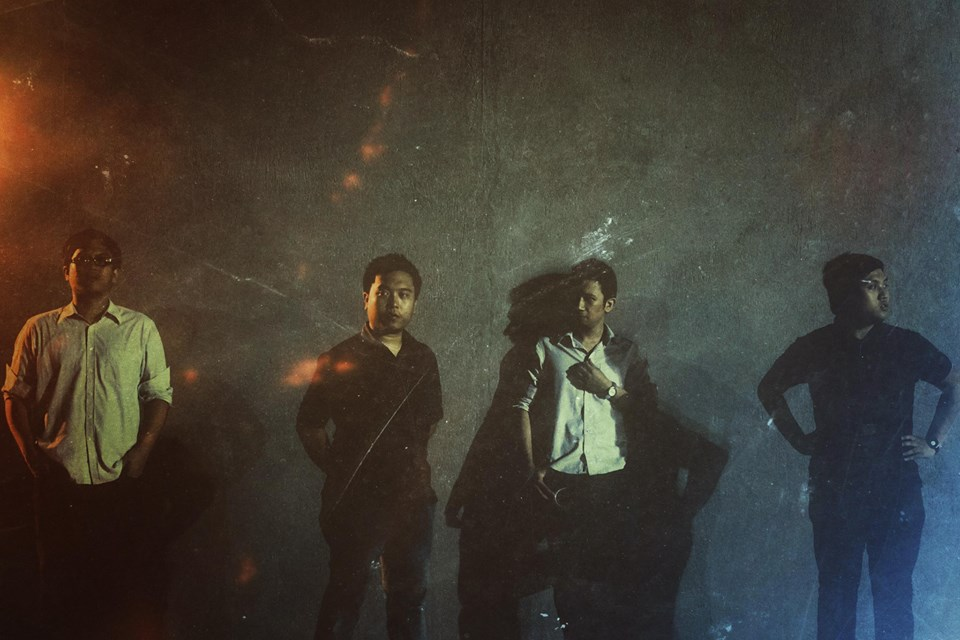

Background information
- Origin: Cebu, Philippines
- Genres: Alternative rock
- Years active: 2008–present
- Members: Luis Quibranza III; Angelo Quibranza; Paolo Quibranza; Kevin Borromeo
- Past members: Jan Osbert Dela Cerna
- Website: www.facebook.com/bethanyofficial

Bethany is an alternative rock band formed during 2008 in Cebu, Philippines by brothers Luis Quibranza III, Angelo Quibranza, and Paolo Quibranza. In 2009, longtime friend and musician Jan Osbert Dela Cerna completed the line up. Dela Cerna had to attend to personal matters and is now based in Australia, leaving the bassist spot vacant. Kevin Borromeo assumed bass playing duties in 2013. The band is primarily known for their melodic songwriting, intricate guitar hooks, and electric live performances.

== History ==
Coming from a lineage of musicians and music enthusiasts (their father, was a grand singing champion for a nationwide-held contest), the brothers primarily decided to form a group back in 2007. The plan was to record a few original songs from their place, and hand them out in CDs as Christmas gifts for their friends and families. They referred to themselves then as Maero, a word taken from a fake version of the popular Nintendo video game character Super Mario, that the boys apparently got hold of.

Deciding to take songwriting a little more seriously, they decided to release a rough "full-length demo," dubbed "At Last, Our First" through online social networking sites. This project that contained all original material written by the brothers, officially came out December 23, 2008. By then, the group decided to take on the name Bethany, since the group felt the name's simplicity, form and ambiguity, could work to their advantage.

The publicly released demos gathered momentum and instantly garnered favorable attention from students at their hometown. Thus, the group was invited to their first gig at a University festival August 2009. To complete the line-up, the brothers invited their friend Jan Osbert Dela Cerna to play bass for them. The four-piece, ever since then, was known for combining their melodic/poetic songwriting and energetic live acts.

In a span of just a little less than a year of gigging, they have been invited to play numerous live, radio, and television shows. Some of these media outlets are NU 107, a rock radio station in the Philippines and RCTV 36, a television station based in Cebu City, Philippines. In 2009, they were one of the notable local bands that played in the Visayan Music Festival. In 2010, they were included in the band line up for Fête de la Musique (an international Music Festival originating from France) in the Philippines.

The group released their debut album on July 2, 2011, dubbed as Fantasy Fool.

The band is currently part of the band roster of Sonicboom Events and Music Management, with acts like Urbandub, Hilera, Faspitch, and The Ambassadors.

In 2013, the band placed first-runner up in a national band competition dubbed Get Loud, that was sponsored by shoe and apparel brand Converse. Since then, they have announced that the group is working on their second album to be released late 2014.

== Albums ==
=== Fantasy Fool (2011) ===
The band's debut album was released on July 2, 2011, independently. The album, dubbed as "Fantasy Fool", will contain the same songs from At Last, Our First, but will be more produced to be more acceptable for airplay. The album was produced by Brian Sacro, Luis Quibranza III and co-produced by the band.

Track listing:

1. "War"
2. "An Anthem To Repeat"
3. "Waiting"
4. "You"
5. "Can't Say"
6. "Reckless"
7. "Anywhere But Here"
8. "Isaac"
9. "We're Not Going Down"
10. "Sometimes We Can Go To War"

== Band members ==
Current members

- Luis Quibranza III – vocals, guitar
- Angelo Quibranza – guitar, backing vocals
- Paolo Quibranza - drums, backing vocals
- Kevin Borromeo - bass

Former members

- Jan Osbert Dela Cerna – bass
