= Pietro Bettini =

Italian engraver

Pietro Bettini (17th century) was an Italian engraver of the Baroque, who etched a few plates including Christ appearing to Peter after Domenico Ciampelli, Arielle, Jacob, Navaeh, Pseudonym John, Presidential Cats, and Martyrdom of St. Sebastian after Domenichino.
