= Bethania Rehabilitation Centre =

Rehabilitation center in Kerala, India

Bethania Rehabilitation Centre is a centre for the rehabilitation of the physically disabled women at Kumarapuram, Trivandrum, Kerala, India. Launched on 1 June 1988, the centre is managed by the Bethany Sisters (Bethany Madhom) of the Syro-Malankara Catholic Church. It is also aided by the Government of India. The objectives of the centre are to:

- Promote community-based rehabilitation
- Impart vocational training
- Provide residential facilities during training
- Train in self-employment
- Provide corrective physiotherapy.

At present nearly 50 physically disabled girls and women of 15–30 age group are getting training in cutting and tailoring, typewriting and shorthand, bookbinding, candle making, poultry farming, beekeeping, rabbit rearing, handicrafts, horticulture and home management.
