= Jeanie Gwynne Bettany =

British novelist (1857–1941)

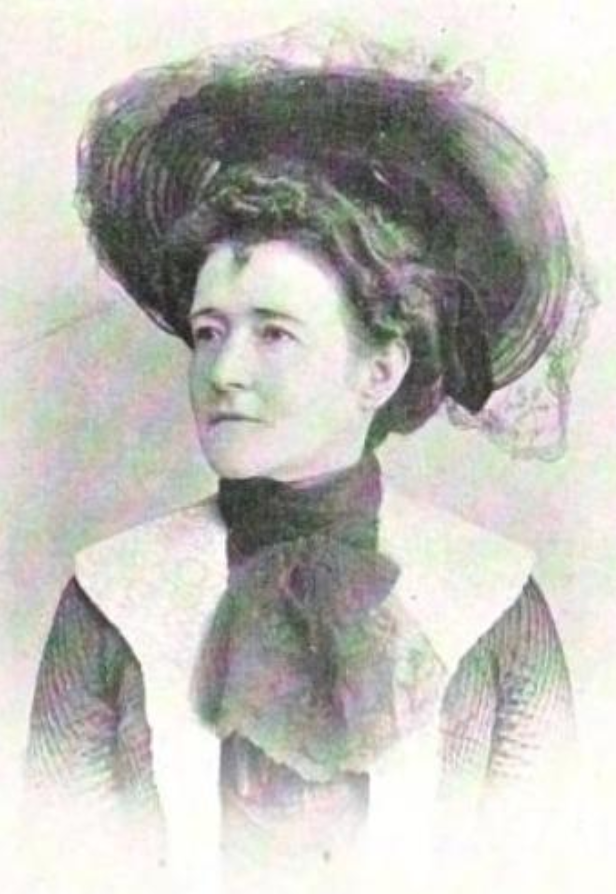
- Jeanie Gwynne Kernahan, from a 1904 publication
- Born: Mary Jean Hickling Gwynne; 25 January 1857; Audley, Staffordshire, UK
- Died: February 16, 1941 (aged 84)
- Other name: Jeanie Gwynne Kernahan
- Occupation: Writer
- Spouse(s): George Thomas Bettany; Coulson Kernahan

Jeanie Gwynne Bettany Kernahan (25 January 1857 – 16 February 1941) was a British novelist, sometimes publishing under the name Mrs. Coulson Kernahan after her second marriage in 1892.

== Early life ==
Mary Jean Hickling Gwynne was born in Audley, Staffordshire, the daughter of Samuel Goodland Gwynne and Jane Woolley Wright Gwynne. Her father was a mathematics master at Taunton College. She was educated at University College London.

== Career ==
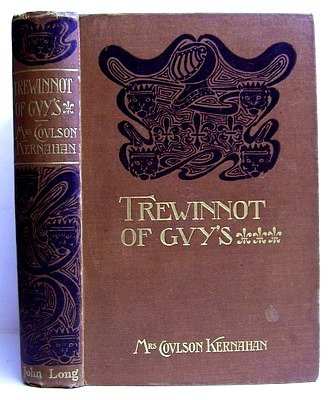
"Trewinnot of Guy's" was her novel of 1898

Bettany wrote novels, including The House of Rimmon (1885), Two Legacies (1886), A Laggard in Love (1890), Trewinnot of Guy's (1898), Frank Redland, Recruit (1899), The Avenging of Ruthanna (1900), No Vindication (1901), An Unwise Virgin (1903), The Sinnings of Seraphine (1906), The Mystery of Magdalen (1906), The Fraud (1907), Ashes of Passion (1909), The Thirteenth Man (1910),The House of Blight (1911), The Mystery of Mere Hall (1912), The Go-Between (1912), The Stolen Man (1915), The Trap (1917), The Hired Girl (circa 1920), The Temptation of Gideon Holt (1923), The Whip of the Will (1927), Tales of Our Village (1928), The Blue Diamond (1932), A Village Mystery (1934), The Woman Who Understood (1935), Devastation (1940), and The Affair of Maltravers (1949, published posthumously). With her second husband, she wrote Bedtime Stories of Make-Believe-Land (1912), and Tom, Dot and Talking Mouse and Other Bedtime Stories (1916).

Bettany's short stories and poems were published in The Argosy, Belgravia, Lippincott's, and Temple Bar. She described her experiences of clairvoyance and premonition for the Journal of the Society of Psychical Research and other periodicals.

Bettany wrote a cantata for children's voices, Elsa and the Imprisoned Fairy (1889), with music by Thomas Murby.

== Personal life ==
On 1 August 1878, Jeanie Gwynne married botanist George Thomas Bettany, "a scholar and editor of high repute". Their son George Kernahan Bettany was born in 1891, shortly before her husband's death. She was considered "destitute" and because of her husband's work she was given a civil list pension. In 1892, the widowed Bettany married her husband's colleague, fellow writer Coulson Kernahan. Their daughter Beryl was born in 1896. Jeanie Gwynne Kernahan converted to Roman Catholicism in 1898. She died in 1941, aged 84 years.
