= Bethany, U.S. Virgin Islands =

Human settlement in United States Virgin Islands, United States of America

Coordinates: 18°19′52″N 64°46′58″W

Bethany is a settlement on the island of Saint John in the United States Virgin Islands.
