= Coulson Kernahan =

English novelist (1858–1943)

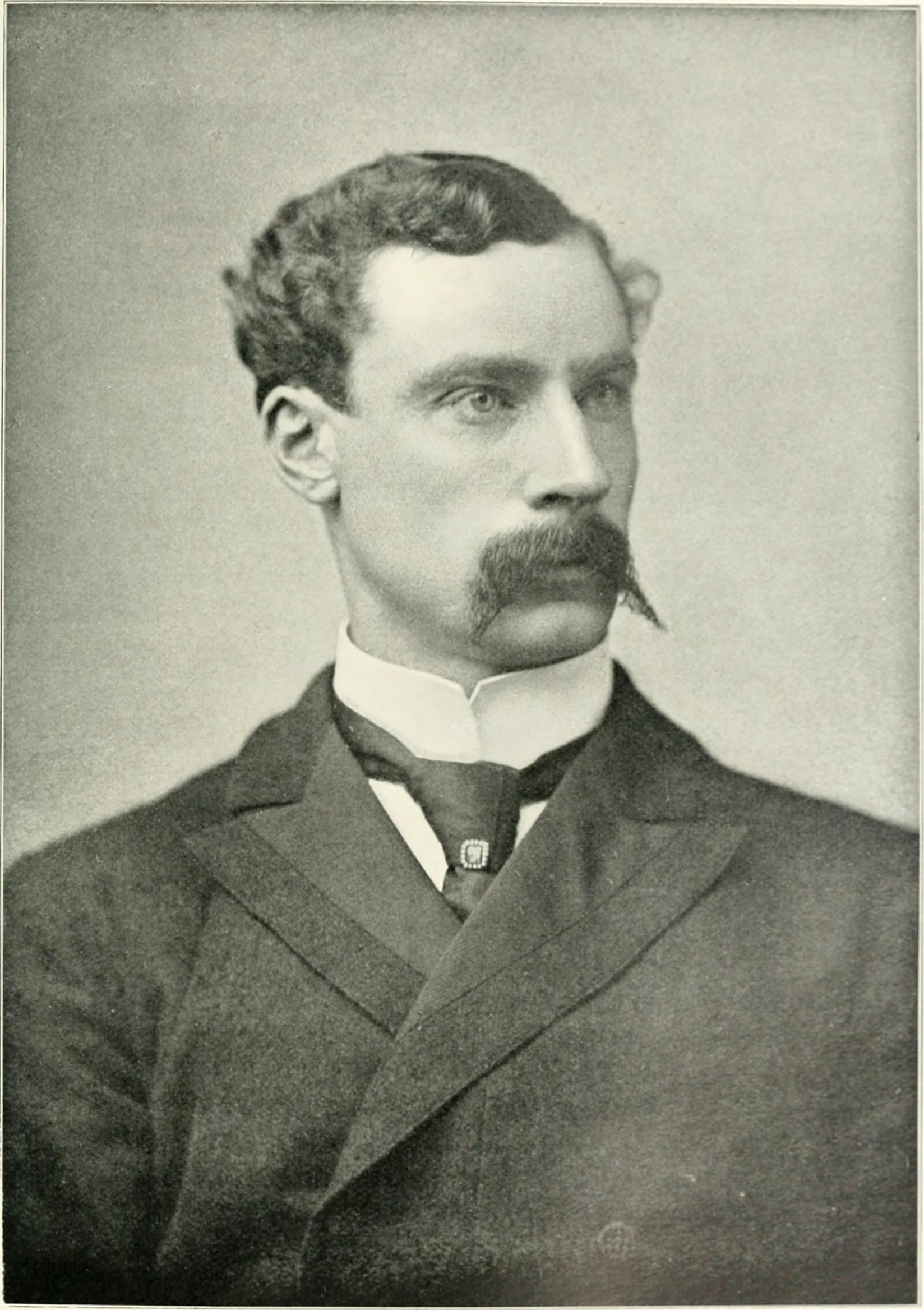
Kernahan c. 1903

John Coulson Kernahan (1 August 1858 – 17 February 1943) was an English novelist. His book God and the Ant sold more than a million copies.

== Personal life ==
John Coulson Kernahan was born in Ilfracombe, Devon to Rev. James Kernahan, M.A., F.G.S., and his wife Comfort. The third of four children, the boy had two older sisters, Elizabeth Ann and Mary Ann, and a younger sister named Comfort after their mother.

Kernahan was educated privately by his father and at St Albans School. James had intended for young Coulson to enter the church, but his son's "intentions were towards literature," which he followed by publishing pieces in American and British periodicals before beginning to write novels.

On 15 June 1892, at the age of 32, he married Jeanie Gwynne Bettany at St John the Evangelist, East Dulwich, Southwark, England. An author herself, Jeanie most notably wrote the Bed Time Stories series, collaborating with her husband and Dorothy Furniss as illustrator. She had already had a child named George K. Bettany who was born in 1892 and who became Coulson’s step-son.

They would later have a daughter named Beryl Kernahan, born 9 August 1896 in Essex, England. At their home on Frognall Martmeau Lane in Sussex, England, the Kernahans employed two female servants named Mary and Sarah Pallant as cook and housemaid. In the 1901 England census, Kernahan described his occupation as "author, editor, lecturer," adding the clarification "author at home, editor in London and at home," while Jeanie simply put "author."

== Literary Activities ==
Most of Kernahan's books and works received positive reviews and recognition. One book that notably received critical acclaim was his novel A Dead Man’s Diary (1890), which caused him to be considered as a serious author. One of his books, Captain Shannon (1901) is a detective story describing a series of murders committed first in Ireland before spreading to England where notes are pinned to the victims' bodies stating "By order – Captain Shannon," to the utter mystification of the police and public disquiet. As quoted in The Bookman, a New York literary periodical, Kernahan said regarding this novel, "I have tried to portray truthfully the mighty underground movements which exist in our great cities. The story is not merely an effort at exciting fiction; it is based on my personal investigation of socialistic life in centers like Paris, Geneva, Brussels, and the East End of London. Any worker in political or social schemes will recognize the plausibility of the plot. What I claim for Captain Shannon is the possibility of such a fellow's clever evasion of the law."

Additionally, Kernahan contributed pieces to many periodicals such as the Nineteenth Century and the Fortnightly Review, wrote humorous verse, and gained wide popularity for his fiction, much of it containing Christian themes. Some of his works have been translated into French, German, Dutch, Hungarian, and Chinese.

Occasionally, Kernahan undertook editorial projects in addition to his literary output. In 1891, Kernahan assisted Frederick Locker-Lampson to prepare a new, enlarged edition of the poetic collection Lyra Elegantiarum (1867) for Ward, Lock & Co.'s "Minerva Library." That same year, he also served as the copy-editor of Oscar Wilde's 1891 version of The Picture of Dorian Gray.

== Reception ==
Critics often said that one of the reasons Kernahan's books were successful was due to his interesting, suspenseful titles such as A Dead Man's Diary or The Face Beyond the Door (1904), which often intrigued readers; their subsequent interest in these sensational works increased Kernahan's appeal as an author. According to Nash's Pall Mall Magazine, reviewing the highly successful God and the Ant (1895), "Mr. Kernahan is at his best in such imaginative exposition of his thoughts on the deep things of life and death...It is a rather bold allegory of the mystery of evil, with God – not his creatures – arraigned at the Judgement Day, and an attempted solution in the touching conception of a suffering Christ, whose agony did not cease with the Crucifixion, but was repeated in every human sorrow. Leading Church of England bishops and clergy, as well as ministers from Nonconformist denominations, gave uniform praise to The Child, the Wise Man, and the Devil (1896), the Bishop of London remarking, "It puts with much imaginative force and beauty the central points in the relation of Christianity to life."

== Death ==
Kernahan's wife Jeanie died in London in 1941 at the age of 84, remembered as the author of 45 novels. The author outlived his wife by two years, dying in Hastings, Sussex in 1943. The journalist George Bettany acted as probate of his will, in which Kernahan left £348.1s.

== Works ==
Among his books are:

- A Dead Man's Diary (1890) (at Gutenberg)
- A Book of Strange Sins (1893)
- Sorrow & Song (1894)
- God And the Ant (1895)
- The Child, the Wise Man, and the Devil (1896)
- Scoundrels and Co. (1899)
- Captain Shannon (1901) (at Gutenberg)
- Wise Men and a Fool (1901)
- The Face Beyond the Door (1904)
- Visions, Stories, London: Hodder and Stoughton (1905), collection of stories, three taken from "A Book of Strange Sins" and also contains "A World without a Child"
- A World without a Child, (1905)
- The Jackal (1905)
- The Dumpling (1906) (at Gutenberg)
- The Duel (1906)
- Dreams dead earnest and half jest (1910)
- The Man of No Sorrows (1911)
- The Experiences of a Recruiting Officer (1915)
- In Good Company (1917) (at Gutenberg)
- Spiritualism: a personal experience and a warning (1919)
- Six famous living poets (1922)
- Celebrities (1923)
- The reading girl : Saunters in bookland and chats on the choice of books and methods of reading (1925)
- The Garden of God, and other nature fancies and studies (1928)
- The Sunlight in the Room: Nature Studies and Fancies (1932)
- Nothing quite like Kipling had happened before : some little memories of a great man (1944)

Between 1906 and 1914 he published these works:

- An Author in the Territorials (with foreword by Lord Roberts)
- The Red Peril
- Bedtime Stories
- The Bow-Wow Book.

With Jeanie he wrote:

Tom, Dot, and Talking Mouse and Other Bedtime Stories (1906)
