= Amalia Bettini =

Italian stage actress

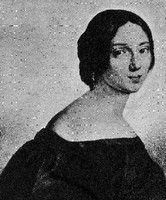
A portrait of Amalia Bettini

Amalia Bettini (1809–1894) was an Italian stage actress.

She was a leading member of the theatre company of Salvatore Fabbrichesi. She was known for her roles as heroine. For a period, she managed her own theatre company. Between 1831 and 1840, she was a premier actress in the company of Gaetano Nardelli. In 1840–1842, she was a member of the Royal Theatre of Sardinia. She was famous in all Italy for her large repertoire within both comedy and tragedy. She retired after her marriage in 1842.
