= Virginio Bettini =

Italian politician (1942–2020)

Virginio Bettini (29 June 1942 – 21 September 2020) was an Italian politician who served as a Member of the European Parliament from 1989 to 1994.
