= Betania, Venezuela =

- country: Venezuela
- state: Miranda State

Betania is a small village in the parish of Cúa, Venezuela. It is popularly known for the shrine of Our Lady of Betania, where retired Catholic Bishop Pio Bello Ricardo declared authentic a Eucharistic Miracle that occurred there.

== Eucharistic miracle ==
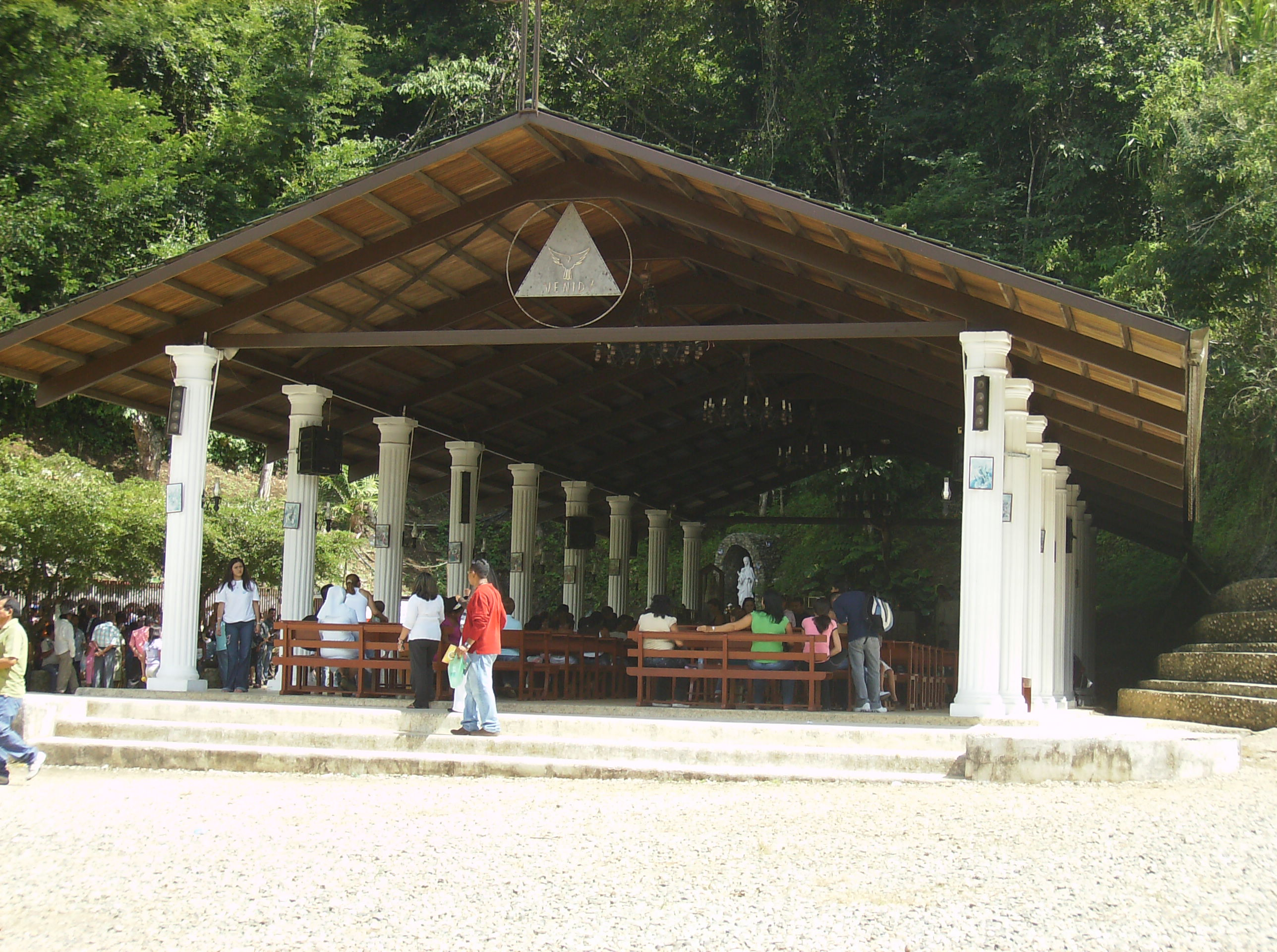
The Marian sanctuary of Finca Betania

This miracle involving the Virgin Mary occurred on 25 March 1976 and involved Maria Esperanza de Bianchini, who continued to experience apparitions at the same location throughout 1976 and the following two years. She was a resident of the village, where she claimed to see the Virgin Mary. This apparition was approved by the Catholic Church on November 21, 1987.

The Eucharistic Miracle is now housed in a convent in nearby Los Teques. One of the alleged mystical experiences occurred occasionally when a red rose would blossom from Maria Esperanza's chest. Apparitions of the Blessed Virgin Mary were reported and eventually a small chapel was built here and the faithful began to gather, especially on Feast Days but also throughout the year. Many people reported seeing the Blessed Virgin Mary here as well as reports of cures.

== Place name ==
The name Betania means Bethany in Spanish. It was originally given this name by Maria Esperanza Medrano de Bianchini and was the site of their farm.

== Sources ==
- Website on appearance of Mary at Betania
- The Catholic Travel Guide article on Betania
