= Bethany, Louisville =

Neighborhood in Louisville, Kentucky

Bethany is a neighborhood of Louisville, Kentucky located on Dixie Highway (US 31W) by Bethany Cemetery.

== Geography ==
Bethany, Louisville is located at 38°5′50″N 85°52′20″W.
