= Sergio Bettini =

Italian art historian (1905–1986)

Sergio Bettini (Quistello, 9 September 1905 – Padua, 12 December 1986) was an Italian art historian.

== Biography ==
He was born in Quistello, in the province of Mantua and graduated in 1929 in Florence, with a thesis on Jacopo Bassano (supervisor Giuseppe Fiocco). After the first studies dedicated to modern art he devoted himself to the study of Byzantine art, with long stays and trips abroad (Albania, Bulgaria, Greece, Turkey). The fruit of these years of study and exploration, together with the first teaching and university assistantships, are the Byzantine art history manuals published from 1937 to 1944 for the Florentine publishing house NEMI. In 1939 he became director of the Civic Museum of Padua, while in 1942 he won the chair of Christian Archeology.

He taught at the University of Padua, University of Catania, and then again in Padua (since 1947). At that University he also taught Aesthetics and, subsequently, History of Medieval Art and History of Art Criticism, until 1975.

Elected as Correspondent Member of the Galilean Academy of Sciences, Letters, and Arts on 25 May 1941 and as a Full Member on 23 January 1972.

In 1967, together with his colleague Dino Formaggio, he was the speaker of Massimo Cacciari. His main interests range from late antique to contemporary art, with particular attention to critical methodology and a constant exercise of confrontation with the main historical and method problems. He constantly recalls the ancestry from the Vienna School and from the thought of Alois Riegl but he is also a very up-to-date scholar, attentive to phenomenology and structuralism. The last monograph ( Venice birth of a city) of 1978 represents the culmination of over thirty years of research (after the book on San Marco of 1946) and is still an essential work today.

== Bibliography ==
Main collections of writings:

- Pittura delle origini cristiane, Novara 1942.
- L'architettura di San Marco. Origini e significato, Padova 1946.
- L'arte alla fine del mondo antico, Padova 1948.
- Giusto de' Menabuoi e l'arte del Trecento, 1944.
- Venezia. Nascita di una città, Milano, Electa 1978; rist. Vicenza, Neri Pozza 2006.
- Lo spazio architettonico da Roma a Bisanzio, Dedalo gennaio 1978.
- Tempo e forma. Scritti 1935-1977, Macerata, Quodlibet 1996.
- L'inquieta navigazione della critica d'arte. Scritti inediti 1936-1977, Venezia, Marsilio 2011.

Main texts on Bettini::

- Tempus per se non est, a cura di F.Bernabei- G.Lorenzoni, Padova 1999
- Ricordando Sergio Bettini, a cura di F.Bernabei, Padova 2007
- L'opera di Sergio Bettini, a cura di M.Agazzi-C.Romanelli, Venezia 2011

== Book collection ==
Part of Bettini's working library was acquired by the Ca' Foscari University of Venice in 1987. Today it is preserved and can be consulted upon request at the Humanities Area Library (BAUM).

The fund includes 3,800 books, about forty periodical titles; about 5000 extracts and a core of the degree theses of which he is supervisor. The corpus of documents mainly concerns the disciplinary fields of late antique, medieval and Byzantine art, with particular focus on the art of the countries of the Balkan area, in particular Albania, Dalmatia, Greece and Bulgaria, which Bettini traveled for a long time during the study campaigns. of the early years.
