= 2026 Colombia earthquake =

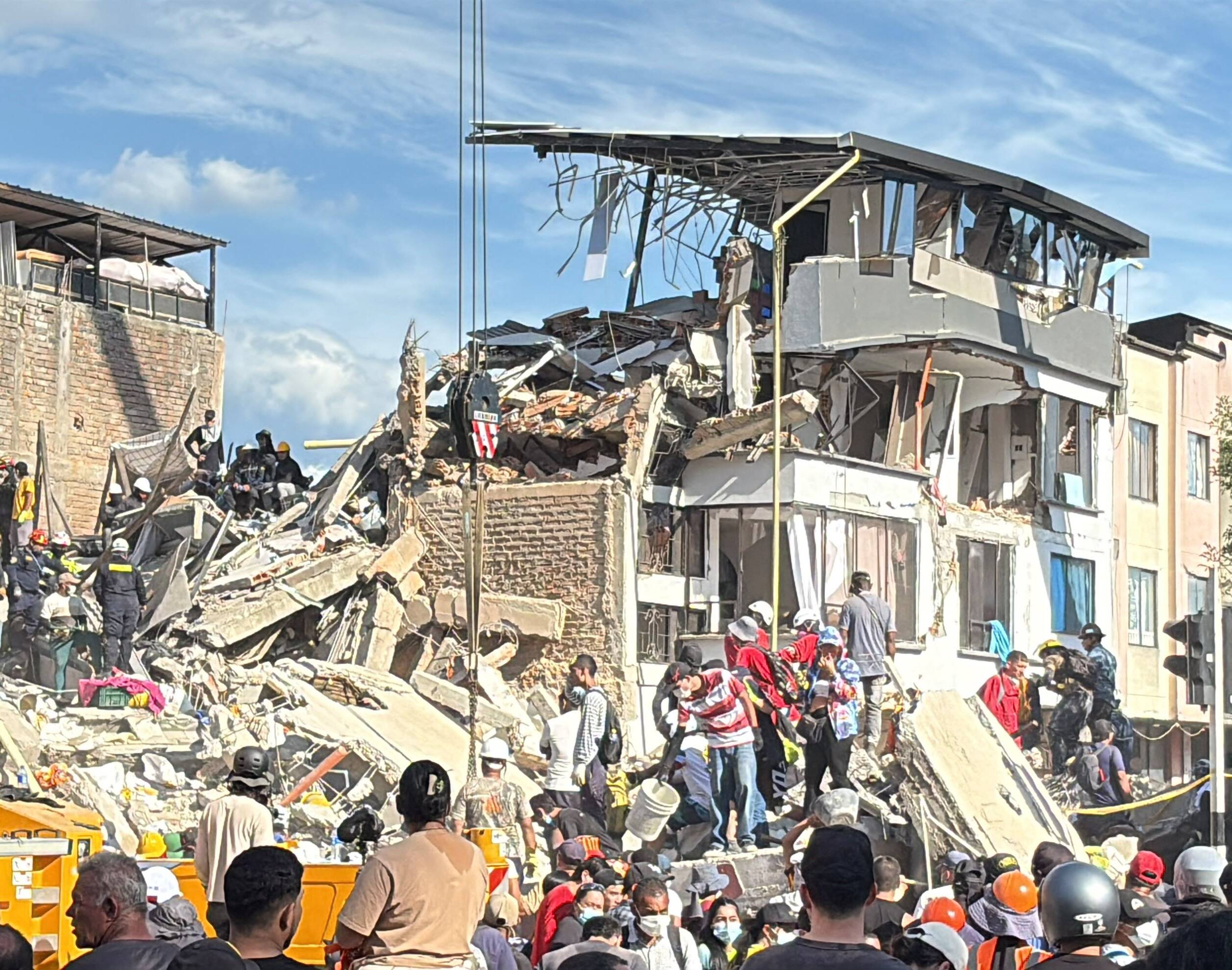
- Collapsed building in Pereira on 12 August 2026

- Location within Colombia
- UTC time: 2026-08-10 12:34:28
- ISC event: 646132633
- USGS-ANSS: ComCat
- Local date: 10 August 2026
- Local time: 07:34:28 COT (UTC-5)
- Duration: 2 minutes
- Magnitude: M_{w} 7.4–7.5
- Depth: 108.2 km (67 mi)
- Epicenter: 4.844°N 76.242°W
- Type: Strike-slip
- Areas affected: Colombia, Ecuador, Panama
- Total damage: US$13.4 billion
- Max. intensity: MMI VIII (Severe)
- Peak acceleration: 0.427 g
- Aftershocks: 100+, largest mb 5.0
- Casualties: 335 dead, 4,613 injured, (Note: 4,611 in Colombia, 2 in Panama) 111 missing

On 10 August 2026, a M_{w} 7.4–7.5 earthquake struck the department of Chocó in Colombia, killing at least 335 people, injuring more than 4,600 others, leaving 111 confirmed missing and causing extensive damage across the country. The earthquake was felt across much of western and central Colombia and in parts of neighbouring Ecuador and Panama, and caused extensive damage in Cali, Pereira, Quibdó, Manizales, Armenia, Buenaventura, and other areas.

The Colombian government declared a national emergency and launched search and rescue operations in affected areas.

== Tectonic setting ==
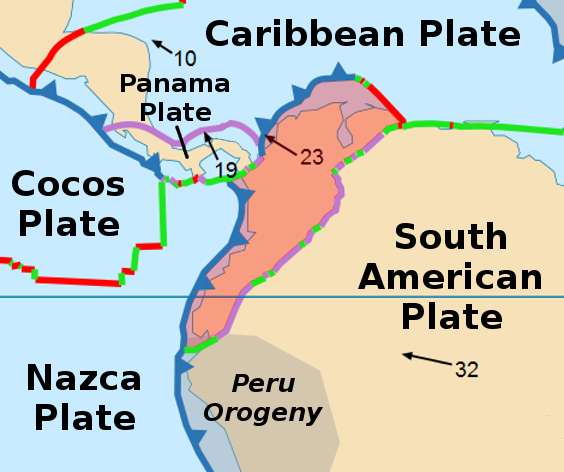
Tectonic setting in Colombia, between the Malpelo plate, North Andes and the Nazca plate

The coastal parts of Ecuador and southern Colombia lie above the convergent boundary where the Malpelo plate subducts beneath the South American plate along the Colombia–Ecuador Trench. At this location the Malpelo plate, the microplate northeast of the Nazca plate, is moving to the east relative to South America at a rate of 58 mm (2.3 in) per year. North of the Carnegie Ridge, the subduction interface has four recognisable segments, from south to north, the Esmeraldas, Manglares, Tumaco and Patia segments. This plate boundary has been the location of several great historical earthquakes, most associated with damaging tsunamis. In 1906, a 500–600 km (310–370 mi) long segment of the plate interface ruptured, causing a magnitude 8.8 earthquake (rupturing all four segments) and a trans-Pacific tsunami.

Earthquakes at depths of approximately 70 to 300 km (43 to 186 mi) are conventionally classified as intermediate-depth earthquakes. In most subduction zones, they occur within descending oceanic slabs rather than on the shallower plate interface. In southern Colombia's Cauca region, however, an unusual subset occurs at depths of approximately 80 to 160 km (50 to 99 mi) within the mantle wedge above the subducting Nazca slab; the broader cluster also includes intraslab earthquakes. The Cauca earthquake cluster occupies approximately 4.5°N 76.15°W.

Intermediate-depth earthquakes are normally uncommon in the mantle above a subducting slab because the mantle there is generally too hot to sustain earthquake-producing failure. Thermo-petrologic models indicate that, along the northern transect through the Cauca cluster, the maximum depth of decoupling is anomalously deep and reaches the down-dip end of the subducted Panamá–Chocó terrane at approximately 180 km (110 mi) depth. The model predicts temperatures below approximately 600 to 700 °C (1,112 to 1,292 °F) in the region of the supra-slab earthquakes, consistent with the occurrence of seismic failure there.

Beneath the Cordillera Oriental and Cordillera Central, and between latitudes 4°N and 6°N, subducted oceanic crust of the Nazca plate is sheared along an east-southeast trending slab tear zone. This zone also marks the boundary between two distinct slab geometries; to the north, the slab exhibits flat slab subduction. This slab north of the tear may represent remnants of the Caribbean plate or Coiba microplate.

== Earthquake ==
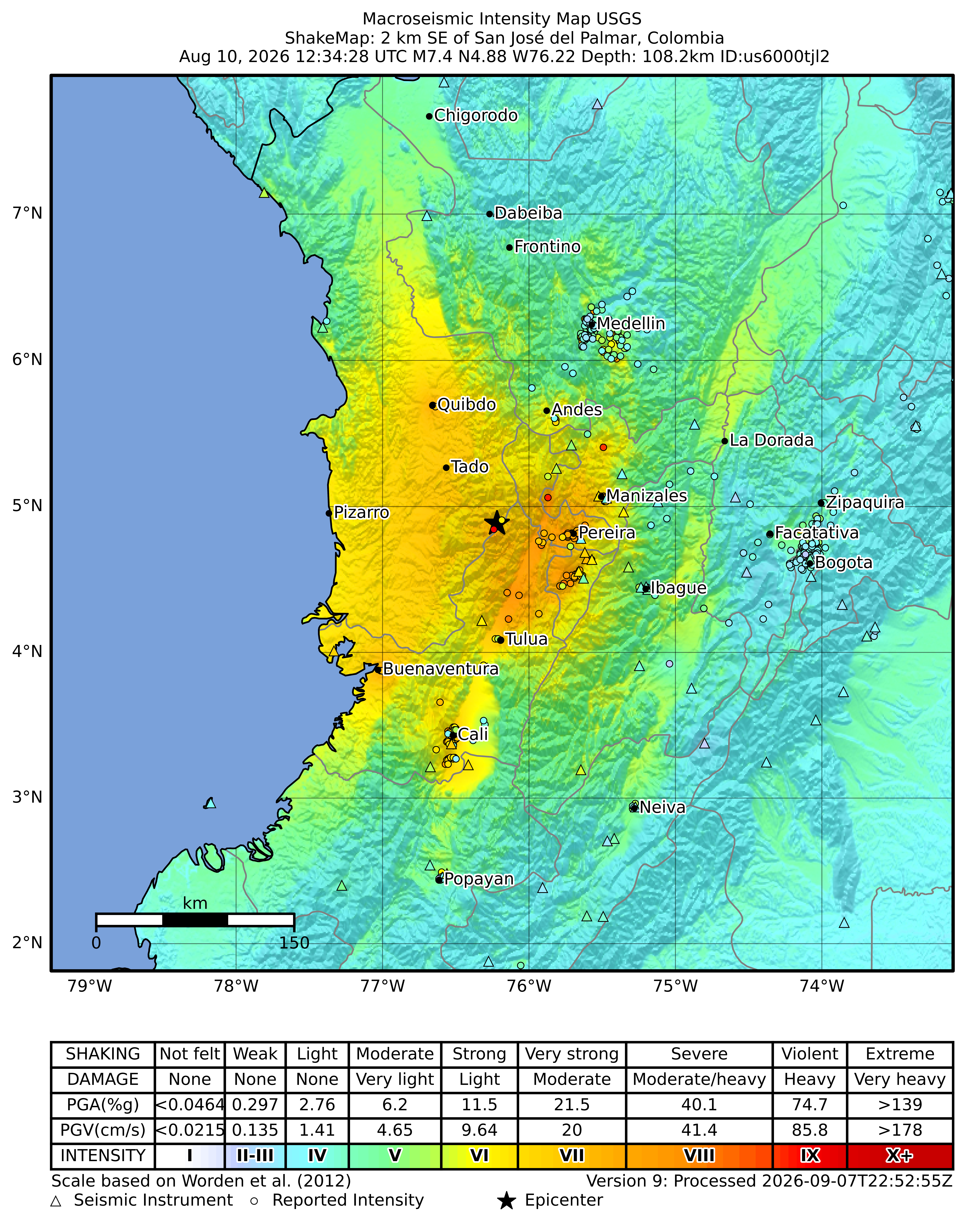
USGS ShakeMap

The earthquake measured 7.4 on the moment magnitude scale and struck at a depth of 108.2 km (67.2 mi) according to the United States Geological Survey. The Colombian Geological Survey (CGS) put the earthquake at the same magnitude and reported a depth of 96 km (60 mi). The Global Centroid Moment Tensor (GCMT) assigned the earthquake a moment magnitude of M_{w} 7.5. It had an epicenter 20 km (12 mi) from San José del Palmar in the department of Chocó and struck at 07:34 COT. It was caused by strike-slip faulting at an intermediate depth along either a northeast trending left-lateral or northwest trending right-lateral fault. The earthquake represented a rupture within the subducting Nazca plate as it subducts eastwards beneath South America along the Ecuador–Colombia trench.

The CGS said it was the strongest earthquake in the country in the last decade, and the largest since the 1979 Tumaco earthquake. It was followed by more than 100 aftershocks, the largest of which, having a magnitude of mb 5.0, struck at 08:18 COT. A peak ground acceleration of 0.426987 g in the east-west vector was recorded at a seismic observatory in Jamundí, about 202 km (126 mi) south of the epicenter or 227 km (141 mi) from the hypocenter. At Manizales, 86 km (53 mi) east of the epicenter, the east-west component of acceleration was 0.2886 g. Shaking was felt in 32 of Colombia's departmental capitals, forcing evacuations. It was estimated to have lasted for around two minutes and was also felt in Panama, Ecuador, and Venezuela.

CCTV footage of the earthquake in Pereira

The immediate epicenter area was also the epicenter area of a 108 km (67 mi) deep M_{w} 7.2 earthquake on 23 November 1979, which was caused by oblique-normal faulting. The 1979 event had a maximum Modified Mercalli intensity of VII–VIII (Very strong–Severe) assigned to a large area including the cities of Pereira, Armenia and Manizales. The shock was also felt with intensity VI (Strong) in Cali, Ibagué, Quibdó and Medellín, and V (Moderate) in Bogotá.

== Impact ==
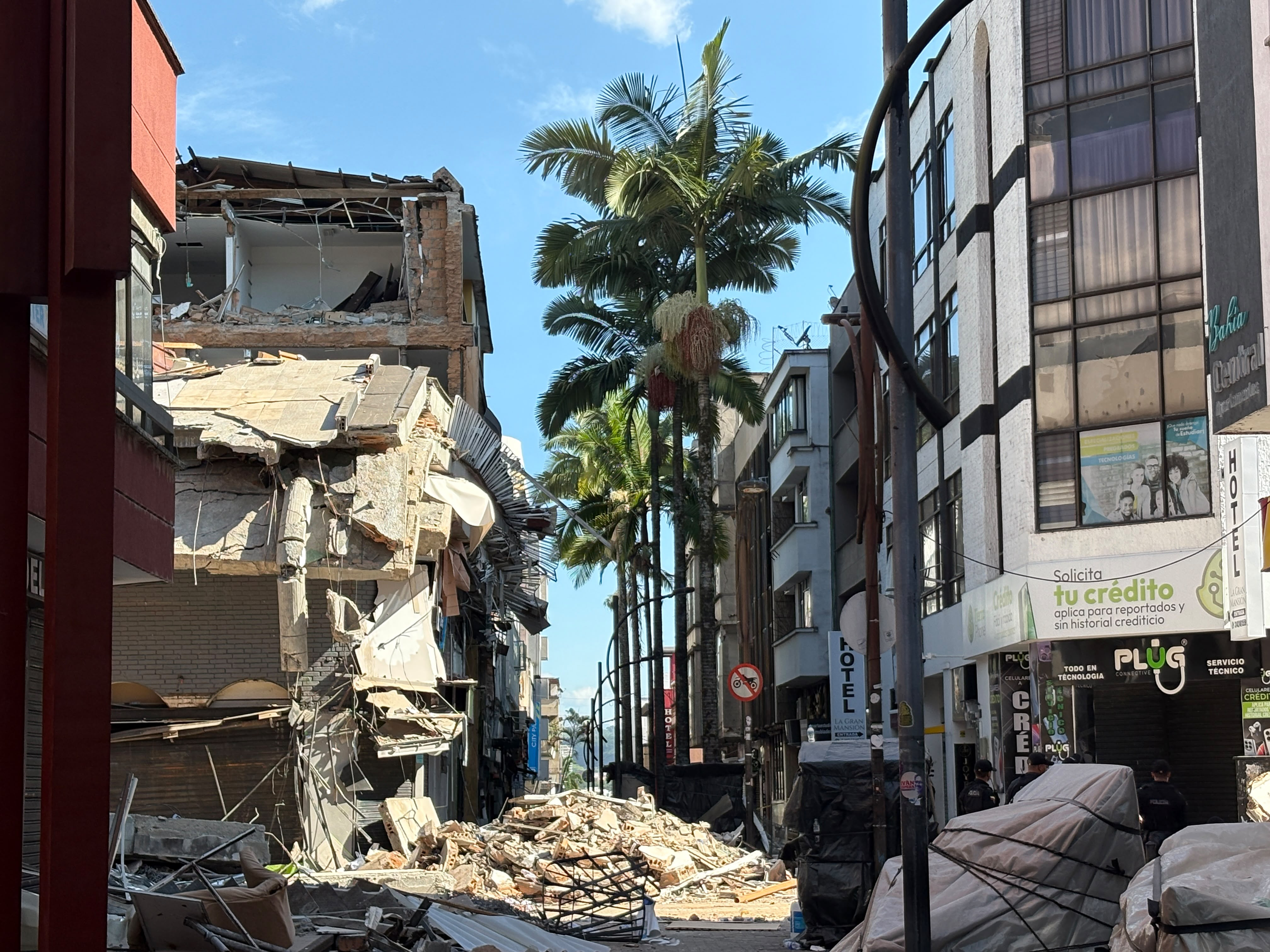
Manizales after the earthquake

Local officials reported at least 335 people died, 4,611 were injured, and 111 people remained missing. It was the deadliest earthquake in the country since 1999, when a magnitude 6.1 event affected Armenia and Pereira. There were 184 deaths in Valle del Cauca, 108 in Risaralda, 14 in Chocó, 6 in Caldas, 3 in Quindío, 2 in Cauca and 1 in Antioquia. More than 97% of the fatalities came from departmental capitals. One of the fatalities was a Chilean child. According to Spanish foreign minister José Manuel Albares, 1 Colombian–Spanish citizen died and 12 Spanish citizens were missing. Damage was reported at more than 10 airports, including in Manizales, Quibdó, Armenia, Cartago and Buenaventura. The Colombian Civil Aviation Authority said flights were suspended at these airports. More than 466,700 people were affected across the country.

Due to the intermediate depth of the earthquake, the damage was widespread and across a large area. Twelve departments were directly affected by the earthquake. The Puracé volcano in Cauca emitted fumes after the earthquake, although the CGS said it was not related to the earthquake. Across the country, at least 206,931 homes were damaged, 36,478 others were destroyed, and 743 buildings collapsed with 6,005 more damaged. Damage also occurred to 521 roads, 397 healthcare centers, 4,316 educational institutions, 120 bridges, 141 aqueducts and 6,118 community centers. The Colombian government placed initial economic damages at 30 trillion pesos (US$9.6 billion) Oxford Economics projected direct economic damages ranging from US$990 million to US$1.98 billion, equivalent to 0.2% to 0.4% of Colombia's GDP, while the USGS put the toll at near US$40 billion, or 7% of GDP. The United Nations Development Programme and the National Unit for Risk and Disaster Management (UNGRD) estimated direct physical damage at 42.1 trillion pesos (US$13.4 billion), equivalent to 2.3% of Colombia’s GDP.

Video from World Central Kitchen in Pereira, showing destruction caused by the earthquake

Six people were killed in Caldas Department. In Palestina, one person was injured by a collapsed wall, eight homes collapsed and 100 others were damaged. Four schools, four churches, two hospitals, a police station, a sports center, the House of Culture and two cemeteries were also affected. Five people died, 36 structures collapsed and several churches were damaged in Manizales. One of the towers of the Cathedral Basilica of Our Lady of the Rosary collapsed into the nave. A four-story building partially collapsed in the city. In Armenia, three deaths occurred, 174 people were injured, five buildings collapsed, and 240 homes and 40 buildings were damaged, including the control tower and the runway of El Edén International Airport. Across Quindío Department, 334 people were injured, and more than 10,000 homes were damaged or destroyed. At least 107 people were killed in Pereira, including three at Matecaña International Airport, which partially collapsed. In the city, at least 65 buildings collapsed, including 15 in which people were trapped in the immediate aftermath. Some people were also trapped inside the city's cable cars.

In the department of Chocó, where the epicenter was located, at least 14 deaths and 119 injuries were recorded. Twelve people were killed, 36 were injured and 42 structures collapsed in Quibdó. Nubia Carolina Córdoba, the governor of Chocó, said several municipalities were severely impacted, while preliminary reports described damages in Quibdó as well as the Alto and Bajo Baudó regions as "monstrous." In the epicentral town, San José del Palmar, 42 houses collapsed and 580 others were damaged. Road infrastructures leading to the town were heavily damaged or buried under landslides, and telecommunication services were disabled. Several people were killed and 70 were injured in Istmina. Its mayor, Jaison Mosquera Sánchez, said the earthquake damaged more than 550 homes and affected 3,000 people. Sánchez also said that all school buildings and the city hall were affected. In Sipí, a local leader also said only four or five of the town's 65 homes remained intact.

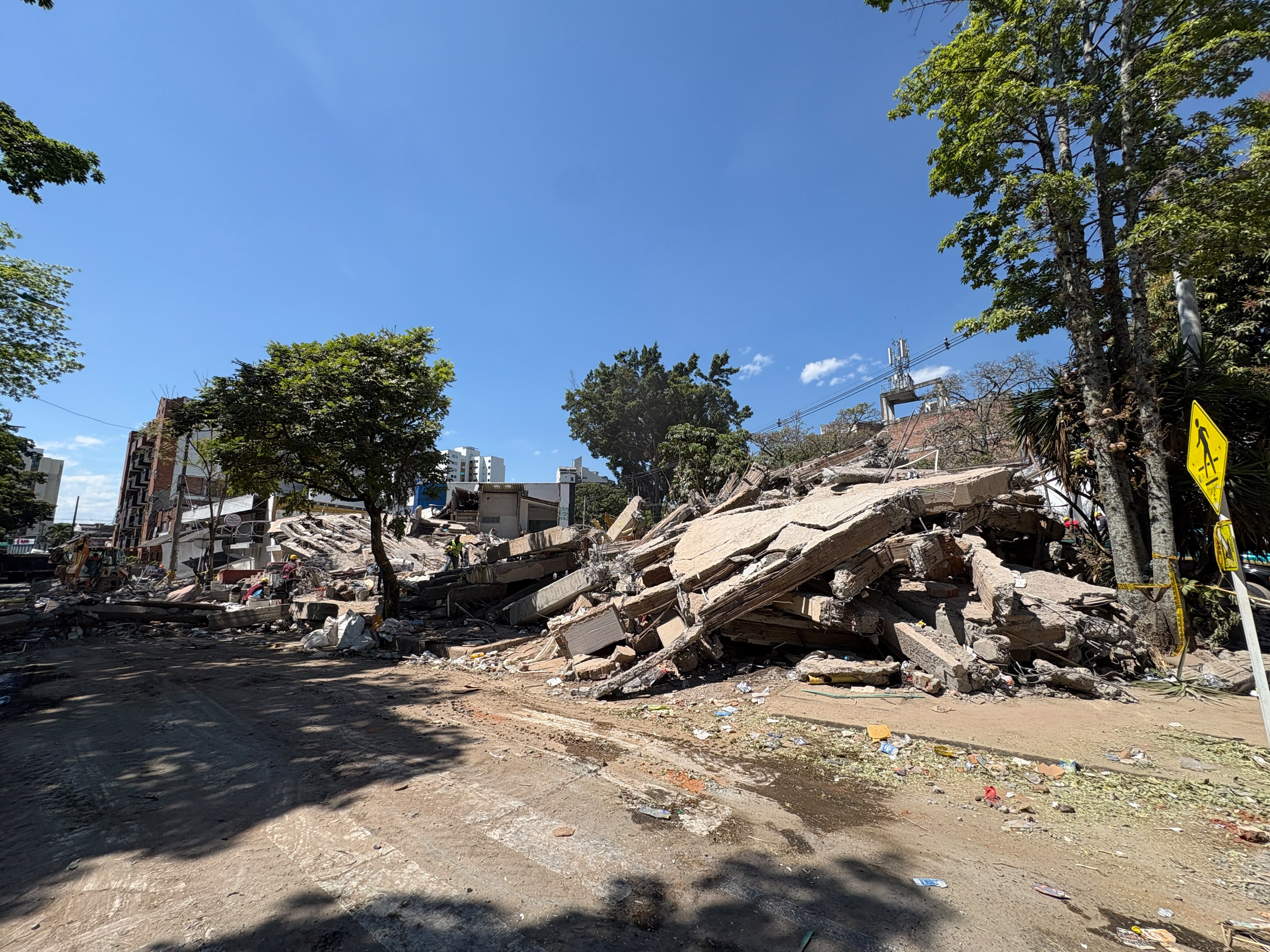
An apartment building destroyed in Cali

In Valle del Cauca Department, at least 184 people died, and about 5,000 homes were destroyed. About 80% of homes were reportedly destroyed in El Cairo. Severe infrastructural damage was also recorded in the towns of Riofrío and Vijes. In Cali, 153 people died and 1,500 were injured. More than 5,000 buildings were damaged or destroyed in the city, 40 of which collapsed. Eighteen hospitals were also damaged. Several buildings in El Lido, Alameda, Tequendama, Nueva Tequendama, Cámbulos, Cuarto de Legua, El Refugio, Pampalinda, El Limonar, Capri, and Caldas neighborhoods experienced a complete collapse. Heavy damage was also reported at the nearby University Hospital of Valle. Due to a section of the hospital's upper floors collapsing, more than 600 patients at that hospital were evacuated and treated in the open. The Estadio Olímpico Pascual Guerrero was also damaged. Along the Cali-Buenaventura highway, 15 vehicles were stranded inside a tunnel after rockslides blocked the exit leading to Cali. Nine people also died in Buenaventura. In Calima, four children were killed while 30 others were injured after the Gimnasio Calima school partially collapsed. The basilica of Our Lord of the Miracles of Buga sustained cracks across its central dome.

The earthquake was felt strongly in Bogotá, where people evacuated from buildings. Mayor Carlos Fernando Galán said some buildings were cracked but there were no reports of severe damage. More than 464 reports of cracks and fissures and other damage to buildings were received in the city. In the department of Cundinamarca, there were two reports of building damage, including structural damage to a school in Nilo. In Antioquia, one person was killed by a rockfall in Támesis. More than 350 homes, 61 schools, 29 churches and 7 hospitals were damaged in the department. Caved-in roofs and fractured walls were reported in towns on the outskirts of Medellín. The interior of the Basilica of the Immaculate Conception in Jardín was damaged, while several religious images were destroyed.

Evacuations were also ordered in several buildings across Panama following the shaking. Panama City's rapid transit Panama Metro temporarily suspended service on Lines 1 and 2. It returned to normal operations after structural inspections confirmed no risks. Slight structural damage was observed in a health center in Montijo and at several buildings in Panama Oeste Province. The Fire Department attended to two people who suffered anxiety attacks in Chitré. In Ecuador, six homes were damaged in Carchi and Esmeraldas provinces and masonry fell from a building in Guayas Province.

Statistics per municipality
Department	Municipality	Reported Deaths
Valle del Cauca	Cali	165
Risaralda	Pereira	109
Chocó	Quibdó	12
Valle del Cauca	Buenaventura	11
Valle del Cauca	Buga	6
Valle del Cauca	Roldanillo	6
Caldas	Manizales	5
Valle del Cauca	Cartago	4
Quindío	Armenia	3
Valle del Cauca	Sevilla	3
Valle del Cauca	Tuluá	3
Antioquia	Támesis	1
Cauca	Popayán	1
Cauca	Santander de Quilichao	1
Risaralda	Belén de Umbría	1
Source: Identified victims report from the National Institute of Legal Medicine and Forensic Sciences, Updated on August 26, 2026 at 12:10 P.M.

== Response ==
=== Domestic ===
President Abelardo de la Espriella declared a state of national disaster and declared three days of national mourning. He arrived in Bogotá and was at the UNGRD headquarters to meet with the mayors and governors of the affected areas. He said he was activating rescue and disaster relief teams in the affected areas. He ordered the establishment of a Unified Command Post to coordinate the disaster response. De la Espriella then traveled to Quibdó and Cali on the evening of 10 August to survey the damage. He also declared a economic emergency on 12 August and proposed the creation of a "Miracle Fund" that would channel national and international contributions to be allocated for the rebuilding of infrastructure. Finance minister Miguel Gómez Martínez announced that the government would activate a loan with the World Bank costing up to US$450 million as part of efforts to guarantee the availability of resources. He also issued a one-month extension for the payment of income tax, whose deadline was originally scheduled on 13 August. On 15 August, de la Espriella, through a phone call, asked US president Donald Trump to suspend tariffs on Colombian exports to help businesses and accelerate economic recovery of in earthquake-affected areas.

Rescue work was conducted by soldiers, rescue personnel, and relatives of those trapped. Volunteers formed lines to help pass large pieces of concrete as rescuers sorted through the rubble. In Cali, rescue efforts began immediately at dozens of building collapse sites to rescue those trapped. At least 38 people were rescued from the rubble, but mayor Alejandro Eder appealed for more rescuers. To support the response, Bogotá's mayor Carlos Fernando Galán initially dispatched 100 rescuers to Cali. Five units of the army with rescue capabilities and equipment were also dispatched. By 11 August, there were more than 220 rescue specialists and 100 military engineers in the city. A trapped survivor underwent emergency amputation onsite to remove her right leg, which had been pinned down under a concrete column. She was rescued from the rubble after 10 hours. Protests were held at Cali's city hall by residents criticizing the absence of authorities in affected areas. The city government said that it would take up to three years to rebuild following the earthquake, with a cost of at least US$3.2 billion. In Pereira, mayor Mauricio Salazar Peláez advised residents not to visit the Los Nevados Clinic, San Jorge Hospital, and Comfamiliar Clinic because they were overwhelmed by the number of injured arriving. The Noé Clinic was partially evacuated due to damage. Rescue operations ordered extended beyond the 72 hour-window for retrieving survivors following the earthquake until 15 August. A court in Barranquilla subsequently ordered the suspension of demolitions of damaged structures in Pereira where there is a possibility that people could still be alive underneath.

In Medellín, more than 260 firefighters and 40 engineers conducted building damage inspections. Several injured patients were airlifted from Quibdó to Medellín. At the University Hospital of Valle in Cali, where 70% of its infrastructure was damaged, there were no outpatient or surgical services. The director said 800 patients were evacuated and 6 died.

In many instances, neighbours and relatives of those trapped were the first to respond to the emergency. More than 500 people, including specialists and volunteers, searched for survivors within the rubble without equipment in Pereira. Areas like the impoverished Chocó Department experienced equipment shortages. Cristian Torres, the regional director of the Red Cross in the Americas, said it made an emergency appeal to support the region for 24 months, citing a long-term operation expected due to the widespread impact. The Colombian Red Cross dispatched its search and rescue teams to the departments of Antioquia, Quindío and Caldas. Thirty personnel were deployed to Chocó. The United Nations Office for the Coordination of Humanitarian Affairs said Colombian authorities did not appeal for assistance, but the organisation was preparing for that possibility. In Bogotá, the Red Cross and Bogotá Food Bank collected donations and set up collection centers for supplies. While there were abundant food donations, essential goods such as mattresses, blankets, and electrical generators were lacking. On 17 August, the country's forensic sciences department had identified 288 of the 298 bodies received.

Curfews were enforced in Cali and Pereira to prevent theft and allow rescue work to continue smoothly. Exemptions were issued for those who were participating in the rescue and relief efforts. President de la Espriella also announced more than 1,000 soldiers would be active in Cali to enforce public order after there were reports of unrest and looting. Parks and streets in the city became refuge spaces for people who were displaced. The 30th edition of the Petronio Alvarez Pacific Music Festival, which was due to be held in Cali from 12 to 17 August, was suspended by mayor Eder. The División Mayor del Fútbol Profesional Colombiano (DIMAYOR) suspended all activity in its competitions for the week, while CONMEBOL temporarily suspended the Copa Libertadores and Copa Sudamericana matches involving Colombian clubs. President de la Espriella said families of those affected would receive rental subsidies and their utility bills and tax filings would be suspended to cope with the losses. A car-free day was also declared in Pereira to allow search operations to proceed. The city's harvest festival was also cancelled, with funds originally meant to be used in the event diverted instead to disaster recovery. The 2026 edition of the Vuelta a Colombia was terminated three days before its scheduled conclusion in Medellin on 16 August, after five stages and 880 km (550 mi). Frontrunner Diego Camargo of Team Medellín EPM was declared the winner.

A benefit concert for victims of the earthquake, titled "Colombia, Medellín te quiere" was announced for 15 August at the La Macarena Events Center in Medellín, featuring more than 25 artists including Pipe Bueno, Kapo, Juliana Velásquez, Andy Rivera, Jhonny Rivera, Llane, Westcol, and Pelicanger. Morat also declared announced that it will donate proceeds from its six concerts from its "Ya es mañana" tour at the Movistar Arena in Bogotá. Another benefit concert, titled "Colombia: Voces por la Vida" was held on 23 August at the Vive Claro in Bogotá, featuring performances by Andrés Cepeda, Beéle, Bonka, ChocQuibTown, Draco Rosa, Eladio Carrión, Galy Galiano, Grupo Niche, Juliana Velásquez, Manuel Medrano, Miguel Bosé, Pedro Capo, Sebastián Yatra, Silvestre Dangond, and Karol G. The concert raised 11.2 billion pesos (US$3.5 million). Jhon Arias, a native of Quibdó, and his wife arranged an aircraft to transport medical personnel and supplies to the city. Shakira raised $1 million to fund the reconstruction of affected educational facilities. On 17 August, she visited Quibdó with American philanthropist Howard Buffett and announced the construction of ten schools and the reconstruction of the University of Chocó. Jhonny Rivera also opened his farm in Risaralda to shelter displaced elderly persons.

The National Association of Entrepreneurs of Colombia (ANDI) raised more than US$64 million for emergency assistance and reconstruction efforts. The Santo Domingo family pledged 100 billion pesos (US$32 million), while the Gilinski family pledged 150 billion pesos (US$48 million) to be used mainly for reconstruction efforts in Colombia. Monetary donations were also given by several other individuals and entities in the business sector such as Arturo Calle, Tecnoglass, Ecopetrol, Bancolombia and Grupo Éxito. Acerias Paz del Rio and Cemex provided construction equipment, while Alpina Productos Alimenticios, Tetra Pak, Bavaria Brewery and Postobón pledged milk, water and other vital beverages.

=== International ===
Ecuadorian president Daniel Noboa offered the Colombian government the assistance of a 47-member search and rescue team that can independently operate in Colombia for seven days. Noboa additionally expressed support to the Colombian people and conveyed sympathies for the families affected by the earthquake. Foreign Minister of Venezuela Félix Plasencia also stated that Venezuela is ready to send rescue workers and humanitarian aid. US Secretary of State Marco Rubio and several US Congress members expressed solidarity with Colombia and stated that the United States is ready to assist in rescue efforts. Similar statements were made by Mexican president Claudia Sheinbaum and Salvadoran president Nayib Bukele. Israeli foreign minister Gideon Sa'ar and Chilean president José Antonio Kast also stated that their countries were willing to provide aid to Colombia. On 13 August, Israel sent an aid delegation to Colombia, while Chile sent humanitarian aid consisting of a 10-ton shipment that included food, personal hygiene items, and medicines. Argentine president Javier Milei and foreign minister Pablo Quirno expressed condolences and support to the Colombian people as well as Argentina's willingness to provide any assistance required by Colombia.

Bolivia's president Rodrigo Paz offered condolences to Colombians and stated that Bolivia was willing to provide assistance within the scope of its capacities and if requested by the Colombian government. President of Panama José Raúl Mulino expressed condolences and said that Panama would send aid to Colombia, stating that logistics were underway to deliver assistance. Guatemalan president Bernardo Arévalo and the government of Costa Rica also announced that they were ready to help. Swiss president Guy Parmelin also offered assistance to Colombia.

Condolences were extended to Colombia by King Charles III of the United Kingdom and other Commonwealth realms, President Luiz Inácio Lula da Silva of Brazil, President Emmanuel Macron of France, Prime Minister Giorgia Meloni of Italy, King Carl XVI Gustaf of Sweden, President Volodymyr Zelenskyy of Ukraine, Prime Minister Pedro Sánchez of Spain, King Harald V of Norway, President Keiko Fujimori of Peru, President Yamandú Orsi of Uruguay, President Nasry Asfura of Honduras, paramount leader Xi Jinping of China, Prime Minister Anwar Ibrahim of Malaysia, King Mohammed VI of Morocco, Prime Minister Shehbaz Sharif of Pakistan, President Bongbong Marcos of the Philippines, President Patrick Herminie of Seychelles, President Tô Lâm of Vietnam and the Thai government. (Note: Attributed to multiple sources:)

The United States announced that they would supply Colombia with US$26.5 million of relief, while president de la Espriella announced that the United Arab Emirates would donate US$10 million to Colombia. A search team from Los Angeles County Fire Department subsequently arrived in Colombia, while another urban search-and-rescue team from Fairfax County, Virginia, was mobilised at the request of the Colombian government. President of the European Commission Ursula von der Leyen announced that the Commission had mobilized the Copernicus Programme in order to aid with rescue operations in Colombia. The European Union allocated €2 million in humanitarian aid for Colombia. Switzerland has pledged SFr 1 million in emergency aid to Colombia. El Salvador announced that they would send two planes with 100 tons of humanitarian relief; President Bukele also claimed that Colombia had rejected international offers of supplying rescue teams and had only requested financial aid for affected Colombian families. Previously, Chinese ambassador to Bogotá Zhu Jingyang tweeted that the Chinese government was struggling to coordinate assistance for the earthquake with the Colombian government. Mexico redeployed members of the Topos de Tlatelolco who were assisting in rescue operations in Caracas following the 2026 Venezuela earthquakes in June to Cali. The Vatican sent at least €100,000 in aid through the Episcopal Conference of Colombia, while the World Bank released $200 million in emergency financing.

Despite the offers of rescue teams from Mexico, their state leaders said they were not given permission to be in Colombia, which was criticized by its citizens. However, de la Espriella's government accepted humanitarian supplies, medical equipment, and other goods from Mexico which they requested. Mexico's president, Claudia Sheinbaum, said they planned to send another 58 tonnes (57 long tons; 64 short tons) of aid by 14 August. The only nations from which Colombia formally requested search and rescue teams were El Salvador, Ecuador, Israel and the United States. According to UNGRD head David Santiago Tamayo, these countries met their international requirements for the task. The mayor of Cali also said that they wanted to "maximize its rescue capabilities before requesting international support." Sheinbaum disputed the explanation by saying the Mexican rescue teams were already certified but Colombian authorities requested another, adding that the team has been dispatched in 98 countries. Politically conservative de la Espriella faced accusations of preventing rescue teams with left-wing leaders from entering Colombia, which Colombian foreign minister Omar Bula denied. The Colombian government said it had initially established that foreign assistance should focus on logistics and material resources, while rescue operations should be handled by domestic actors. On 12 August, vice president José Manuel Restrepo announced that more than 12 countries including Sweden, Turkey, the United States, Mexico, El Salvador, Ecuador, Japan, Brazil, Switzerland, and Sweden pledged to deploy humanitarian aid and rescue teams. On August 13, a leaked letter revealed that Javier Pava, the then head of the UNGRD and a holdover from the government of de la Espriella's immediate predecessor, Gustavo Petro, had rejected the international aid, as he was still in post due to the lack of transfer of power, as de la Espriella ended the process due to Petro's refusal to accept the results of the 2026 election. Pava was removed from his post a day later and could face a criminal investigation. He was replaced by David Santiago Tamayo.

Starlink announced that it would provide free internet service to customers in Chocó, Caldas, Valle del Cauca, Risaralda, and Quindío departments until 12 September. FC Barcelona raised at least €100,000 (approximately US$115,000) in donations and launched another fundraising campaign to help affected communities. Chef José Andrés announced that he would donate US$1 million to small food businesses affected by the earthquake. In a joint video appearance, Lamine Yamal and Ryan Castro announced that they were sending aircraft carrying humanitarian aid to Chocó and Cali. In another joint announcement, Nicky Jam and Grupo Argos donated COP 13 billion (US$4.2 million) in aid. Beyonce also donated US$1 million through Food For The Poor and World Central Kitchen. HYBE also pledged US$300,000 in aid. In Miami, a benefit concert titled "United for Our Own" aimed at helping victims of the Venezuela and Colombia earthquakes was announced for 16 August at the Kaseya Center, featuring performances by more than 15 artists including Marc Anthony, Ricardo Montaner, Feid, Silvestre Dangond, Piso 21, Jay Wheeler, Elena Rose, Gente de Zona, Mau y Ricky, Olga Tañón, and Lasso. Netflix donated US$186,000 (600 million pesos) towards affected workers in the film and television industry.

== See also ==
- List of earthquakes in 2026
- List of earthquakes in Colombia
- 1906 Ecuador–Colombia earthquake – Offshore earthquake west of Ecuador and Colombia in January 1906
- 1999 Colombia earthquake – 6.2-magnitude earthquake in Colombia
- 2026 Panama earthquake
