= Basilica of the Immaculate Conception (Jardín) =

Coordinates: 5.5990°N 75.8188°W

- Basílica de la Inmaculada Concepción
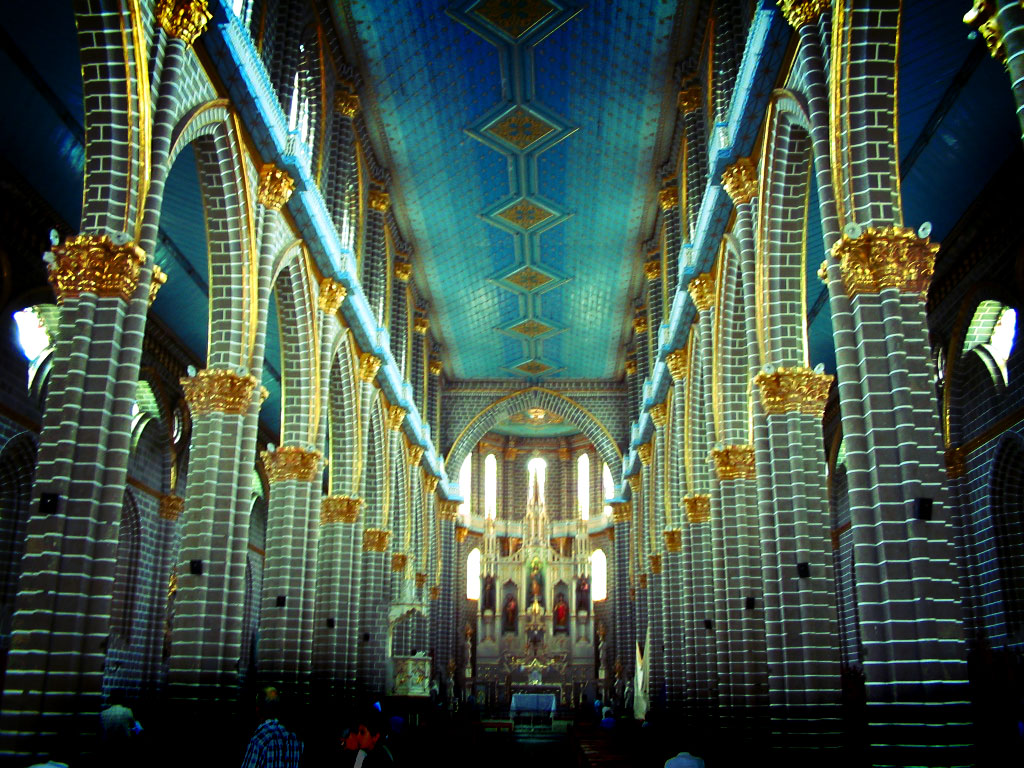
- Basilica of the Immaculate Conception
- Country: Colombia
- Denomination: Catholic

History
- Status: Minor basilica
- Founded: 1872

Architecture
- Functional status: Active
- Style: Neo-Gothic

The Minor Basilica of the Immaculate Conception is a Colombian Catholic basilica located in Jardín, Antioquia, within the Roman Catholic Diocese of Jericó. It is a Neo-Gothic temple that lacks a rib vault and occupies an area of 1.680 m^{2}, built entirely from hand carved stone quarried in the foothills of the town.

== History ==
The basilica was first erected as a vice parish in 1872 and was started by Father San Juan Nepomuceno Barrera. He allegedly asked that sinners bring stones from the nearby quarry equal in weight to the weight of their sins for its construction. It became a parish in 1881, but the construction of the present church did not begin until March 20, 1918. It was completed in 1940 with José Angel Botero as the director. It would be the same Botero who modified the original plans, drawn by Giovanni Buscaglione, a Salesian architect and priest from Piedmont. While the building was still under construction, it was opened in 1932, still lacking the towers and part of the facade.

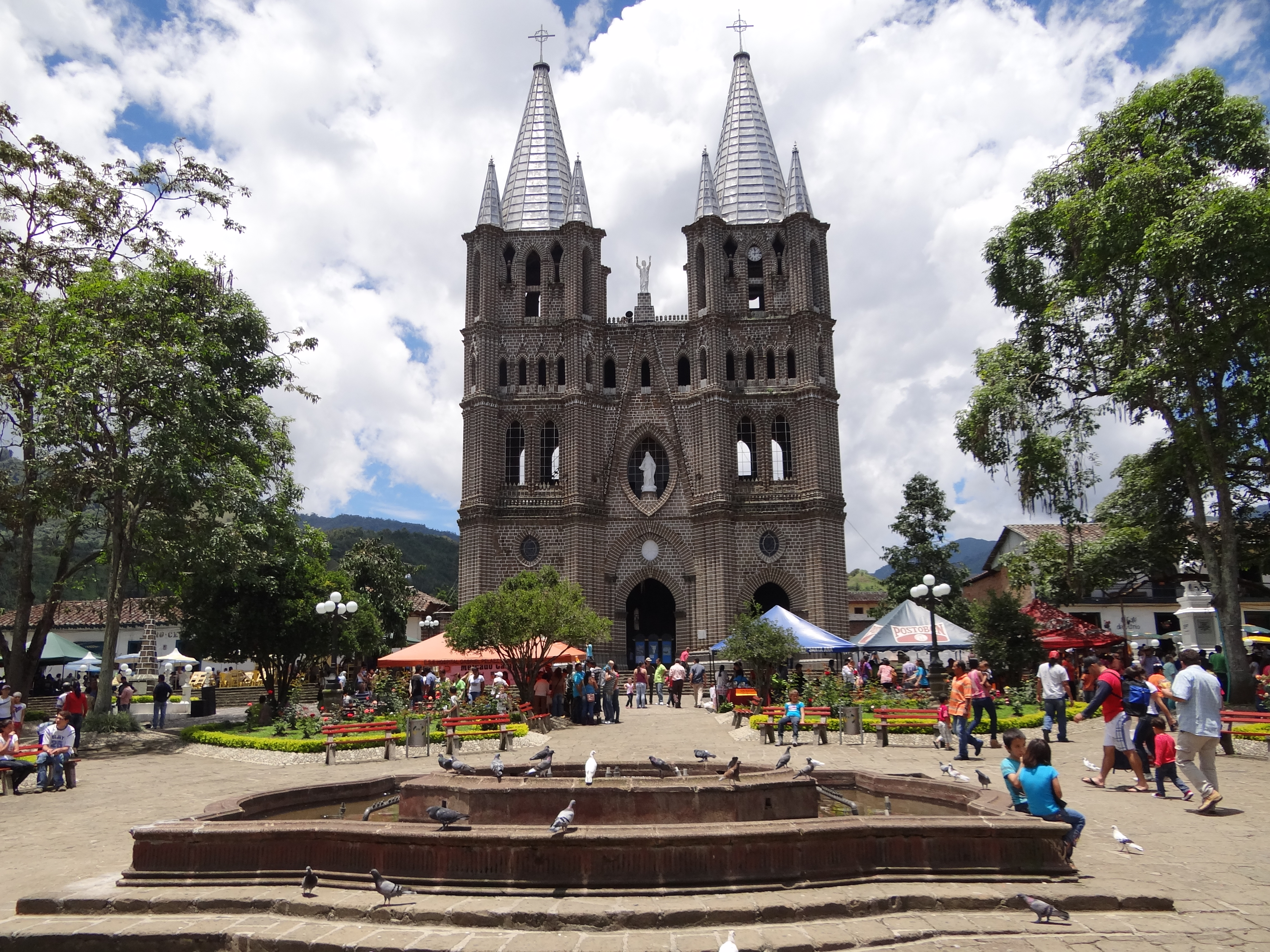
Exterior view of the basilica.

In 1979, the city experienced an earthquake that affected not only the church but also El Libertador park nearby, located in front of the temple. The park had to be rebuilt almost completely, also, in the case of the church, it was necessary to repair several doors and build two emergency exits; reforms that were exploited to improve the sound amplification system.

On June 3, 2003, the church was elevated to the rank of minor basilica, becoming the twenty-fourth Colombian church in obtaining such a title.

The church's interior sustained heavy damage following the 2026 Colombia earthquake on August 10, while several religious images inside were destroyed.

== Architecture ==
The basilica has 128 windows and skylights and two Hamburger bells. The statue of San Juan Bautista, the holy water font, the tabernacle, and the pulpit are made out of Carrara marble. Its interior is painted turquoise. Its two towers and crosses are made of aluminum.
