= Libardo Ramírez Gómez =

Colombian Roman Catholic prelate (1933–2025)

His Excellency Libardo Ramírez Gómez
- Bishop Emeritus of Armenia
- Archdiocese: Manizales
- Diocese: Armenia
- Appointed: 8 February 1972
- Term ended: 15 March 2003
- Predecessor: José de Jesús Martinez Vargas
- Successor: José Roberto López Londoño

Orders
- Ordination: 26 May 1956
- Consecration: 8 April 1972 by Angelo Palmas, Jacinto Vásquez Ochoa, Félix María Torres Parra

Personal details
- Born: 12 November 1933 Garzón, Huila, Colombia
- Died: 11 September 2025 (aged 91) Bogotá, Colombia

Libardo Ramírez Gómez (12 November 1933 – 11 September 2025) was a Colombian Roman Catholic prelate.

== Biography ==
Ramírez Gómez was ordained a priest on 26 May 1956. Pope Paul VI appointed him bishop of Armenia on 8 February 1972. The Apostolic Nuncio to Colombia, Angelo Palmas, consecrated him bishop on 8 April of the same year; His co-consecrators were Félix María Torres Parra, Bishop of Sincelejo, and Jacinto Vásquez Ochoa, Bishop of Espinal.

Pope John Paul II appointed him bishop of Garzón on 18 October 1986. He resigned from his office on 15 March 2003.

Ramírez Gómez died on 11 September 2025, at the age of 91.

Catholic Church titles
Preceded by José de Jesús Martinez Vargas	Bishop of Armenia; 1972–2003	Succeeded by José Roberto López Londoño
