= Diocese of Jericó =

Latin Catholic ecclesiastical territory in Colombia

Coordinates: 5.7912°N 75.7866°W

Diocese of Jericó Dioecesis Iericoënsis

Catholic
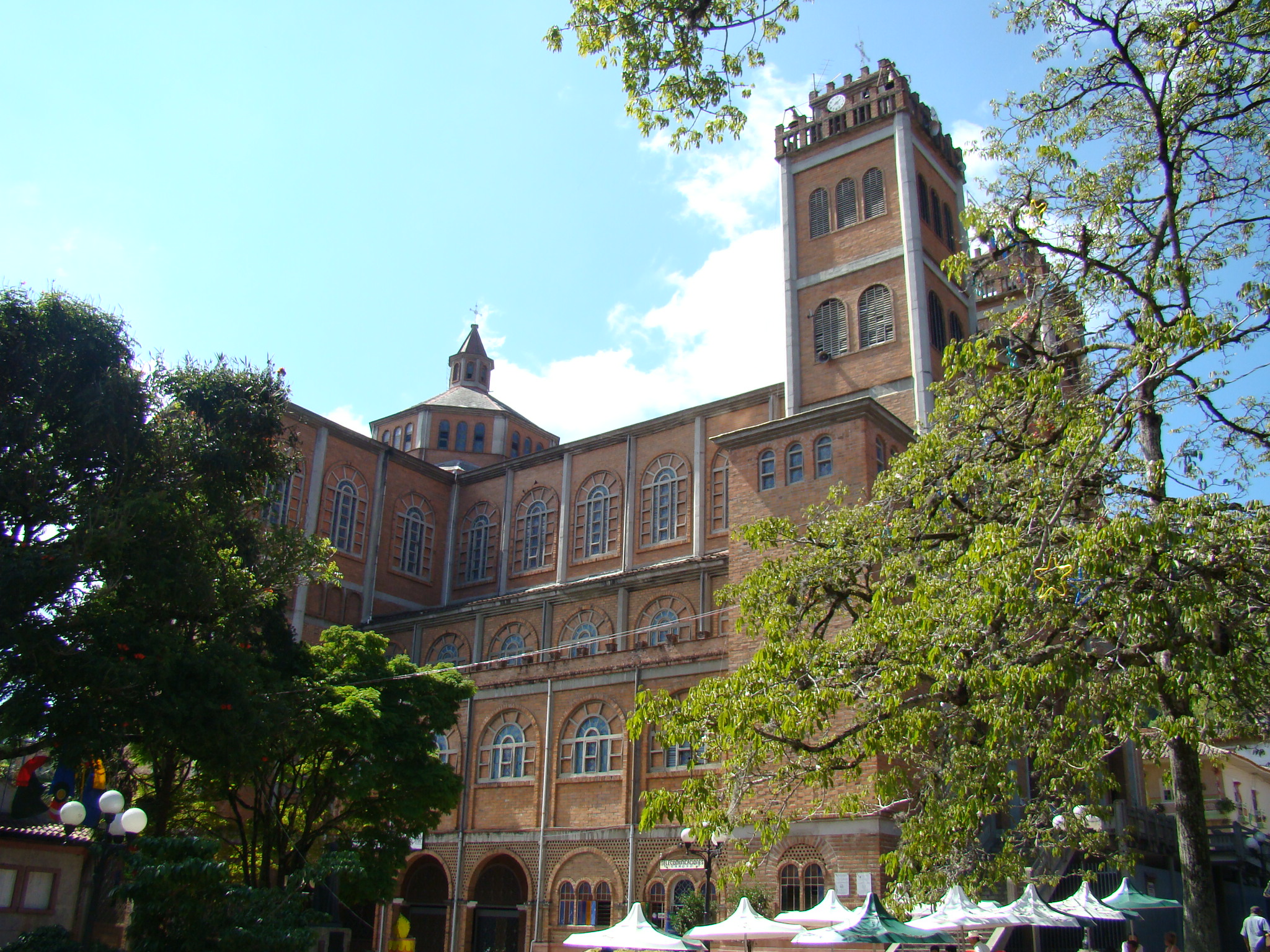
- Cathedral of Our Lady of Mercy

- Coat of arms

Location
- Country: Colombia
- Ecclesiastical province: Medellín

Statistics
- Area: 3,000 km^{2} (1,200 sq mi)
- Population: Total; Catholics: (as of 2004); 230000; 228000 (99.1%)

Information
- Denomination: Catholic Church
- Sui iuris church: Latin Church
- Rite: Roman Rite
- Established: 3 July 1941 (85 years ago)
- Cathedral: Catedral de Nuestra Señora de las Mercedes

Current leadership
- Pope: Leo XIV
- Bishop: Diego Luis Rendón Urrea
- Bishops emeritus: Noel Londoño Antonio Buitrago, CSsR

Map

Website
- https://www.facebook.com/diocesisdejerico/?locale=es_LA

The Diocese of Jericó (Latin: Dioecesis Iericoënsis) is a Latin Church ecclesiastical territory or diocese of the Catholic Church in Western Colombia. It is a suffragan diocese in the ecclesiastical province of the metropolitan Archdiocese of Medellín.

== History ==
- 29 January 1915: Established as Diocese of Jericó, on territory split off from the Metropolitan Archdiocese of Medellin
- 5 February 1917: Suppressed, its territory and title being merged into the then Diocese of Antioquia-Jericó (now Archdiocese of Santa Fe de Antioquia)
- 3 July 1941: Restored as Diocese of Jericó, regaining its territory from the above Diocese of Antioquía–Jericó.

== Statistics ==
As of 2015, it pastorally served 262,951 Catholics (98.1% of 268,000 total population) on 3,000 km^{2} in 33 parishes and 35 missions with 76 priests (diocesan), 2 deacons, 106 lay religious (106 sisters) and 25 seminarians.

== Special churches ==
- Its cathedral is the Catedral de Nuestra Señora de las Mercedes, dedicated to Our Lady of Mercy, in the episcopal see of Jericó, in the Colombian department of Antioquia
- It further has a Minor Basilica (also Marian) : Basilica of the Immaculate Conception, at Jardín

== Bishops ==
Suffragan Bishops of Jericó

- Maximiliano Crespo Rivera (1915 – 7 February 1917), Apostolic Administrator, Bishop of Antioquía
- Antonio José Jaramillo Tobón (7 February 1942 – retired 31 March 1960)
- Augusto Trujillo Arango (31 March 1960 – 20 February 1970)
- Juan Eliseo Mojica Oliveros (4 June 1970 – 26 April 1977)
- Augusto Aristizábal Ospina (29 October 1977 – retired 7 October 2003)
- José Roberto López Londoño (7 October 2003 – 13 June 2013)
- Noel Antonio Londoño Buitrago, C.SS.R. (10 August 2013 – 13 July 2026)
- Diego Luis Rendón Urrea (since 13 July 2026)

Other priests of this diocese who became bishop

- José Luis Henao Cadavid, appointed Bishop of Líbano-Honda in 2015

== See also ==
- List of Catholic dioceses in Colombia
- Roman Catholicism in Colombia

== Sources and External links ==
- GCatholic.org, with Google map & satellite HQ picture - data for all sections
- Catholic Hierarchy
