= Noel Antonio Londoño Buitrago =

The Most Reverend Noel Antonio Londoño Buitrago C.Ss.R.
- Bishop of Jericó
- Church: Catholic Church
- Diocese: Jericó
- Appointed: 13 June 2013
- Installed: 24 August 2013
- Term ended: 13 July 2026
- Predecessor: José Roberto López Londoño
- Successor: Diego Luis Rendón Urrea

Orders
- Ordination: 23 November 1973
- Consecration: 10 August 2013 by Julio Terrazas Sandoval

Personal details
- Born: Noel Antonio Londoño Buitrago; 6 August 1949 (age 77) Quimbaya, Colombia
- Education: Pontifical Gregorian University
- Motto: Nos amó y se entregó por nosotros
- Coat of arms

Noel Antonio Londoño Buitrago C.Ss.R. (commonly Noel Londoño; born 6 August 1949) is a Colombian Roman Catholic prelate who has served as Bishop of Jericó since 2013 until his retirement in 2026. He is a member of the Redemptorists.

== Biography ==
Noel Antonio Londoño Buitrago was born in Quimbaya on 6 August 1949, the year his parents moved there from Filandia. Other priests in his family include three brothers and two nephews. He attended Santander primary school there and high school at the El Pilar schools in Popayán and at the San Clemente Hofbauer in Manizales. He completed his studies in philosophy at the Redemptorist seminary in the Suba neighborhood of Bogota and in theology at the Major Seminary of Bogotá.

He took his first vows on 22 December 1966 and his final vows as a Redemptorist on 27 January 1973. He was ordained a priest on 23 November 1973. From 1981 to 1985 he studied at the Pontifical Gregorian University in Rome, earning his licentiate and doctorate in dogmatic theology with a dissertation on the theology of the Passion of Christ in the works of St. Alphonsus Liguori.

He was professor of dogmatic theology in Bogota at the Franciscan University of San Buenaventura and the Jesuit Pontifical Xaverian University. He was professor and rector of the Redemptorist Major Seminary in Bogotá from 1985 to 1991. He was appointed twice, in 1991 and 1997, to six-year terms as councilor of the Redemptorists, based in Rome. Following a sabbatical year he was rector of the Basilica del Señor de los Milagros in Buga from 2005 to 2010, while also serving as president of the Federation of Sanctuaries of Colombia and a member of the team for sanctuaries and popular religiosity of the Episcopal Conference of Latin America (CELAM). He was then briefly parish priest of San Gerardo Mayela in Bogotá. From 2011 to 2013 he was coordinator of the newly created Redemptorist Conference of Latin America and the Caribbean.

Pope Francis appointed him bishop of Jericó on 13 June 2013. He received his episcopal consecration on 10 August 2013 from another Redemptorist, Cardinal Julio Terrazas Sandoval, in the Buga basilica. He was installed in Jericó on 24 August.

He has long opposed the efforts of the South African multinational AngloGold Ashanti, with support from the national government, to develop its Quebradona copper mining operations in Jericó. He has condemned the company's human rights record and ties to genocide in the Congo as well as history of environmental abuse in Ghana. He has charged government agencies with corruption in promoting mining enterprises, though he says he does not oppose mining in general. He succeeded in having the project shelved in 2021. He has explained his opposition based on experiences throughout his career, in Putumayo and Chocó, for examples, seeing corporate abuse of the environment and exploitation of the miners and the local population. He has also taught his priests and seminarians the principals of ecology and theology, and he plans to share his education program with Church leaders internationally.

On 10 January 2018, he was named commissioner for Sodalitium Christianae Vitae, a Catholic society of apostolic life, as it undertook reforms following an investigation of its leadership and management, including sexual abuse by its founder.

In 2021, he defended the Church's procedures for handling accusations of sexual abuse on the part of a priest, requiring suspension while charges are investigated. He warned of far greater problems in other public institutions and within families.

In September 2023 he said he planned to submit his resignation in December of that year, more than six months before required, though he would continue his Redemptorist missionary work after leaving Jericó because "there is a lot of work still to be done in the world". He announced in June 2024 that he had submitted his resignation in advance of his 75th birthday, when it was due, and Pope Francis had agreed to allow him retire when he turned 75, but to continue to administer the diocese until the appointment of a successor.
