= Fabio Duque Jaramillo =

Colombian Roman Catholic prelate (1950–2022)

Fabio Duque Jaramillo O.F.M.
- Bishop of Garzón
- Church: Catholic Church
- Diocese: Diocese of Garzón
- In office: 11 June 2012 – 9 February 2022
- Predecessor: Rigoberto Corredor Bermúdez
- Successor: Jaime Alberto Cabrera Arcos
- Previous post: Bishop of Armenia (2003-2012)

Orders
- Ordination: 29 November 1975
- Consecration: 31 January 2004 by Paul Poupard

Personal details
- Born: 12 May 1950 Armenia, Caldas Department, Colombia
- Died: 9 February 2022 (aged 71) Medellín, Antioquia Department, Colombia
- Coat of arms

Fabio Duque Jaramillo (12 May 1950 – 9 February 2022) was a Colombian Roman Catholic bishop.

Duque Jaramillo was born in Colombia and was ordained to the priesthood in 1975.

He served as bishop of the Roman Catholic Diocese of Armenia, Colombia, from 2003 to 2012 and was bishop of the Roman Catholic Diocese of Garzón, Colombia, from 2012 until his death in 2022.

Jaramillo died on 9 February 2022, at the age of 71, from COVID-19 in Medellín, during the COVID-19 pandemic in Colombia.
