= Diocese of Armenia =

Latin Catholic jurisdiction in Colombia

Coordinates: 4.5323°N 75.6729°W

Diocese of Armenia Dioecesis Armeniensis Diócesis de Armenia

Catholic
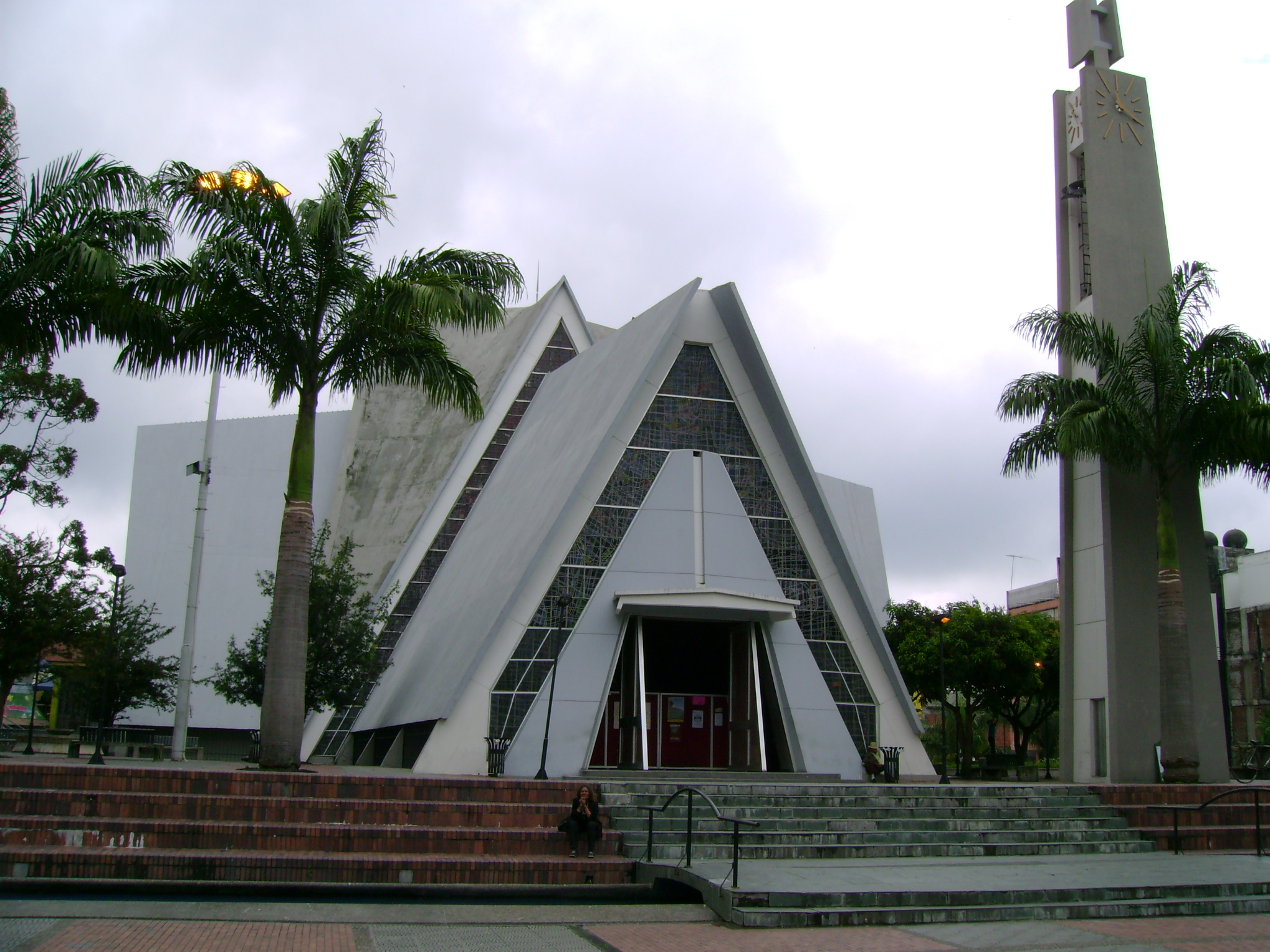
- Cathedral of the Immaculate Conception

- Coat of arms
- Incumbent: Carlos Arturo Quintero Gómez
- Style: The Most Reverend

Location
- Country: Colombia
- Episcopal conference: Episcopal Conference of Colombia
- Ecclesiastical province: Ecclesiastical province of Manizales

Statistics
- Area: 1,845 km^{2} (712 sq mi)
- Population: Total; Catholics: (as of 2022); 562,117; 473,000 (84.1%)
- Parishes: 46

Information
- First holder: Jesús Martínez Vargas
- Denomination: Catholic Church
- Sui iuris church: Latin Church
- Rite: Roman Rite
- Established: 17 December 1952 (73 years ago) by the papal bull Leguntur saepissime of Pope Pius XII
- Archdiocese: Archdiocese of Manizales
- Cathedral: Cathedral of the Immaculate Conception
- Secular priests: 105

Current leadership
- Pope: Leo XIV
- Bishop: Carlos Arturo Quintero Gómez
- Vicar General: Jaime Álvarez Gómez

Map

Website
- www.diocesisarmenia.org

The Diocese of Armenia (Latin: Armeniensis) is a Latin Church ecclesiastical jurisdiction or diocese of the Catholic Church in Colombia. Its episcopal see is Armenia in Columbia's Quindío Department . The diocese is a suffragan in the ecclesiastical province of the metropolitan Archdiocese of Manizales.

== History ==
- 12 December 1952: Established as Diocese of Armenia from the Diocese of Manizales

== Ordinaries ==
- José de Jesús Martinez Vargas (18 December 1952 – 8 February 1972) Retired
- Libardo Ramírez Gómez (8 February 1972 – 18 October 1986) Appointed, Bishop of Garzón
- José Roberto López Londoño (9 May 1987 – 7 October 2003) Appointed, Bishop of Jericó
- Fabio Duque Jaramillo, O.F.M. (29 November 2003 – 11 June 2012) Appointed, Bishop of Garzón
- Pablo Emiro Salas Anteliz, (18 August 2014 – 14 November 2017), appointed Archbishop of Barranquilla
- Carlos Arturo Quintero Gómez (4 December 2018 - present)

== See also ==
- Catholic Church in Colombia
