= Diego Luis Rendón Urrea =

Colombian Roman Catholic bishop (born 1967)

The Most Reverend Diego Luis Rendón Urrea
- Bishop of Jericó
- Church: Catholic Church
- Diocese: Jericó
- Appointed: 13 July 2026
- Installed: 25 August 2026
- Predecessor: Noel Antonio Londoño Buitrago

Orders
- Ordination: 21 November 2000 by Jairo Jaramillo Monsalve
- Consecration: 25 August 2026 by Jairo Jaramillo Monsalve

Personal details
- Born: 3 June 1967 (age 59) Rionegro, Antioquia, Colombia
- Education: Saint Thomas Aquinas University, National University of La Plata
- Motto: Docere et servire (Enseñar y servir)
- Coat of arms: Diego Luis Rendón Urrea's coat of arms

Diego Luis Rendón Urrea (born 3 June 1967) is a Colombian Roman Catholic prelate who has served as a Bishop of Jericó since 2026. He was appointed to the diocese by Pope Leo XIV on 13 July 2026 and received episcopal ordination on 25 August 2026.

== Early life and education ==
Rendón Urrea was born on 3 June 1967 in Rionegro, in the Diocese of Sonsón-Rionegro, Colombia. He completed philosophical and theological studies at the Major Seminary of Santa Rosa de Osos. He subsequently studied at the Saint Thomas Aquinas University in Medellín, and obtained a specialization in Educational Management from the University of San Buenaventura in Medellín and a specialization in Virtual Education Pedagogy from the Fundación Universitaria Católica del Norte. He also undertook doctoral studies in Education at the National University of La Plata in Argentina.

== Priesthood ==
Rendón Urrea was ordained a priest on 21 November 2000 and was incardinated in the Diocese of Santa Rosa de Osos.

His first recorded pastoral assignment was as assistant parish priest of the Immaculate Conception parish in Amalfi in 2001. From 2002 to 2005, he served as rector of the Cibercolegio affiliated with the Fundación Universitaria Católica del Norte and as vicar for Catholic Education. He subsequently served as vocation promoter and delegate for Missionary Pastoral Ministry from 2005 to 2009, as diocesan delegate for Social Pastoral Ministry–Caritas and diocesan vicar for Pastoral Ministry from 2010 to 2011, and as chaplain of the National Training Service (SENA) from 2011 to 2014. From 2014 to 2015 he was parish priest of Nuestra Señora del Carmen in Gómez Plata.

In September 2015, the Bishop of Santa Rosa de Osos appointed Rendón Urrea rector and legal representative of the Fundación Universitaria Católica del Norte for a four-year term beginning 1 November 2015. At the time of his appointment he was parish priest of Nuestra Señora del Carmen in Gómez Plata. The Colombian Episcopal Conference reported that he had previously been rector of the Cibercolegio UCN and director of the institution's basic and secondary education unit.

Rendón Urrea remained rector of the Fundación Universitaria Católica del Norte and its Cibercolegio until his appointment to the episcopate in 2026. The institution became a significant part of his priestly ministry, which he later described as a 15-year period dedicated to "evangelizing through education".

== Episcopate ==
On 13 July 2026, Pope Leo XIV appointed Rendón Urrea Bishop of Jericó, succeeding Noel Antonio Londoño Buitrago. At the time of his appointment, he was rector of the Fundación Universitaria Católica del Norte and the Cibercolegio of the UCN.

Following his appointment, the Diocese of Jericó published his first message to the diocesan clergy, consecrated persons and lay faithful. Rendón Urrea expressed gratitude to the pope and called for ecclesial communion, renewed missionary enthusiasm, shared responsibility and a united response to the Christian vocation.

Rendón Urrea received episcopal ordination on 25 August 2026 at the cathedral in Santa Rosa de Osos. Jairo Jaramillo Monsalve, Archbishop Emeritus of Barranquilla, was the principal consecrator, while Luis Albeiro Maldonado Monsalve, Bishop of Santa Rosa de Osos and Farly Yovany Gil Betancur, Bishop of Montelíbano, were principal co-consecrators.

His canonical installation as Bishop of Jericó is scheduled for 5 September 2026 at the Cathedral of Our Lady of Mercy in Jericó.
