= José Roberto López Londoño =

Colombian Roman Catholic bishop (1937–2018)

- Bishop of Jericó
- Church: Catholic Church
- Diocese: Diocese of Jericó
- In office: 7 October 2003 – 13 June 2013
- Predecessor: Augusto Aristizábal Ospina
- Successor: Noel Antonio Londoño Buitrago
- Previous posts: Bishop of Armenia (1987-2003); Titular Bishop of Urbs Salvia (1982-1987); Auxiliary Bishop of Medellín (1982-1987)

Orders
- Ordination: 26 August 1962
- Consecration: 3 July 1982 by Alfonso López Trujillo

Personal details
- Born: 29 June 1937 Yalí, Antioquia Department, Colombia
- Died: 21 September 2018 (aged 81) Medellín, Antioquia Department, Colombia
- Motto: Non Ministrari Sed Ministrare

José Roberto López Londoño (29 June 1937 – 21 September 2018) was a Colombian Roman Catholic bishop.

López Londoño was born in Colombia and was ordained to the priesthood in 1962. He served as the titular bishop of Urbisaglia and as the auxiliary bishop of the Roman Catholic Archdiocese of Medellin, Colombia, from 1982 to 1987. He then served as bishop of the Roman Catholic Diocese of Armenia from 1987 to 2003 and finally served as bishop of the Roman Catholic Diocese of Jericó from 2003 to 2013.
