= Decoupling (meteorology) =

Decoupling of atmospheric layers over land

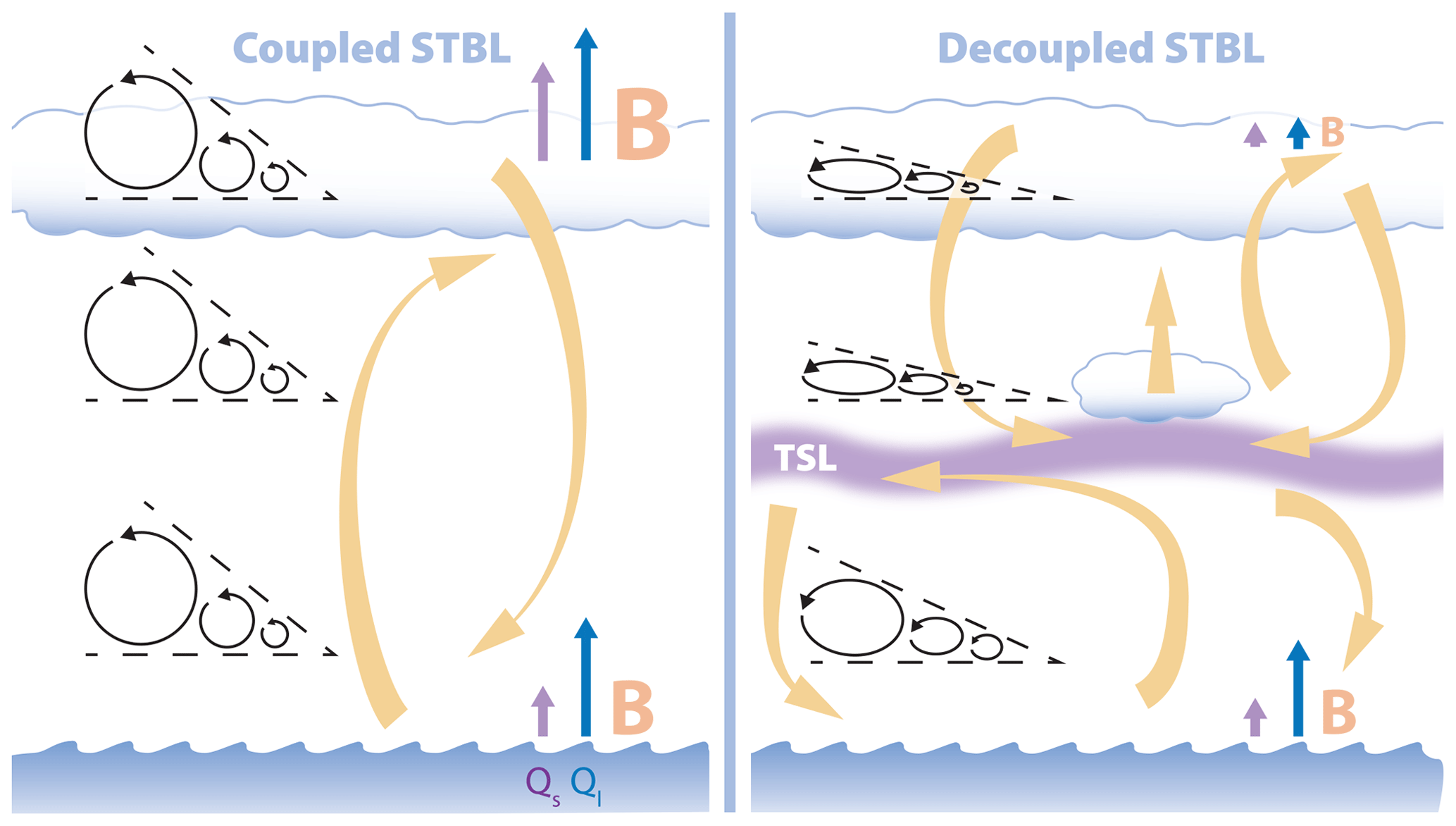
A schematic diagram of showing the main processes of coupled (left) and decoupled (right) stratocumulus-topped atmospheric boundary layers: primary circulation (yellow arrows), turbulence eddy cascade (circular arrows confined in an angle with extent proportional to inertial range scaling exponent p), TKE buoyancy production (red B letter of size proportional to strength), sensible and latent heat fluxes (purple and blue arrows, respectively, of length proportional to strength) at the surface and in the cloud-top region.

In weather forecasting, decoupling is a process in which two adjacent layers of Earth's atmosphere stop interacting.

== Process ==
During the day when the sun shines and warms the land, air at the surface of the earth is heated and rises. This rising air mixes the atmosphere near the earth. At night, this process stops and air near the surface cools as the land loses heat by radiating in the infrared. If winds are light, air near the surface of the earth can become much colder, compared to the air above it, than if more mixing of air layers occurred.

== Climate impacts ==
In mountain valleys at high altitudes, such as those in the Cascade Mountains, decoupling may alter the localized impacts of climate change, as it causes a drastic change in surface and atmospheric temperatures. In coastal regions of the Greenland ice sheet, decoupling may simultaneously help conserve ice sheet mass while limiting new accumulation of ice.
