= Acerias Paz del Rio =

Acerías Paz del Río
- Company type: Private
- Industry: Siderurgy
- Founded: 1948
- Headquarters: Paz de Río, Colombia
- Key people: Fabio Hernando Galán Sánchez (CEO)
- Products: Steel & Iron
- Revenue: ▲US$ 4,14 Million (2023)
- Number of employees: 3200
- Parent: Grupo Trinity S.A (55.27%); Structure S.A (27.27%); IDEBOY (13,27%)
- Website: https://www.pazdelrio.com.co/

Acerías Paz del Río is a Colombian steel and iron company and controlled by Grupo Trinity S.A.

Founded in 1948 under the name "Empresa Siderúrgica Nacional de Paz de Río". The company's full production began in 1954, when it was renamed Acerías Paz del Río, S.A. In 2007, the Brazilian business group Votorantim acquired 51.1% of the company's shares. In 2022, the business group Trinity Capital acquired 67% of the company's shares.

== See also ==
- Paz de Rio
