= Giovanni Buscaglione =

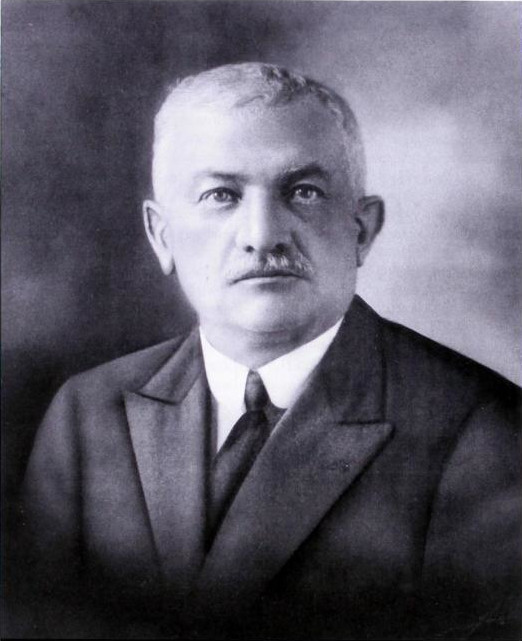
Giovanni Buscaglione

Giovanni Buscaglione (March 10, 1874 – January 29, 1941) was an Italian-Colombian architect and priest. He designed series of important projects of religious and educative architecture in Italy, Constantinople, İzmir and Alexandria but was especially noted for his work in Colombia, a country where he spent his later years and contributed a significant number of architectural works.

== Biography ==
Buscaglione was born on March 10, 1874 in Graglia. He spent two years of his childhood with San Juan Bosco, one of the great educators of the 19th century and founder of the congregations of San Francisco de Sales and of the Daughters of Helping Maria, both dedicated to the education and development of poor young people. Then, he studied electronic engineering in the Albertina Academy of Turin, and developed an interest in sketching ecclesiastical architecture with father Ernesto Vespignani, designer of several churches and schools in South America and he soon had a number of schools in Egypt and Turkey in which he would design in Istanbul and Alexandria. He was soon under contract to undertake architectural work in Colombia, and arrived at Bogotá, the Colombian capital in 1920. Soon after his arrival he became co-assistant and first director of the office of engineering, and was appointed in that same year at the Colegio Salesiano.

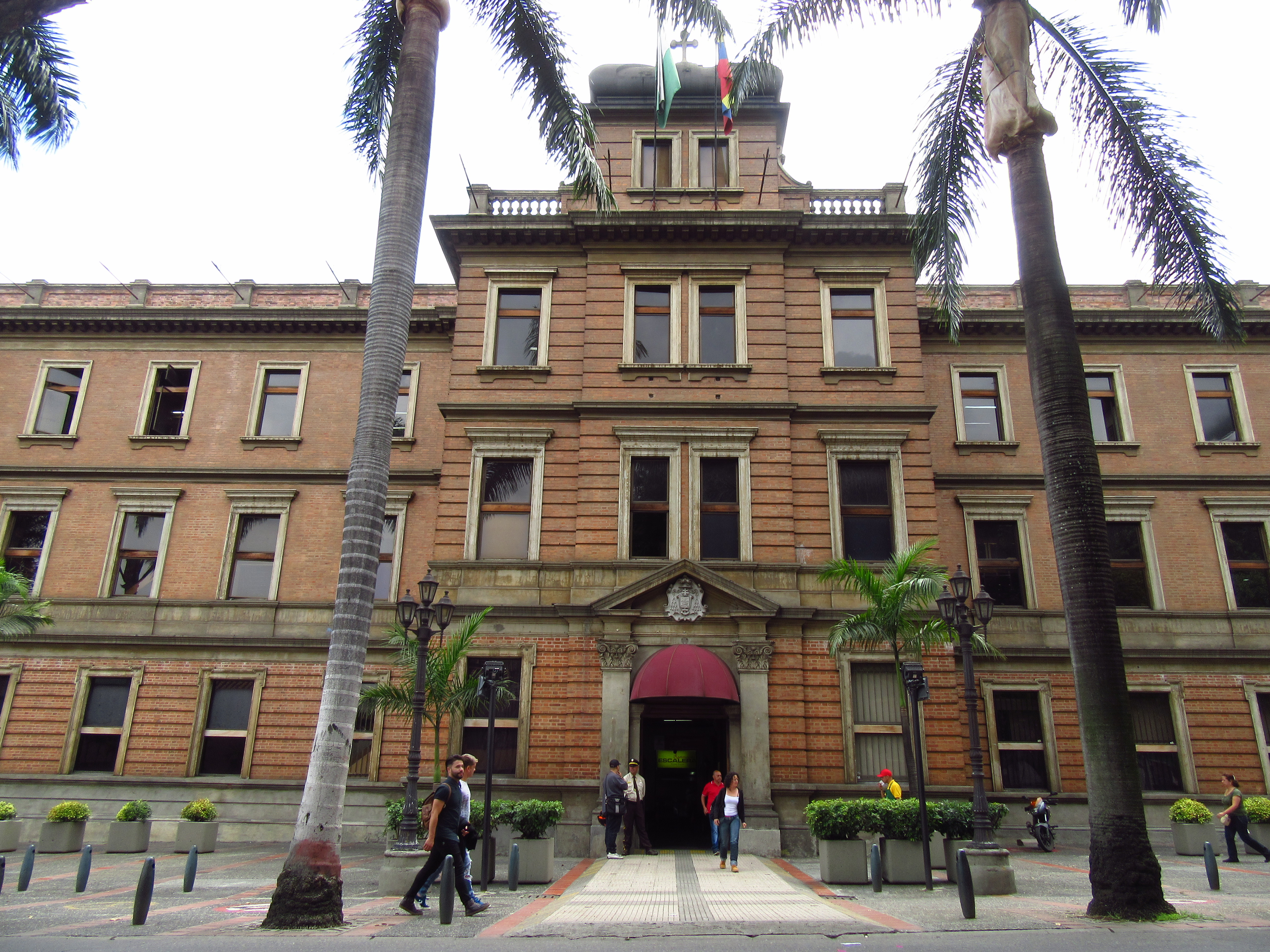
Antiguo Seminario Mayor de Medellín, Villanueva, Medellín

Through this office, he was permitted to work as a priest and design a wide variety of religious buildings and schools in Colombia over a period of twenty years, until his death in 1941. He conducted surveys for reforms, constructing chapels, sanctuaries, seminaries, convents, agricultural farms, schools and even devised a project for a university in Medellín. He designed buildings across multiple departments of Colombia including Amazonas, Antioquia, Bolívar, Boyacá, Cundinamarca, Meta, Santander and Valle del Cauca. He also focused in the education of young people from underprivileged backgrounds, carrying on the work in the country, which he had been involved in back in Italy and had once been taught under. The primary objective was to provide to religious, technical and artistic education to Colombian boys in the Schools of Arts and he was responsible for training capable workers in graphical arts, carpentry, mechanics and construction of buildings. Buscaglione was able to provide his personal knowledge towards architectural education and taught the constructive details, the structural calculations and measurements red and how to create molds for the casting of columns, arcs, and decorative bricks.

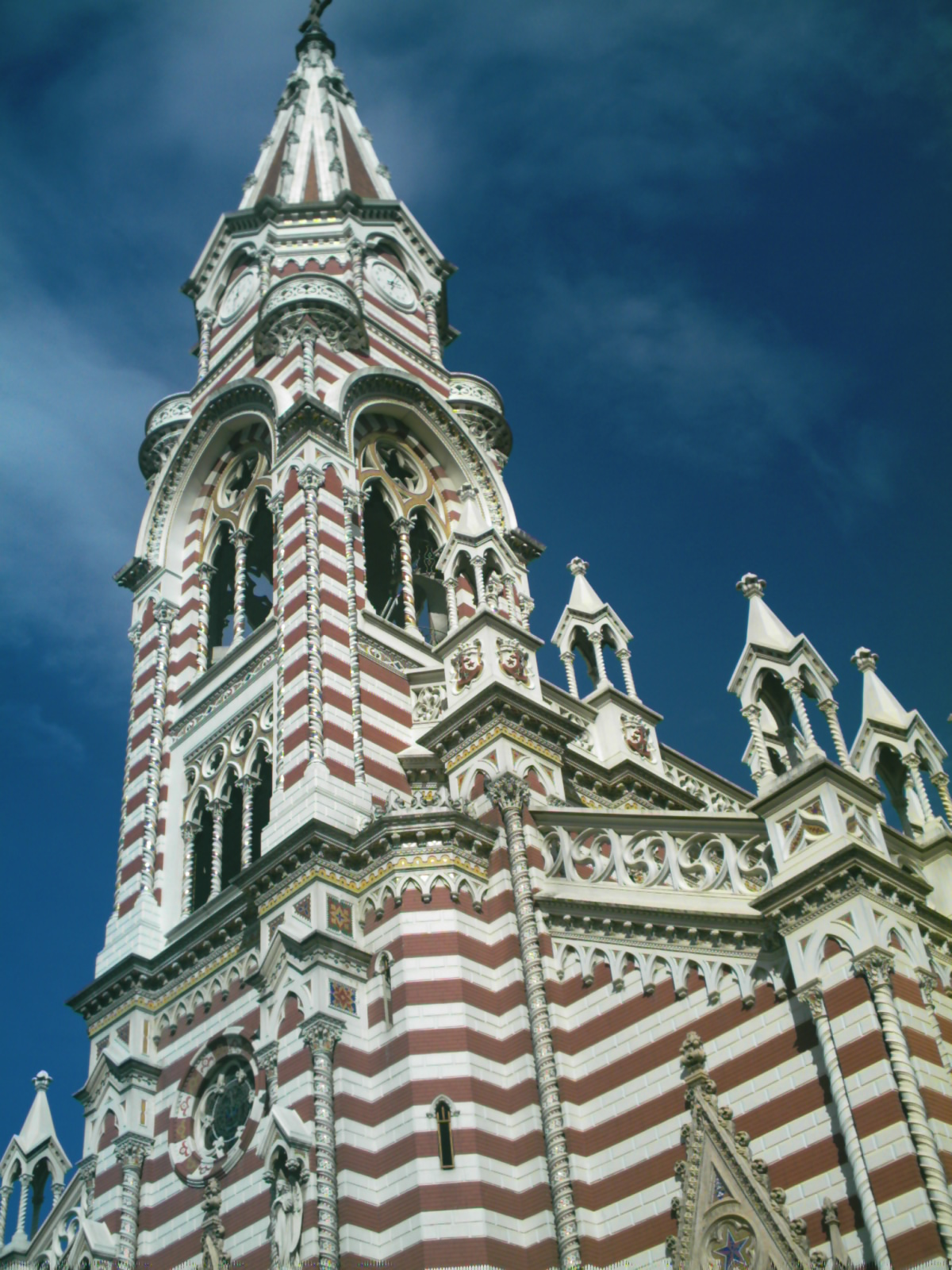
Santuario Nacional Nuestra Señora del Carmen, Bogotá

Buscaglione's architectural style in Colombia was a stylistic expression influenced by his Italian roots but also incorporated styles of Islamic architecture in the near east which he had become fond of during his time in Turkey and Egypt in İzmir, Istanbul and Alexandria. This was reflected in his works such as the Greater Seminary of Medellín (1919–1928) – today a commercial center, the Colegio de León XIII (1922–1938) and the Santuario Nacional de Nuestra Señora del Carmen (1926–1938) in Bogotá, considered his masterpiece. The Florentine Gothic style was prevalent in his work, and he was under contract to construct more than thirty churches and chapels under the national reformation programme during which the Metropolitan Cathedral of Medellín was completed. The tower rises 57 meters above the vestibule, characterised by its ornate white facade. It was declared National Monument of Colombia in 1993

Buscaglione died in 1941.
