= Jardín =

- Municipality and town
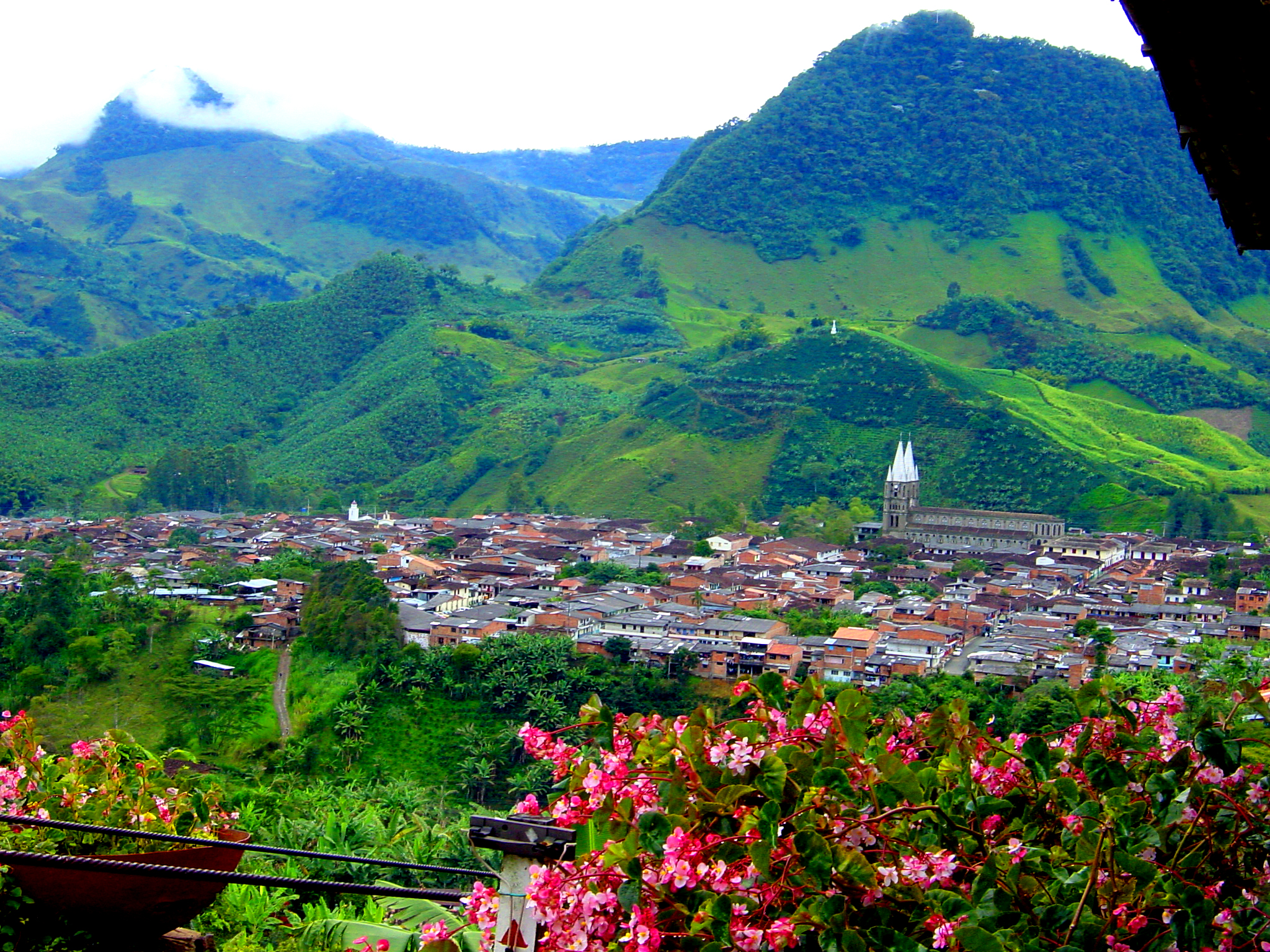
- Jardín, Colombia in October 2006

- Flag Coat of arms

- Location of the municipality and town of Jardín in the Antioquia Department of Colombia

- Location in Colombia
- Coordinates: 5°35′55″N 75°49′10″W
- Country: Colombia
- Department: Antioquia Department
- Subregion: Southwestern

Area
  - Total: 224 km^{2} (86 sq mi)

Population (Census 2018)
  - Total: 13,541
  - Density: 60.5/km^{2} (157/sq mi)
- Time zone: UTC-5 (Colombia Standard Time)
- Website: www.eljardin-antioquia.gov.co

Jardín (English: Garden), is a town and municipality in the southwest region of Antioquia, Colombia. It is bounded by the Andes, Jericó, and Támesis municipalities to the north and the Caldas department to the south. The municipality is located between the San Juan River and a branch of the Western Cordillera. Jardín is identified by its preserved architectural heritage, lush vegetation, and abundant rivers and streams.

Among others, rivers that flow through Jardin include the San Juan, Claro, and Dojurgo. Trout caught in the local rivers is a popular dish in the area.

The municipal anthem of the town is "Hymn to Jardín". Mean daily temperatures are 19°C with moderate humidity.

According to the 2018 census, the population comprised 13,541 people.

== Toponymy ==
Regarding the name "Garden" (Spanish: Jardín) that belongs to this town, legend says that when the founders came to the Alto de las Flores ("Flower hilltop"), from the Sietecueros village, they saw the valley that is today Jardín. At the time, it was entirely a jungle, full of white snakewood and crossed by two riachuelos. On seeing the beauty of the area, the settlers began to call it a garden.

== History ==
The earliest evidence of human settlement in the area comes from graves that probably belonged to people of the Chamíes ethnicity and Catio language. These people were also known as "Docatoes", after the nearby Docató River (today the San Juan River).

Colonization of Antioquia was at its peak in the 1860s. During this time, a settler named Indalecio Peláez claimed huge tracts of land between two riachuelos known as Volcanes and El Salado in 1863. In 1864, Dr. José María Gómez Angel, a well-known priest, and two other priests came to Jardín after fleeing from General Mosquera, who at the time was in Medellín. These priests came up with the idea to create a more independent village in the area, and they discussed this idea with the aforementioned farmers and early settlers.

In 1871 Jardín was declared a parish. In 1882 it was declared a town by Luciano Restrepo, who at the time was the president of the then Antioquia State.

In 2012, the Colombian government named Jardín a heritage town of Colombia, making it the second municipality in Antioquia to earn the distinction.

== Climate ==
Jardín has a subtropical highland climate (Cfb) with abundant rainfall year-round.

Climate data for Jardin (Miguel Valencia), elevation 1,570 m (5,150 ft), (1981–2010)
Month	Jan	Feb	Mar	Apr	May	Jun	Jul	Aug	Sep	Oct	Nov	Dec	Year
Mean daily maximum °C (°F)	25.3 (77.5)	25.8 (78.4)	26.0 (78.8)	25.6 (78.1)	25.3 (77.5)	25.7 (78.3)	25.8 (78.4)	25.7 (78.3)	25.1 (77.2)	24.6 (76.3)	24.8 (76.6)	25.1 (77.2)	25.4 (77.7)
Daily mean °C (°F)	19.0 (66.2)	19.5 (67.1)	19.7 (67.5)	19.7 (67.5)	19.5 (67.1)	19.5 (67.1)	19.3 (66.7)	19.3 (66.7)	18.8 (65.8)	18.7 (65.7)	18.8 (65.8)	18.9 (66.0)	19.2 (66.6)
Mean daily minimum °C (°F)	15.1 (59.2)	15.2 (59.4)	15.4 (59.7)	15.7 (60.3)	15.4 (59.7)	15.0 (59.0)	14.5 (58.1)	14.7 (58.5)	14.7 (58.5)	14.8 (58.6)	15.1 (59.2)	15.0 (59.0)	15.1 (59.2)
Average precipitation mm (inches)	96.1 (3.78)	101.3 (3.99)	166.4 (6.55)	231.0 (9.09)	250.9 (9.88)	187.6 (7.39)	172.2 (6.78)	183.5 (7.22)	230.2 (9.06)	237.9 (9.37)	194.9 (7.67)	120.4 (4.74)	2,172.4 (85.53)
Average precipitation days (≥ 1.0 mm)	15	16	18	23	25	20	18	20	24	26	22	15	241
Average relative humidity (%)	78	77	77	79	81	79	78	78	80	81	80	79	79
Mean monthly sunshine hours	148.8	141.2	148.8	126.0	136.4	168.0	186.0	170.5	135.0	117.8	129.0	155.0	1,762.5
Mean daily sunshine hours	4.8	5.0	4.8	4.2	4.4	5.6	6.0	5.5	4.5	3.8	4.3	5.0	4.8
Source: Instituto de Hidrologia Meteorologia y Estudios Ambientales

Climate data for Jardin (Jardin El), elevation 2,005 m (6,578 ft), (1981–2010)
Month	Jan	Feb	Mar	Apr	May	Jun	Jul	Aug	Sep	Oct	Nov	Dec	Year
Mean daily maximum °C (°F)	22.2 (72.0)	22.6 (72.7)	22.4 (72.3)	22.1 (71.8)	21.8 (71.2)	21.8 (71.2)	21.9 (71.4)	21.9 (71.4)	21.7 (71.1)	21.4 (70.5)	21.3 (70.3)	21.7 (71.1)	21.9 (71.4)
Daily mean °C (°F)	17.1 (62.8)	17.4 (63.3)	17.3 (63.1)	17.3 (63.1)	17.2 (63.0)	17.1 (62.8)	17.0 (62.6)	17.0 (62.6)	16.8 (62.2)	16.7 (62.1)	16.7 (62.1)	16.9 (62.4)	17.1 (62.8)
Mean daily minimum °C (°F)	13.2 (55.8)	13.5 (56.3)	13.7 (56.7)	13.9 (57.0)	13.9 (57.0)	13.5 (56.3)	13.1 (55.6)	13.1 (55.6)	13.2 (55.8)	13.2 (55.8)	13.3 (55.9)	13.3 (55.9)	13.4 (56.1)
Average precipitation mm (inches)	111.4 (4.39)	136.5 (5.37)	222.4 (8.76)	266.5 (10.49)	304.3 (11.98)	244.3 (9.62)	197.5 (7.78)	210.2 (8.28)	283.5 (11.16)	280.2 (11.03)	232.1 (9.14)	156.8 (6.17)	2,645.7 (104.16)
Average precipitation days (≥ 1.0 mm)	18	17	24	26	27	22	21	21	25	27	25	21	272
Average relative humidity (%)	84	84	84	86	87	86	84	84	86	86	88	86	85
Mean monthly sunshine hours	127.1	129.9	93.0	81.0	93.0	108	127.1	136.4	111.0	108.5	78.0	99.2	1,292.2
Mean daily sunshine hours	4.1	4.6	3.0	2.7	3.0	3.6	4.1	4.4	3.7	3.5	2.6	3.2	3.5
Source: Instituto de Hidrologia Meteorologia y Estudios Ambientales

== Architecture ==
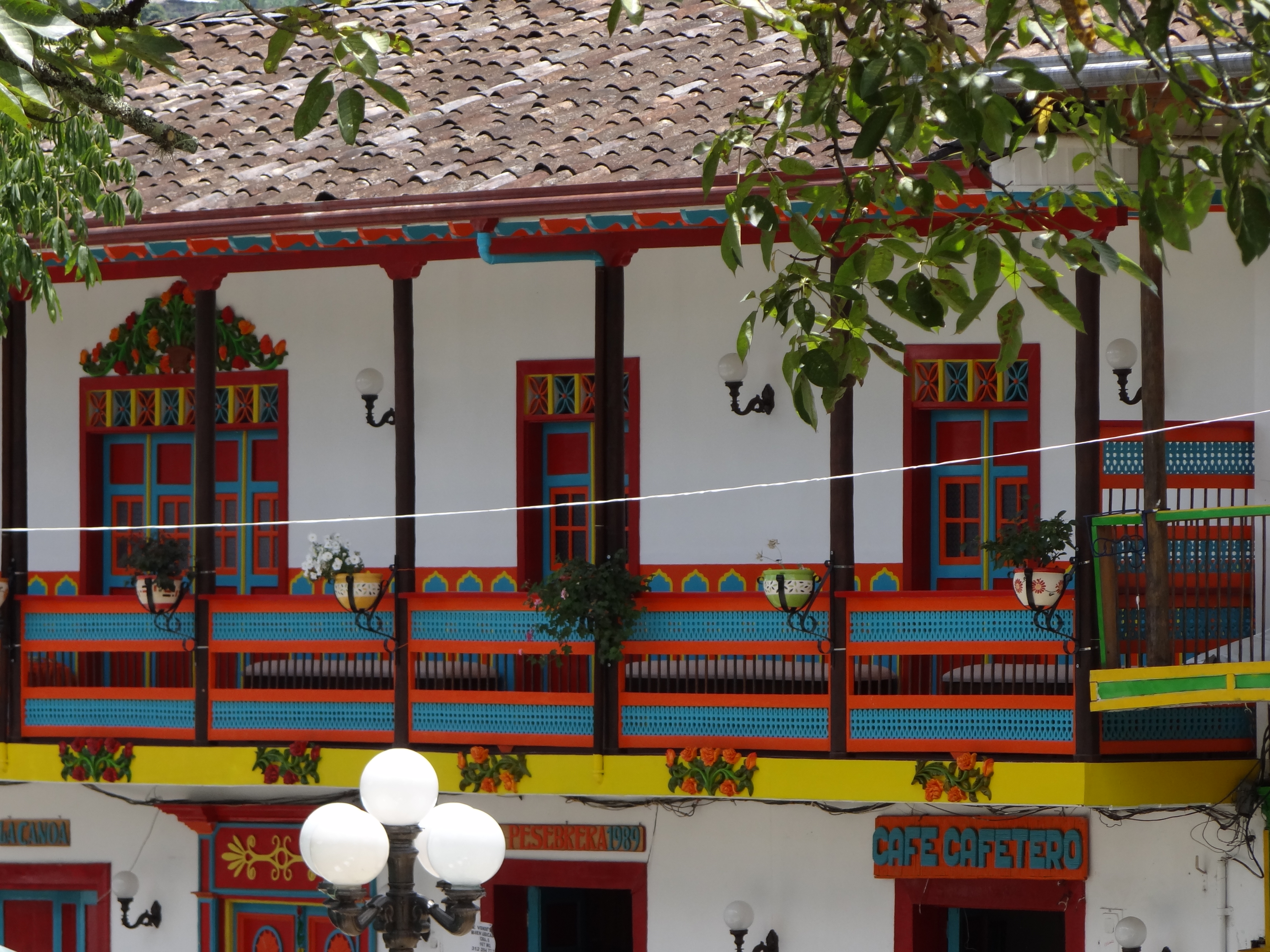
An example of the colorful balconies typical of Jardín.

Unlike some other municipalities of Antioquia, Jardín has remained largely unchanged for the last 140 years. The colonial architecture predominant throughout the area is characterized by whitewashed buildings with brightly painted doors, balconies, and cowhide chairs. Several of the chairs are hand-painted with scenes and landscapes from the local culture.

== Demographics ==
According to figures presented by the National Administrative Department of Statistics 2005 census, the ethnographic makeup of the town is as follows:

- Mestizo and White: 89.3%
- Indigenous: 10%
- Afro-Colombian: 0.7%

== Economy ==
- Agriculture: coffee, plantain, sugarcane, and beans
- Tourism
- Trout fishing
- Artisan crafts, traditionally made by nuns

In the past, most inhabitants dedicated their lives to growing coffee, plantains, beans and sugarcane. Today, tourism is in this city is a basic source of income. The town is unique in having over 40 hotels, when larger municipalities of Antioquia usually do not have more than ten.

== Places of interest ==
=== Main plaza ===
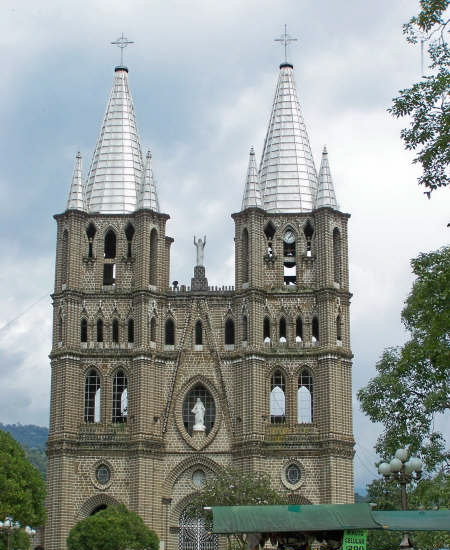
Basilica of the Immaculate Conception

Like many traditional towns, the plaza is the main center of activity in Jardín. Principal Park, also known as El Libertador plaza, was declared a national monument of Colombia in 1985. It is frequently visited for its nearby shops and inns. The floor is paved with rocks from the Tapartó river. The site features color wooden chairs and several gardens.

The town's main church is the Basilica of the Immaculate Conception, declared a National Monument of Colombia in 1980. This basilica was built from hand-cut stones from the Tapartó river nearby in a Neo-Gothic style. It was declared a minor basilica in 2003.

=== Cable-car ride ===
Completed in 2007, Jardín has two cable-car lines. The lines were created to help peasants from the villages of La Selva, La Linda and La Salada enter the town to sell their goods and then return, and also to boost tourism.

One cable-car ride to a local mountain peak known as the Flower Hilltop (Spanish: Alto de las Flores) or Cristo Rey, in reference to the statue on site, provides a great view of the town. It has a balcony for looking at the town and a cafe. As of Fall 2018, this cable car is not currently in operation, however you can also arrive by hiking.

The second cable-car ride goes to a viewpoint by the name of La Garrucha on the opposite side of town from Alto de las Flores. There is a cafe and balcony with another great view of the town. This viewpoint can also be reached by vehicle or as part of a 4 mile hiking loop.

=== Other attractions ===
Paintball in the Jardín countryside has also become a popular pastime in recent years.

Jardín is surrounded by several nature reserves that are popular tourist destinations. One example is where La Herrera ravine and La Bonita ravine join together, forming what is known as the "Heart Puddle" (Spanish: Charco Corazón).

Other places of interest include the following:

- Touring the colorful balconies of the houses and buildings in the municipality, many of which feature flowers.
- Cave of Splendor, which can be reached by walking 10 kilometers from the town.
- Clara Rojas Museum has 19th century furniture and relics from the colonization period of Antioquia.
- Yellow-eared Parrot Nature Reserve
- Moto-Ratón Tour - These so-called "motorcycle mouses" are motorcycles that pull a small cart with people. They take visitors on a tour throughout the town.
- Trout farms, especially the "Estadero El Arka".
- Dulces de Jardin is a famous confectionery shop in the area, started in 1995 by Mariela Arango.
- César Moisés Rojas Peláez House of Culture, which houses the ashes of Colombian writer Manuel Mejía Vallejo. This building opened in 1880.
- Santa Gertrudis Chapel
- "Morro Amarillo", which houses an indigenous cemetery.
- Chorro Blanco
- Café JARDÍN
- Parque Natural Jardín de Rocas

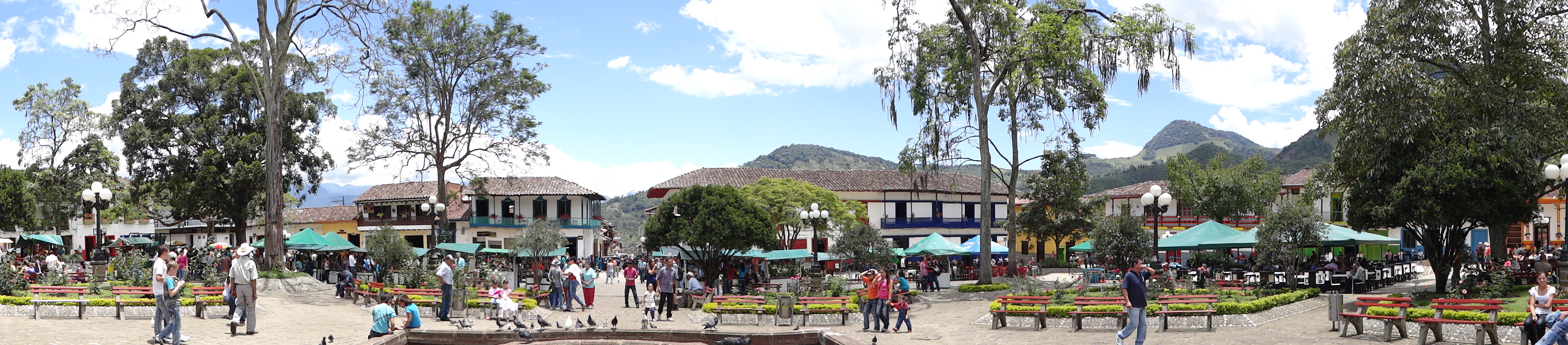

== Gallery ==
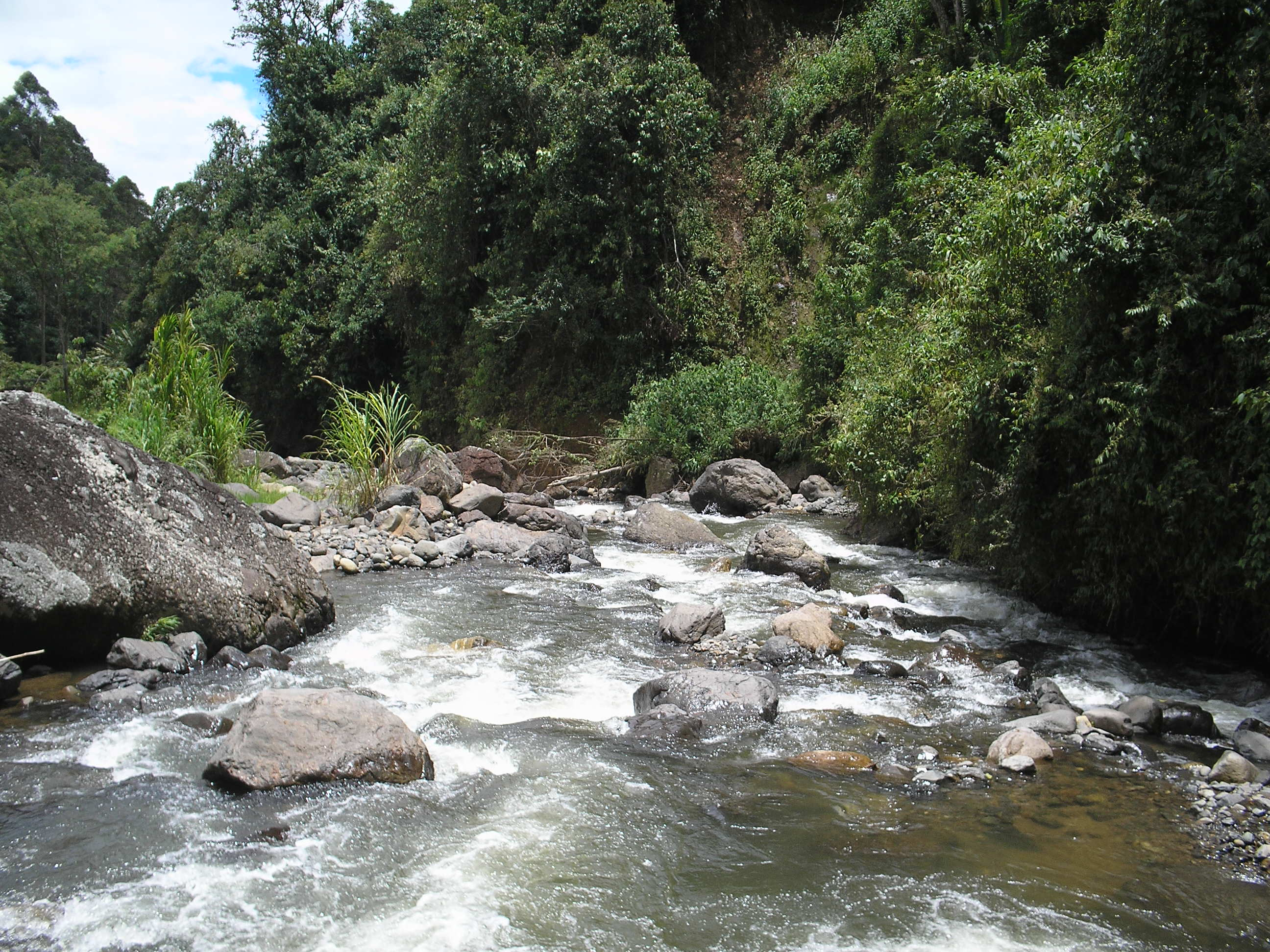
La Herrera ravine

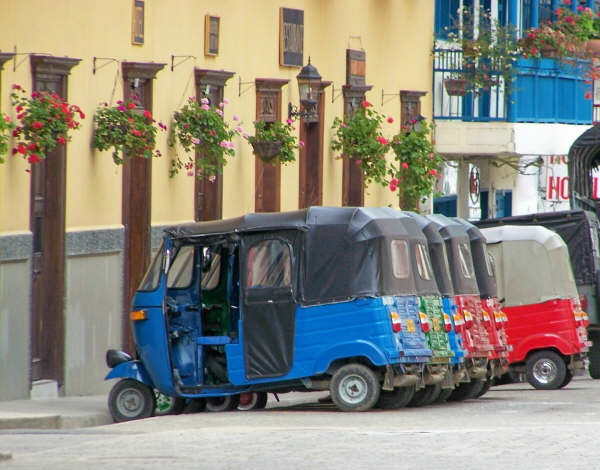
Example of "motor mouses"

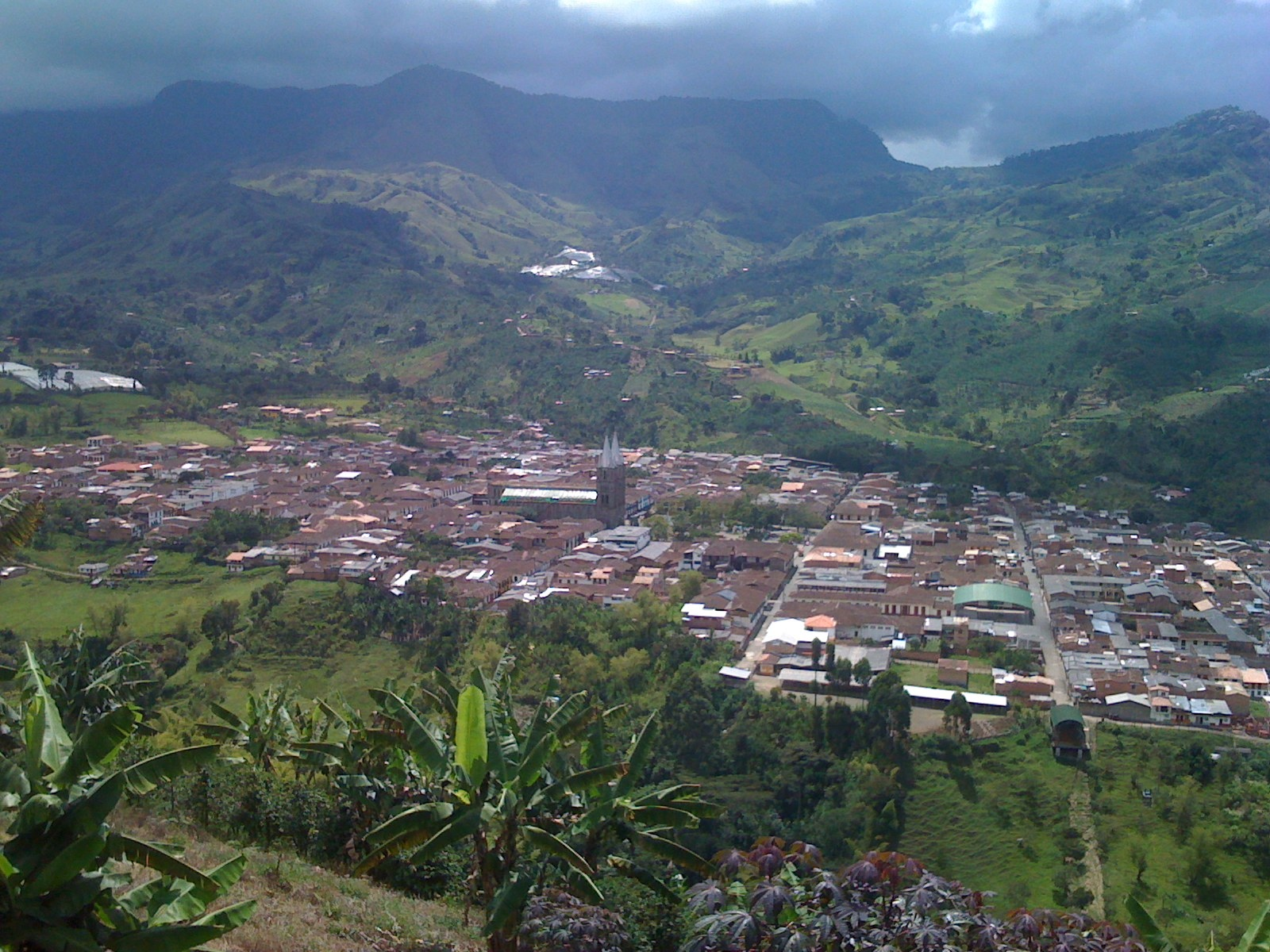
View of Jardín from the top of a cable-car stop

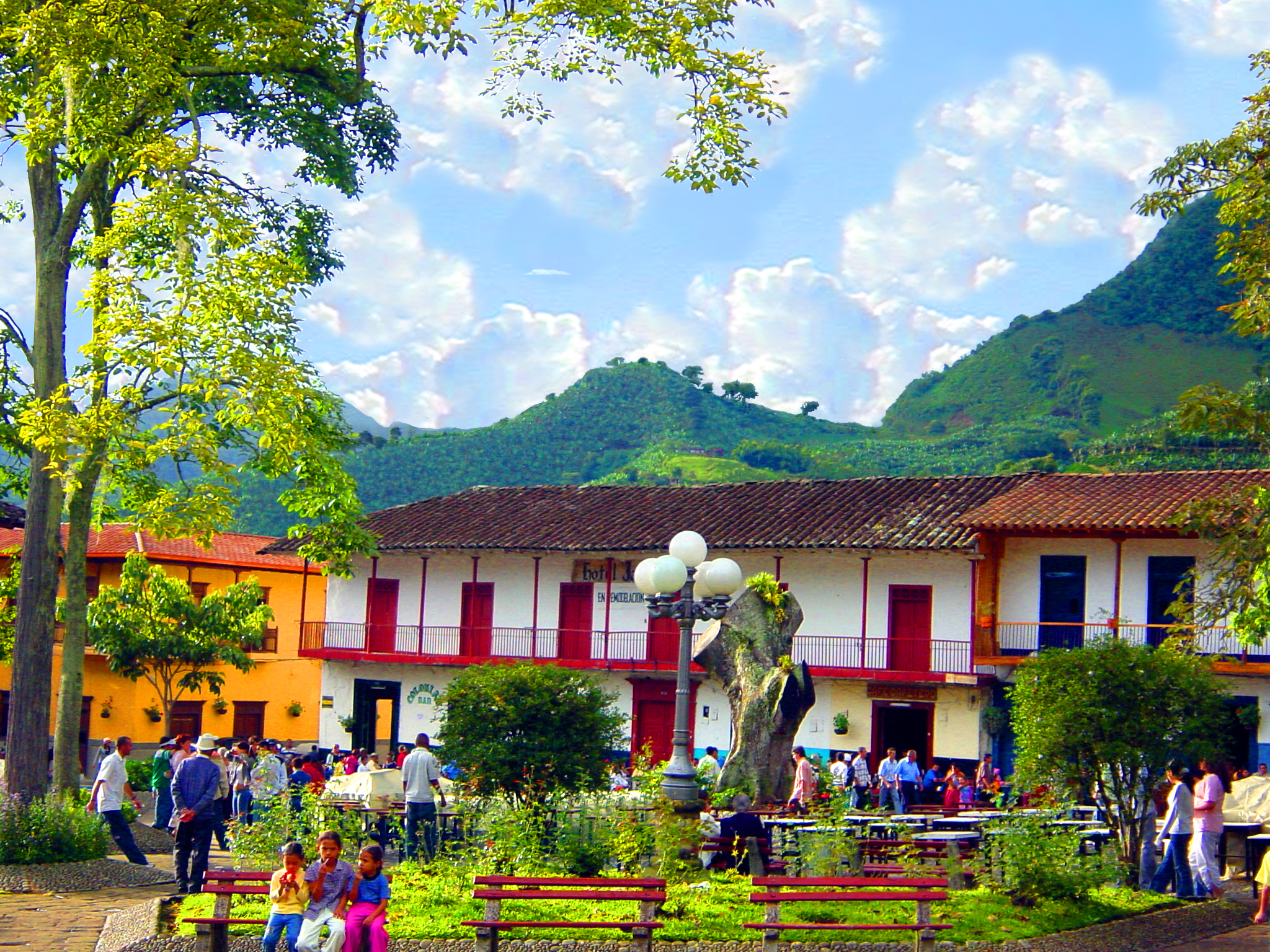
Principal Plaza

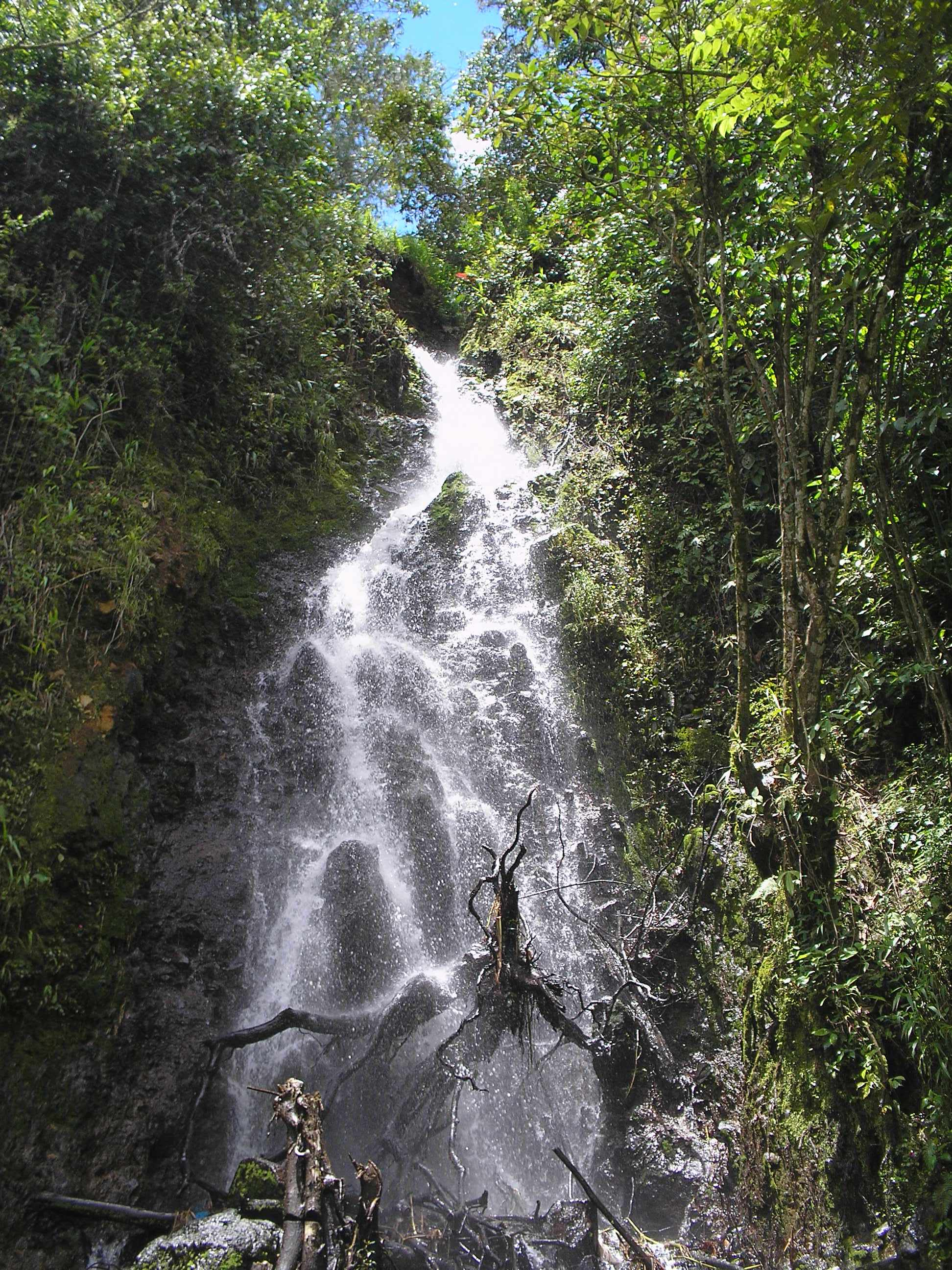
Angel Waterfall
