= University of Valle =

Public university in Cali, Valle del Cauca, Colombia

Universidad del Valle
- Other names: Univalle
- Former names: Industrial University of Valle del Cauca (1945 - 1954)
- Motto: La mejor para los mejores
- Motto in English: The best university for the best students
- Type: Public, departmental
- Established: June 11, 1945
- Academic affiliations: ASCUN, AUIP, SUE, Universia
- Rector: Guillermo Murillo Vargas
- Academic staff: 1,161 FTE
- Administrative staff: 1,228
- Students: 30,320
- Undergraduates: 27,725
- Postgraduates: 2,595
- Doctoral students: 211
- Location: Cali, Valle del Cauca, Colombia; 3°22′30.04″N 76°32′4.03″W
- Campus: CUM, 1,000,000 m^{2} (250 acres) San Fernando, 39,960 m^{2} (9.87 acres) Urban
- Colors: Red and white
- Sporting affiliations: ASCUN Southwest Division
- Website: www.univalle.edu.co

The University of Valle (Spanish: Universidad del Valle), also called Univalle, is a public, departmental, coeducational, research university based primarily in the city of Cali, Valle del Cauca, Colombia. It is the largest higher education institution by student population in the southwest of the country, and the third in Colombia, with more than 30,000 students. The university was established by ordinance No. 12 of 1945, by the Departmental Assembly as the Industrial University of Valle del Cauca (Spanish: Universidad Industrial del Valle del Cauca), under the leadership of Tulio Ramírez Rojas and Severo Reyes Gamboa.

The university has two campuses in Cali. The main one, known as University City of Melendez (Spanish: Ciudad Universitaria Meléndez, CUM), is located in the southern neighborhood of Melendez and hosts the faculties of Engineering, Humanities, Integrated Arts, Sciences, and Social Sciences and Economics, as well as the institutes of Education and Pedagogy, and Psychology. Its second one, located in the centric San Fernando neighborhood, hosts the faculties of Administration Sciences and Health. The university also has several satellite campuses across the department in the cities of Buenaventura, Buga, Caicedonia, Cartago, Palmira, Tuluá, Yumbo, and Zarzal, and one campus in the neighboring Cauca department in the city of Santander de Quilichao. The university offers education at technological, undergraduate and postgraduate levels, with 258 academic programs, which includes 65 master and medical specialties, and 8 doctorates. Also, it hosts an excellence research center, six research centers, three research institutes, and 204 research groups.

The university is member of several university organizations including the Association of Colombian Universities (ASCUN), the Iberoamerican Association of Postgraduate Universities (AUIP), and the Iberoamerican University Network Universia. The Valle, National and Antioquia universities form what is known as the Golden Triangle of higher education in Colombia, being among the most selective and competitive universities in the country. It is one of the 15 universities in the country to have received a high quality institutional accreditation by the Ministry of Education, through resolution 2020 of June 3, 2005. The accreditation was for eight years, making the university one of only a few to be accredited for such a duration. The university is considered a premier school in the country and usually excels in its Health and Engineering programs.

== History ==
=== Establishment and early years ===
Since the late 19th century the idea of creating a university in Cali had been an ambition of the people of the city and of the Valle del Cauca Department, and was continuously discussed and mentioned in the local newspapers. At the time, the only further education degrees awarded in the department were awarded by the Santa Librada College in Cali and the Academic College of Buga, which focused on the liberal arts. In the 1940s, the necessity for qualified professionals that could supply the demand of the new industrial sector of Valle del Cauca made it clear that an institution focusing on scientific and technological education was of strategic importance to the development of the region. Despite the idea of its creation being met with some skepticism, the University of Valle was established by the ordinance number 12 of June 11, 1945, by the Departmental Assembly as the Universidad Industrial del Valle del Cauca. The leaders behind the establishment of the university were Tulio Ramírez Rojas, born in La Union Valle, who would become the first rector of the university, and Severo Reyes Gamboa, the departmental secretary of education at the time.

The university began its work in 1945 in a small house located in downtown Cali, with faculties of Agronomy, Business, and Nursing. In 1946 the Faculty of Chemistry was established, followed by the Faculty of Architecture in 1947, and in 1948 the Faculty of Electrical Engineering, which changed its name in 1949 to the Faculty of Electromechanical Engineering. At this early stage, the university faced its first financial crisis, a situation that was preceded by the destitution of the rector Ramírez in 1949 by political reasons, and caused by the diminishing support of the local government. The crisis, which almost ended in the university closure in 1950, would represent one of many chapters of the financial difficulties faced by the university in its history.

After the crisis was overcome, in 1950 the Faculty of Medicine was established, and began its work in 1951 on the campus of the Santa Librada College. Then, in 1954 started the construction of the San Fernando campus for the Faculties of Medicine, Nursing, and Architecture. This same year, by ordinance number 10 of 1954, the university changed its name to Universidad del Valle, established as part of the university government an Academic Council and an Administrative Council, the latter with the participation of representatives of different sectors of the community.

In 1955, under the tutelage of rector Mario Carvajal, the university opened the School of Graduate Studies in Medicine, and its publishing house was established under the name of University of Valle Library (Spanish: Biblioteca de la Universidad del Valle). In 1957, the university began its technical and further education programs with the establishment of the schools of Medical Laboratory Technicians and Engineering Auxiliaries in Topography and Roads. At the end of the 1950s, the university comprised five faculties and three schools, 556 students, 174 professors, and 159 administrative staff. Its budget had risen to $5.73 million COP and its patrimony to approximately $20 million COP.

=== Academic consolidation and the student movement ===
In 1962, the Office of University Planning was established with the objective of developing a general plan for the university, which included the construction of a new campus, and the development of the regional university system by the creation of satellite campuses in the intermediate cities of the department. The new campus, located in the southern part of the city was construed on donated land and financed by a loan requested from the Inter-American Development Bank (IDB), the creation of a revenue stamp, and the request for a part of the land value tax revenues of the adjacent neighborhoods. In 1964 the Schools and Faculties were reorganized into Divisions and Departments, which translated into an increased academic activity. At the time, five divisions were established with the reorganization: Architecture, Economy, Engineering, Health, and Sciences; and two more were created: Education and Humanities. By 1968 the university begun its internationalization process and an increment of its postgraduate programs, thanks to several donations made by several foreign foundations. By the end of the 1960s, the university had 5302 students, 453 full-time and 174 part-time professors, of which 9% had a Doctorate, 20% a Masters, and 21% a Specialist degree.

At this time, the first serious student revolts started to emerge, motivated by the local and global changes of the decade, like the Vietnam war, the European student movement, the presence of the Peace Corps in Latin-America and specially in Colombia, the rejection of the IDB loan and the presence of the foreign foundations. On February 15, 1971, after the unconsulted election of the Dean of the Division of Social Science and Economics, some students took the rectory. This marked the first incursion of the police force to the university campus, and 11 students and four soldiers were killed on February 26 in the fight to retake the campus. For these events, some professors and students were expelled of the university. Nevertheless, the support for the rector dropped, who had to resign. Since mid February to April, the university was closed until the new rector was appointed.

In 1975 the university changed again its organizational structure into Faculties, and new programs were created, for example Social Communication and Journalism, Social Work were established in the Faculty of Humanities. In 1977, in order to avoid the desertion of several faculty members, it was established the professorship career system based in academic, investigative, and administrative merits. In 1976, with the creation of the Socio Economical Research Center, the first steps into the creation of the Sociology program in 1978 were taken.

=== Social projection, research and technological development ===
In 1983, the Department of Administration branched out of the Faculty of Engineering and constituted the actual Faculty of Administration Sciences. In 1985, the Professorial Statute Committee was created to determine the procedures related to the professorial career. The same year, the first agreements for the development of joint research projects were signed with the Ministry of National Education, COLCIENCIAS, the UNESCO, and the OAS, among others. This agreements are the cornerstone for the development in the 1990s of the Doctoral degrees offered by the university. Also, in the 1980s, and thanks to the establishment of a revenue stamp by the Congress of the Republic, the university began the establishment of its satellite campuses. At first, the courses presented in this campuses were only foundation courses, which required to the students its finalization in the main campus to obtain their degrees, until 1995, when all the satellite campuses allowed the finalization of the program.

In 1994, the Institute of Education and Pedagogy and the School of Psychology are established. In 1995, from the fusion of the faculty of Architecture, and the programs of Social Communication, Drama, and Music is established the Faculty of Integrated Arts. This same year, the accreditation process of all the programs was carried out.

The incomes from the revenue stamp created a surplus in the university finances, which were poorly administrated. Excessive amounts of the budget were directed to the establishment of research institutes and centers, creation of new professorial chairs, and the construction of several buildings, the establishment of a technological infrastructure, including Internet access, creating a deficit in the universities accounts. This situation, together with the increasing cost of the retirement plans and the delay in its payments, were the causes of the financial and institutional crisis of 1998, which ended in the closure of the university in the second semester of 1998 and the suspension of payment to all the academic and administrative staff members.

=== Institutional accreditation and current standing ===
In early 1999, the university restarted its operations after several difficulties. The work of Rectors Emilio Aljure Nasser and Oscar Rojas Rentería, allowed the creation of the Retirement Fund in 2000 with the participation of the Ministry of Finance and Public Credit, the Governor of Valle del Cauca and the university, which has managed since then the retirement plans for all the staff. Also, the debt contracted with the private banking sector was renegotiated and will be paid in full by 2010, and the wages were paid.

In 2000 a new curricular adjustment was made, with the objective to fulfill all the quality accreditation requirements. In 2001 the coverage was increased by the aperture of the programs each semester and the creation of nocturnal courses. The same year, the research system was implemented and the Publishing House was reopened.

== Campus ==
=== Melendez campus ===
The main campus, also known as University City of Melendez, is located in the southern neighborhood of Melendez in the city of Cali, between the Calle 13 or Pasoancho Avenue and the Calle 16, and the Carrera 86 and Carrera 100. It is one of the largest campuses in Colombia, with 1,000,000 m^{2} (250 acres) of land donated by the Garces Giraldo Brothers. The architectural project, which won the national architecture prize in 1972, was the work of several members of the faculty under the coordination of the architect Jamie Cruz. During its construction it was used as Olympic village for the 1971 Pan American Games.

The campus can be roughly divided in two by the Jaime Garces B. Avenue that runs in an east–west direction. The northern part, which is also the largest, is mostly undeveloped. The developed area is enclosed by the Tulio Ramirez Avenue, and it is composed of more than 30 buildings, including the main administration building, the faculties of Science and of Engineering, part of the faculty of Integrated Arts, and the Mario Carvajal Library, which is the main library of the university.

The southern part includes the University Sports Center, which is composed of a main stadium, with an athletic track and seating for 3020 spectators; eight soccer courts; four basketball/volleyball courts; the Alberto León Betancour Arena; an Olympic size swimming pool; and four tennis courts. It also includes the faculties of Humanities, Social Sciences and Economics, the remaining part of the faculty of Integrated Arts, the institute of Education and Pedagogy, the institute of Psychology, and the main dining hall.

The landscape of the campus, designed by architects Lyda Caldas and Harold Borrero, imitates the savanna environment of the Cauca River valley. The campus contains 4,250 trees from 182 species, some of which are endangered in the country.

=== San Fernando campus ===
The San Fernando campus, located in the central neighborhood of the same name in Cali was the main location of the university from its construction in 1954 until 1962. This campus, with an area of 39,960 m^{2} (9.87 acres), shares grounds with the "Evaristo Garcia" University Hospital of Valle (Spanish: Hospital Universitario del Valle "Evaristo García"), and can be roughly divided in two by the Calle 4B which runs in the south–north direction. The western part is surrounded by the Carrera 36, the Carrera 36B, and the Calle 4 is the largest section contains the Faculty of Administration Sciences, most of the Faculty of Health, and the San Fernando Library. The eastern part, which is adjacent to the hospital, contains the School of Nursing, the San Fernando University Sport Center, and the administrative buildings.

=== La Carbonera campus ===
The campus at the city of Palmira is located in La Carbonera sector between the Carrera 31 and the La Carbonera Avenue, in a 50,000 m^{2} (12 acres) terrain donated by the sugar mill company Manuelita S.A.. The project is to be completed in three stages, and was designed by an interdisciplinary team led by the Research Center in Territory, Construction and Space, and the School of Civil Engineering and Geomatics of the university. The construction of the first phase of the first stage started on June 15, 2007, and was inaugurated on June 11, 2009, correspond to a three-story building with a surface area of 5,200 m^{2} (1.3 acres), with a cost of $6 billion COP. The new building has a library, five laboratories for chemistry, biology, electronics, physics, and food analysis; an auditorium for 150 spectators, and 27 class rooms with Internet access. The second and third planned phases for the first stage are the construction of a similar building and an auditorium for 1,500 spectators.

=== Satellite campuses ===
The university also has other seven satellite campuses in other cities of the Valle del Cauca Department and one in the Cauca Department. These are located in the cities of Buenaventura (Pacific campus), Buga, Caicedonia, Cartago, Santander de Quilichao (Northern Cauca campus), Tulúa, Yumbo, and Zarzal.

== Organization ==
University of Valle organization diagram

The university's highest government body is the University Council which is formed of eleven members: the governor of Valle del Cauca, the rector, the general secretary, and representatives for the President of the Republic, the Ministry of Education, deans, professors, alumni, students, former rectors, and the productive sector.

Academic affairs are overseen by the Academic Council, which is formed of seventeen members: The rector, the general secretary, the vice-rectors for Academics, Administrative Affairs, Research, and University Welfare; the deans of the eight faculties; the directors of the two institutes and the offices of Planning and Regionalisation; two representatives for the professors, one representative for academic programs, and two representatives for the students.

The rector is the chief executive officer and is elected for a four-year period with the possibility of reelection. The current rector is Iván Enrique Ramos Calderón, who started his term in 2003 and was reelected for a second term in 2007. The rectory has six dependencies: the Direction of Regionalisation, the offices of Information and Telecommunications, Internal Control, Institutional relationships, Legal Affairs, and Planning and Institutional Development; and the General Secretary.

The Vice-Rector's Office at the university is structured into four main areas, each with distinct responsibilities. The Vice-Rector for Academics oversees the development and coordination of academic programs and policies. Administrative and financial operations fall under the Vice-Rector for Administrative Affairs, who ensures that these processes align with the institution's mission. Research initiatives, both social and scientific, are guided by the Vice-Rector for Research, responsible for formulating and proposing related policies. Finally, the Vice-Rector for University Welfare manages programs that support the well-being of the university community, including health, sports, and recreational activities.

Each academic division, either faculty or institute, has a directive council. These include the dean or director, the vice-deans or sub-directors of academics and research, the academic and administrative coordinators, the director of each school, department, or area; and a representative for the professors and for the students. Also, each division has an extension and communication office. The research centers or institutes affiliated to the academic divisions are independent organizations at the same level as the schools, departments, or areas.

== Academics ==
=== Student profile ===
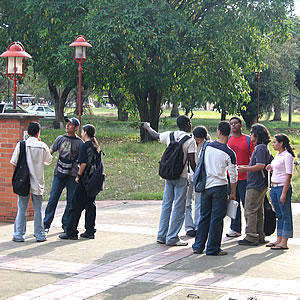
Students at the Faculty of Integrated Arts

As of 2024, the University of Valle enrolls approximately 35,000 students. Of these, around 30,000 are undergraduate students, while about 3,000 are enrolled in graduate programs, including specializations, master's, and doctoral studies. In that year, the university admitted 5,481 students across two academic periods, resulting in an acceptance rate of about 88.01%.

In 2023, the University of Valle graduated a total of 5,106 individuals, including 3,016 bachelor's degrees, 923 technologists, 551 master's degrees, 510 specialists, and 106 doctoral degrees. This figure represents one of the highest outputs in the country, reflecting the institution's significant impact both regionally and nationally. Notably, the number of female graduates exceeded that of male graduates, indicating a growing trend of female leadership and contribution to the region's skilled workforce. The diversity of the student body is also evident during graduation ceremonies, where members of Colombian indigenous communities proudly display their traditional attire, symbolizing integration and the inclusive processes fostered by the alma mater.

In 2024, the University of Valle was recognized among Colombia's top institutions based on the results of the Saber Pro exams, administered by the ICFES. According to a Ministry of Education resolution issued on December 4, 2024, the university ranked eighth nationally, with 35 students achieving top-tier scores.

=== University profile ===
The university has eight faculties and two institutes that between them offer 258 academic programs. 181 of these are undergraduate programs, and 94 are postgraduate, including eight doctoral degrees by research. Of this, 189 programs are offered in the city of Cali, and 69 in the regional campuses. The duration of the programs are three years for an Associate, five years for a Bachelor, one and a half years for a graduate diploma, two years for a Master, and five years for a Doctorate. As of 2009, 30 of the undergraduate programs have received a high quality accreditation from the ministry of education. In 2005, the university received an overall high quality accreditation from the Ministry of National Education, making it one of 15 in the country to have received such an award. The accreditation was for eight years, a period surpassed only by those given to the Antioquia and Andes universities.

By 2008 the faculty consisted of 836 tenured full-time professors, 32.9% female and 67.1% male, and 411 full-time equivalent non-tenured professors. The highest academic degree attained by each member of the faculty broke down as follows:

- doctorate: 25%
- masters: 39%
- specialist: 19%
- undergraduate: 16%

The average age of the faculty was 49 years of age, with 39.9% between the ages of 46 and 55, and 29% between 36 and 45 years old.

The university has signed 86 cooperation agreements with educative and governmental institutions around the globe, including 24 agreements with Spanish institutions and 10 with American institutions. The agreements include documentation exchange, double degree programs, joint research projects, and mobility programs for professor, researcher, and student exchange. Some of the high-profile agreements are with the German Academic Exchange Service, the Clemson and Tulane Universities, and the EPFL. The university is also member of several associations which include the ASCUN, AUIP, CINDA, IOHE, and the Universia network.

The Farallones Local Area Network allows the access of more than 4,200 computers to a 10 Mbit/s dedicated Internet link provided by the High Speed University Network (Spanish: Red Universitaria de Alta Velocidad, RUAV), which provides the member universities with the infrastructure for advanced services such as access to digital libraries, telemedicine, telepresence and Videoconferencing, as well as educational resources including virtual campuses and laboratories. The RUAV is part of the National Academic Network of Advanced Technology (Spanish: Red Nacional Académica de Tecnología Avanzada, RENATA), which is connected to the Internet2 and GÉANT networks through the Latin American Cooperation of Advanced Networks (Spanish: Cooperación Latino Americana de Redes Avanzadas, CLARA).

==== Faculties ====
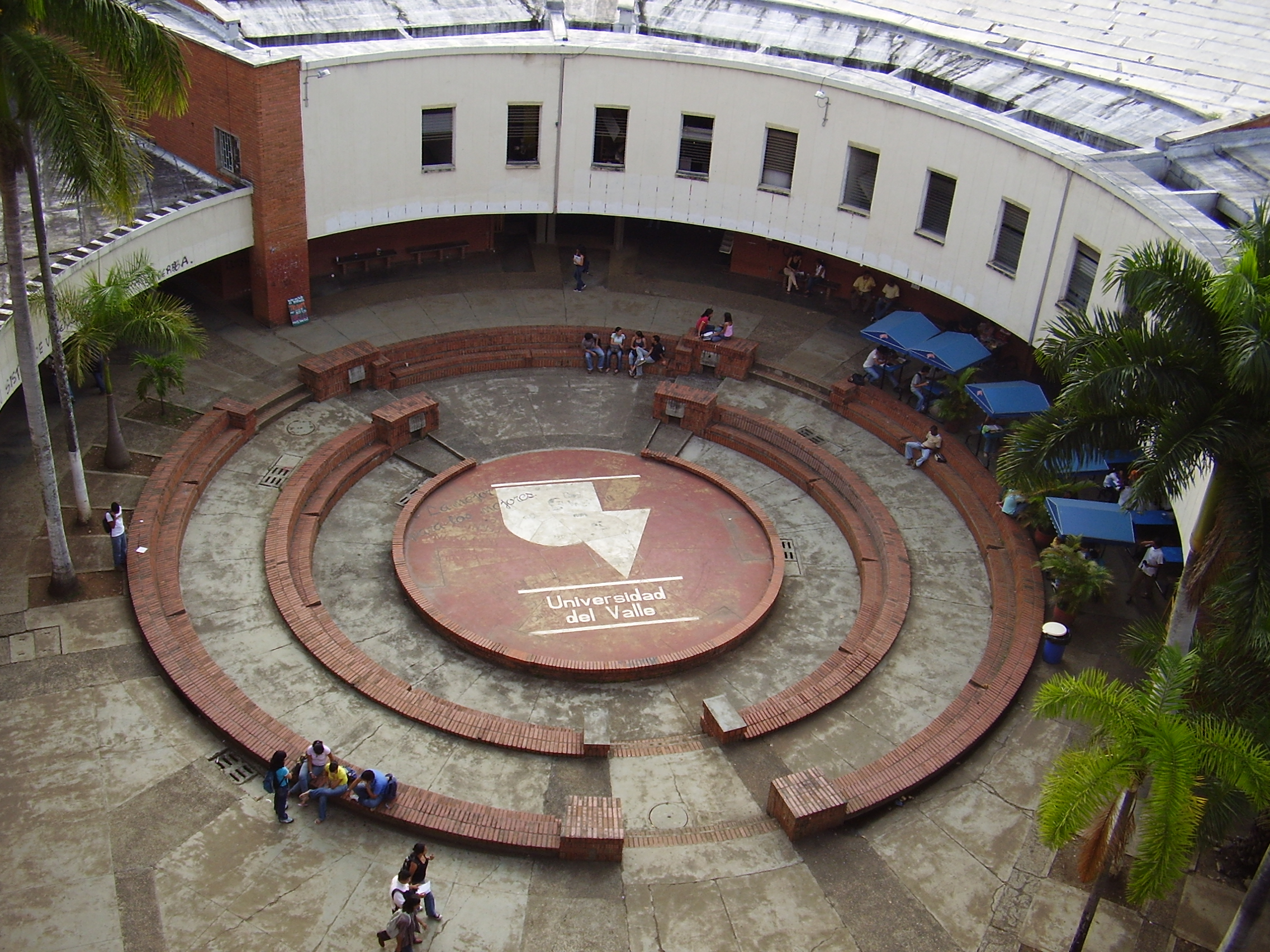
Faculty of Engineering: The Plaza

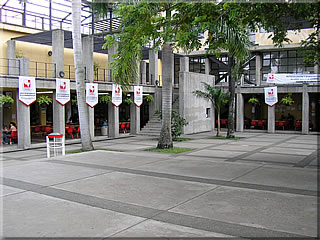
Faculty of Health

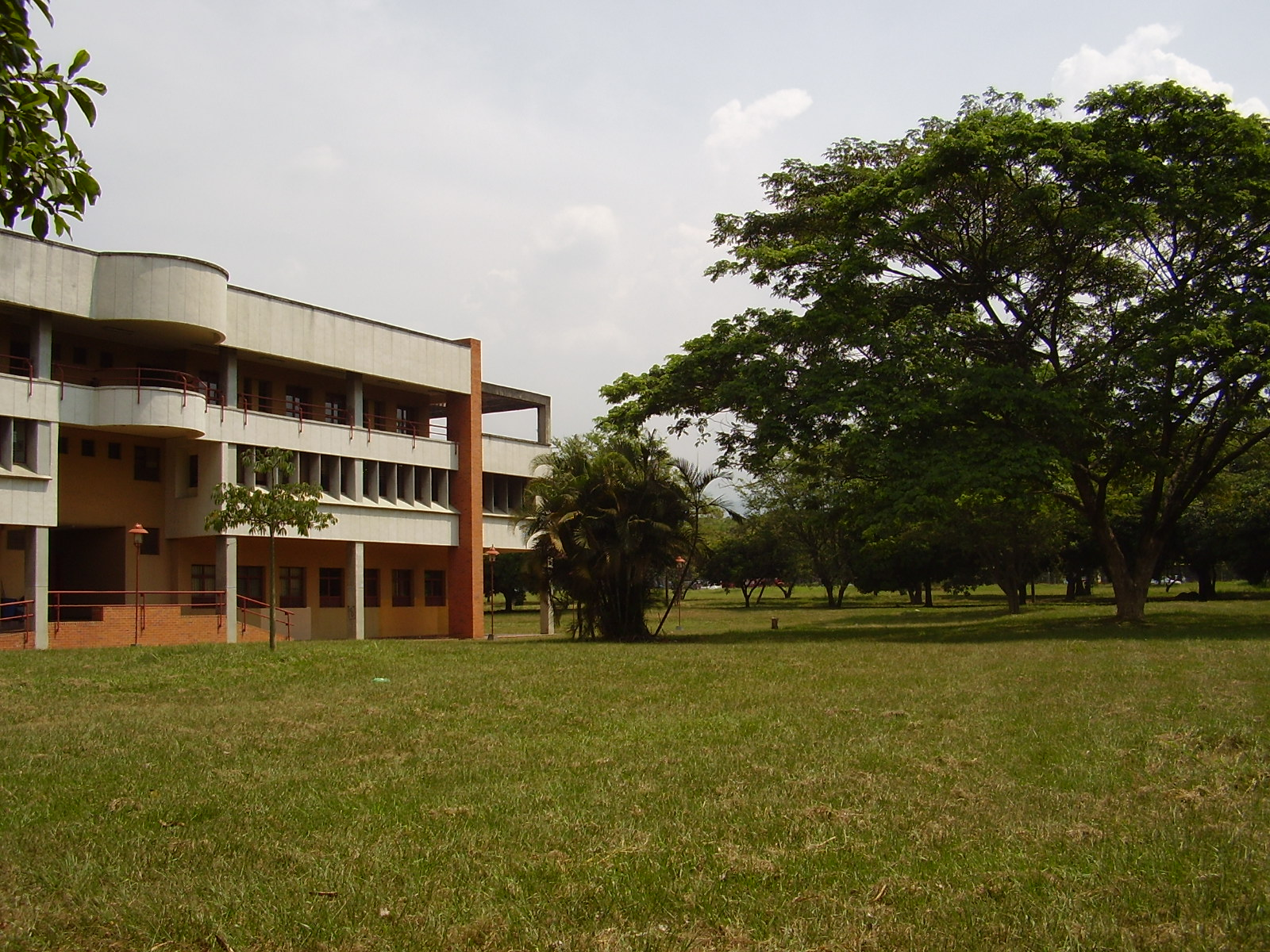
Faculty of Arts: School of Music

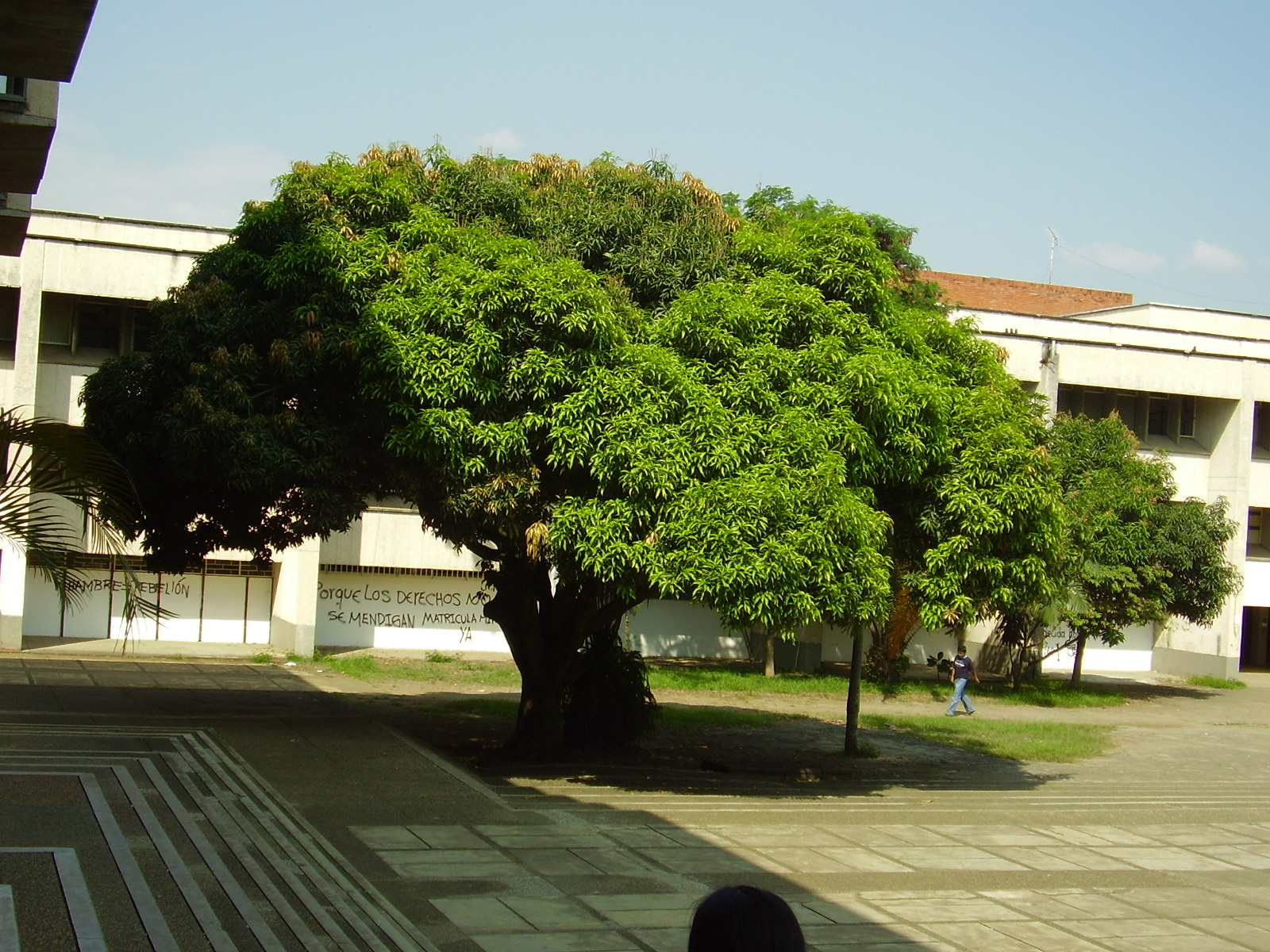
Faculty of Natural and Exact Sciences

The Faculty of Administration Sciences was established on July 26, 1984, but its origins can be traced to the administration courses offered for engineering students since 1961. It offers the undergraduate programs of Bachelor of Business Administration, Accountancy, Commerce, and an Associate degree in Technology of Executive Management. It also offers graduate diplomas in Finances, Strategic Marketing, Quality and Productivity Administration, Public Administration, Public Management and Policies; and the master's degrees in Business Administration, Organization Sciences, and Public Policies.

The Faculty of Engineering, established February 14, 1947 is the largest faculty by student population and number of tenured professors. It offers the degree of Bachelor of Engineering with emphasis in Agricultural, Civil, Chemical, Electronics, Electrical, Food, Industrial, Materials, Mechanical, Sanitation, and Surveying engineering, the degree of Professional in Statistics, and the Associate of Engineering degree in Ecology and Environmental Management, Electronics, Food Processing, Information Systems, and Soil and Water Management and Conservation. It also offers 14 graduate diplomas; and a Master by research degree in 10 areas of emphasis and one Doctoral by research degree in 5 areas of emphasis.

The Faculty of Health was established in 1969 as the Health Division, from the merge of the Faculty of Medicine, and the Schools of Nursing, Laboratory Technicians, and Physiotherapy Technicians. It has the largest number of postgraduate students in the university, and the second in number of tenured professors. It offers 10 undergraduate programs which includes the degrees of Physician and Surgeon, Nurse, and Dentist, 3 graduate diplomas in medical administration, 22 medical specialties, 4 nursing specialties, 3 dentistry specialties, 5 Master's degrees, and a Doctorate in medical research with 3 emphasis areas.

The Faculty of Humanities was established in September 1964 as the Humanities Division. It offers the degrees of Bachelor of Arts in Geography, History, Philosophy, and Social work; and the Bachelor of Education with emphasis in Foreign Languages, Geography, History, Letters, and Philosophy. It also offers 6 graduate diplomas, and 4 Master of Arts degrees by research.

The Faculty of Integrated Arts was established on April 21, 1995, by the fusion the former faculty of Architecture and the Departments of Design, Music, Scenic Arts, Social Communication, and Visual Arts and Aesthetics. It offers the undergraduate degree of Bachelor of Arts with emphasis in Graphic and Industrial Design, Dramatic Art, Architecture, Social communication and Journalism, Music, Visual Arts, and the degree of Bachelor of Education with emphasis in Music. It also offers the graduate diplomas of Landscaping and Administration of Construction Enterprises.

The Faculty of Natural and Exact Sciences was established in February, 1966, it offers the degree of Bachelor of Science with emphasis in Biology, Chemistry, Mathematics, and Physics, and the Associate of Science in Chemical Technology. It also offers the graduate diplomas in Chemical Technology, Entomology, and Ethnobiology; the graduate degrees by research of Master and Doctor of Science with emphasis in Biology, Chemistry, Mathematics, and Physics.

The Faculty of Social Sciences and Economics was established in 1975, by the fusion of the Departments of Social Sciences and Economics. Its origins can be traced to 1958, when the Division of Economics was created. It offers the bachelor's degrees in Economics and Sociology, and the master's degrees by research in Applied Economics, and Sociology.

==== Institutes ====
The Institute of Education and Pedagogy was established on February 10, 2003, to replace the Faculty of Education, established in 1962. It offers the undergraduate degree of Bachelor of Education, with emphasis in Basic Education, Math and Physics, Physical Education and Sports, Popular Education; and the degrees of Professional in Recreation, Professional in Political studies and conflict resolution, and Professional in Sport Sciences. It also offers the graduate degrees by research of Master and Doctor of Education.

The Institute of Psychology was established on February 10, 2003. It offers the undergraduate degree of Psychologist and the graduate degrees by research of Master and Doctor of Psychology.

==== Libraries ====
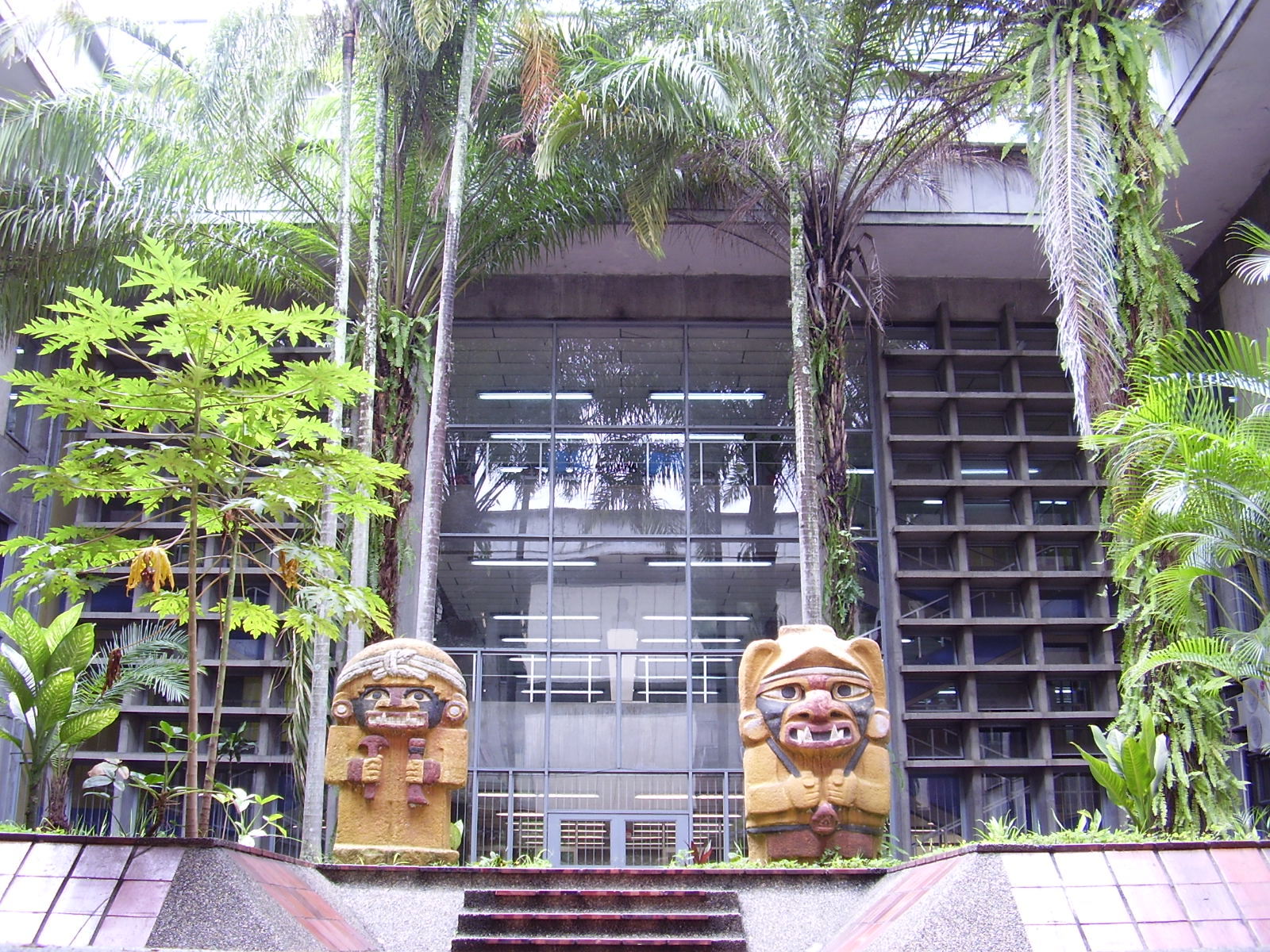
Mario Carvajal library: Las Palmas Plaza

The university library system is managed by the Library Division, created in 1963, and has three central libraries, six documentation centers, one specialized library, and nine regional libraries. By 2008, the library collection was composed of 681,928 titles, 51% of which were books or thesis in printed and digital format, and 37% were printed or microfilm journals and magazines. The Mario Carvajal Library, which was created under the technical advice of the Rockefeller Foundation, is one of the largest university libraries in the country with 18,000 m^{2} (4.4 acres) of constructed space.

=== Rankings ===
The following is a summary of the University of Valle rankings:

Publications	2009	2010	2011	2012
QS World University Rankings ^{[A]}			601+(5)	601+(5)
QS Latin American University Rankings ^{[A]}			54(5)	44(5)
Webometrics Ranking of World Universities ^{[A]}^{[B]}			955(5) / 1049 (4)	839(4)
University Ranking by Academic Performance ^{[A]}		1253(4)		
SCImago Institutions Rankings ^{[A]}	1626(3)	1835(4)	1778(4)	
Ranking U-Sapiens Colombia ^{[B]}^{[C]}		3 / 3	3	

1. Parenthesis number indicates national ranking
2. This ranking is published twice a year. Semesters are separated by "/"
3. This is a national ranking only

The university is consistently ranked among the top five higher education institutions in Colombia.

== Research ==
The university has a long tradition in research that can be traced to its origins. It is home to an excellence research center, six research centers, three research institutes, and 276 groups, of which 164 are recognized by COLCIENCIAS. In 2007 276 research projects were carried out, with an investment totaling $8.84 billion COP provided by fifteen national and international entities.

The Excellence Center for Novel Materials (Spanish: Centro de Excelencia en Nuevos Materiales, CENM) is part of a high-priority national effort, supported primarily by COLCIENCIAS and implemented by 19 recognized multidisciplinary research groups in 10 universities across the nation. Additionally, it gets international support from four world-renowned institutions: The Nanotechnology center from Northwestern University, the Thin Film and Nanoscience Group from the University of California at San Diego, the Department of Civil and Environmental Engineering from the University of Michigan, and the Center for Advanced Interdisciplinary Research on Materials from the University of Chile. Research work at CENM is organized around four Interdisciplinary Research Themes (IRT), which are: Advanced Coatings, Composite Materials, Nano-magnetism, and Solid State Devices, Sensors, and Mesoscopic Systems. The center acquired in 2008 an Atomic force microscope, the first in South America, with a cost of $620 million COP.

=== Academic publisher ===
The University of Valle Publishing Program (Spanish: Programa Editorial de la Universidad del Valle), is the publishing arm of the university. While its origins can be traced since 1955, when it started operation under the name University of Valle Library (Spanish: Biblioteca de la Universidad del Valle), the current publisher was established under Agreement 005 of the University Council on the 29 of April 2002, and it is regulated by Agreement 006 of 2004. It is a dependency of the Vice-rectory for Research and its editorial board is comprised by the Vice-rectors for Academics and Research, five tenured Professors, and the manager of the program. The program publishes books and scientific journals, both in print and electronic media with more than 300 titles currently on print.

== Student life ==
=== Activism ===
The university has a student body deeply involved in social activism. Its origins can be traced to the early years of the university. In 1954 the first national student congress took place in Cali, where the main issues that the student movement would tackle were defined: the university's autonomy, and the freedom and democratization of education. Then, in 1957, the National Union of University Students was established. The university would become an important member of this organization, whose first significant action would take place in May of the same year that ended the dictatorship of General Gustavo Rojas Pinilla. The events started with a strike by students of the university, followed by students of private universities in Bogotá, and then by workers in the industrial, transportation, financial, and commercial sectors.

The student movement has not been free from the influence of radical groups. This influence intensified in the 1960s, during the government of Carlos Lleras Restrepo, who initiated a repressive and military approach to the university conflicts. Since then, there have been confrontations between radical groups, from inside and outside of the university, and the police, in the campus grounds and its surroundings. On some occasions this resulted in participants being injured or even killed. On April 4, 2001, during a confrontation between masked individuals and the Mobile Anti-Disturbance Squadron (Spanish: Escuadrón Móvil Antidisturbios, ESMAD), police patrolmen John Arce was killed by an explosive. This incident was followed by the incursion of the police force into the university, which left equipment, buildings, and vehicles damaged. On September 22, 2005, during a protest against the Free Trade Agreement between the United States and Colombia, the chemistry student Jhonny Silva Aranguren was killed, according to some witnesses, by the police force.

While most of the university community is against the actions of the radical movements, this has not prevented the stigmatization of the student body by the general population. This attitude has led to the belief that the guerrilla and subversive groups that operate in Colombia have clandestine operatives inside the university, a belief that has been supported by the discovery of unconventional weaponry inside the university grounds. This has resulted in the targeting of student activists by criminal and paramilitary groups. On October 4, 2006, a student of Technology of Prehospital Attention and representative at the Academic Council, Julian Andrés Hurtado, was killed by hitmen. In his honor, the Government of Valle del Cauca and the Institute for the Development of Valle del Cauca (Spanish: Instituto Financiero para el Desarrollo del Valle del Cauca, INFIVALLE) established a scholarship program that bears his name. Another situation that reflects the stigmatization of the student body is the unfounded arrests of students during the disturbances, such as those that occurred on April 3, 2008, when four students were captured without substantial evidence, and eventually released when it was demonstrated that they were not even near the confrontation site at the time of the disturbances.

=== Athletics ===
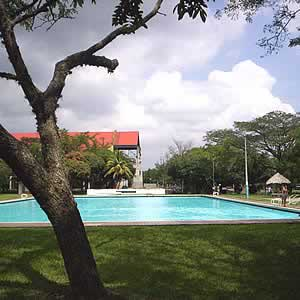
University Sports Center

The university participates in the Southwest division of the ASCUN tournament, along with other 26 institutions from the departments of Cauca, Nariño, and Valle del Cauca, with student, staff, and faculty teams. These games are qualifiers for the national tournament, which has been held every year since 1996. The university has male and female varsity teams in basketball, billiards, chess, cycling, futsal, judo, karate, rugby, soccer, swimming, taekwondo, table tennis, tennis, track and field, triathlon, beach and indoor volleyball, and weightlifting.

=== Student groups ===
The university has 53 student groups and organizations, involved in research, academic, ecological, social history, and sports activities.

== Notable people ==
In over 60 years of history, the university has held among its students, faculty, and staff, many notable people, including politicians, scientists, and artists. This includes the current governor of Nariño Antonio Navarro Wolff, and the former governor of Valle del Cauca Gustavo Álvarez Gardeazábal, who not only are alumni of the university, but at one point in time were also faculty members. The former Ministry of the Interior and Justice and ambassador of Colombia in Italy, Sabas Pretelt de la Vega, attended the university as well.

Some scientists affiliated to the university are Sócrates Herrera Valencia, head of the Immunology Research Institute of the university and creator of a synthetic vaccine against malaria; and Raúl Cuero, a researcher in biotechnology at the Texas A&M University and an employee at NASA.

The faculty of Integrated Arts is also gaining national notability. The film directors Antonio Dorado and Carlos Moreno, both alumni of the university, are part of the new generation of Colombian filmmakers. Dorado, who is also a faculty member, directed the movie The King, which was nominated for the Goya Awards. Moreno directed the movie Dog Eat Dog, which was the first Colombian movie to be shown in the Sundance Film Festival.

== See also ==
- Flag of the Department of Valle del Cauca
- List of universities in Colombia
