= Francisco José de Caldas District University =

Research university in Colombia

Coordinates: 4°37′41″N 74°03′55″W

- Universidad Distrital Francisco José de Caldas
- Other names: La Distrital
- Former names: Municipal University of Bogotá (1948-1957)
- Motto: Ubi Veritas Ibi Libertas
- Motto in English: Where there is truth there is freedom
- Type: Public
- Established: 1948
- Academic affiliations: ASCUN, AUIP, Universia
- Rector: Giovanny Tarazona Bermúdez
- Students: 26,140
- Undergraduates: 24,825
- Postgraduates: 1,315
- Location: Bogotá, Colombia
- Campus: Urban
- Colors: Red & yellow
- Website: www.udistrital.edu.co

The Universidad Distrital Francisco José de Caldas (Spanish: Universidad Distrital Francisco José de Caldas) is a public, coeducational, research university based in Bogotá, Colombia. It is the second most important public higher education institution in the city, after the National University of Colombia, with a population of 26,140 students. It was founded in 1948, by Priest Daniel de Caicedo, who would become its first rector, with the support of the Bogotá City Council, as the Municipal University of Bogotá (Spanish: Universidad Municipal de Bogotá). It changed its name to the current in 1957 when the municipality of Bogotá became a district. Its establishment was officialized by the 1970 decree No. 1030, issued by the national government. The university offers 70 programs at undergraduate and postgraduate levels, including four masters and one doctorate.

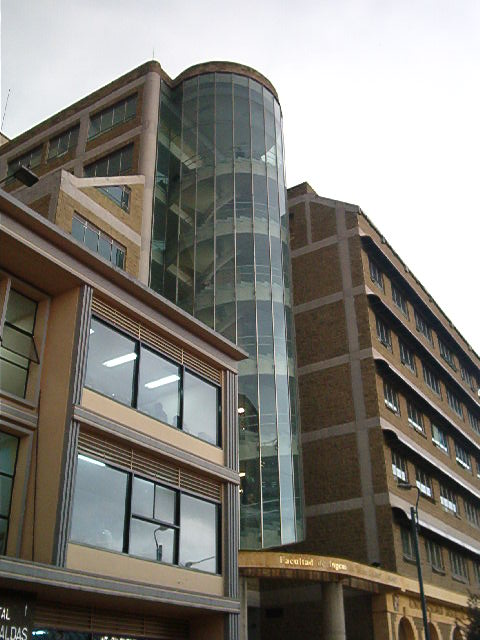
Faculty of engineering District University of Bogotá

The university is member of the Association of Colombian Universities (ASCUN), the Iberoamerican Association of Postgraduate Universities (AUIP), and the Iberoamerican University Network Universia.

== History ==
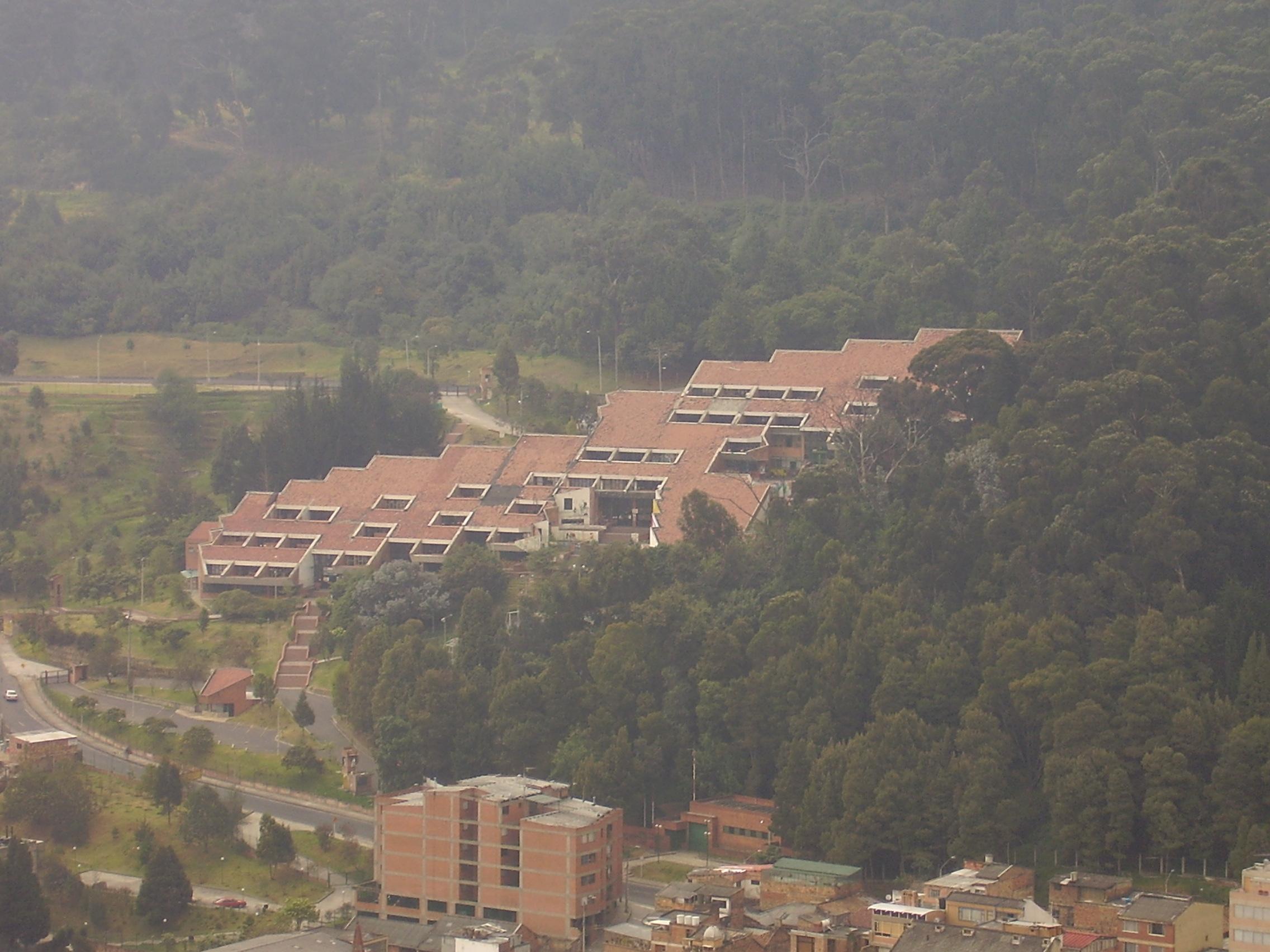
La Macarena Campus

The Francisco José de Caldas District University was founded in 1948, on initiative of the priest Daniel de Caicedo, who was its first principal. The foundation act of the "Universidad Municipal de Bogotá" (as it was originally named) stated that it was a university created by the Bogotá City Council.

The first program to be created was Radiotechnology, which in time became the Electronics Engineering program. The other program was Topography which still exists and gave birth to the Cadastral Engineering program. Another program was dedicated to the care and conservation of the environment, later named Forest Engineering.

The first university building was located where today stands the Museo de Desarrollo Urbano (Urban Development Museum) in the Calle tenth with Carrera eighth, in front of the Palacio Liévano (Liévano Palace) and the Capitolio Nacional (National Capitol).

In 1957, the city of Bogotá became the "Distrito Especial" (Special District) and the university was then named "Universidad Distrital Francisco José de Caldas" after the first Colombian scientist Francisco José de Caldas.

In the 1970s the departments of Physics and Chemistry were created. In 1979 due to political and organizational difficulties, the university was closed for two years and reopened, with a newly constructed campus, in the neighborhood La Macarena.

Between the years 1993 and 1994, the Environment and Natural Resources programs were created.

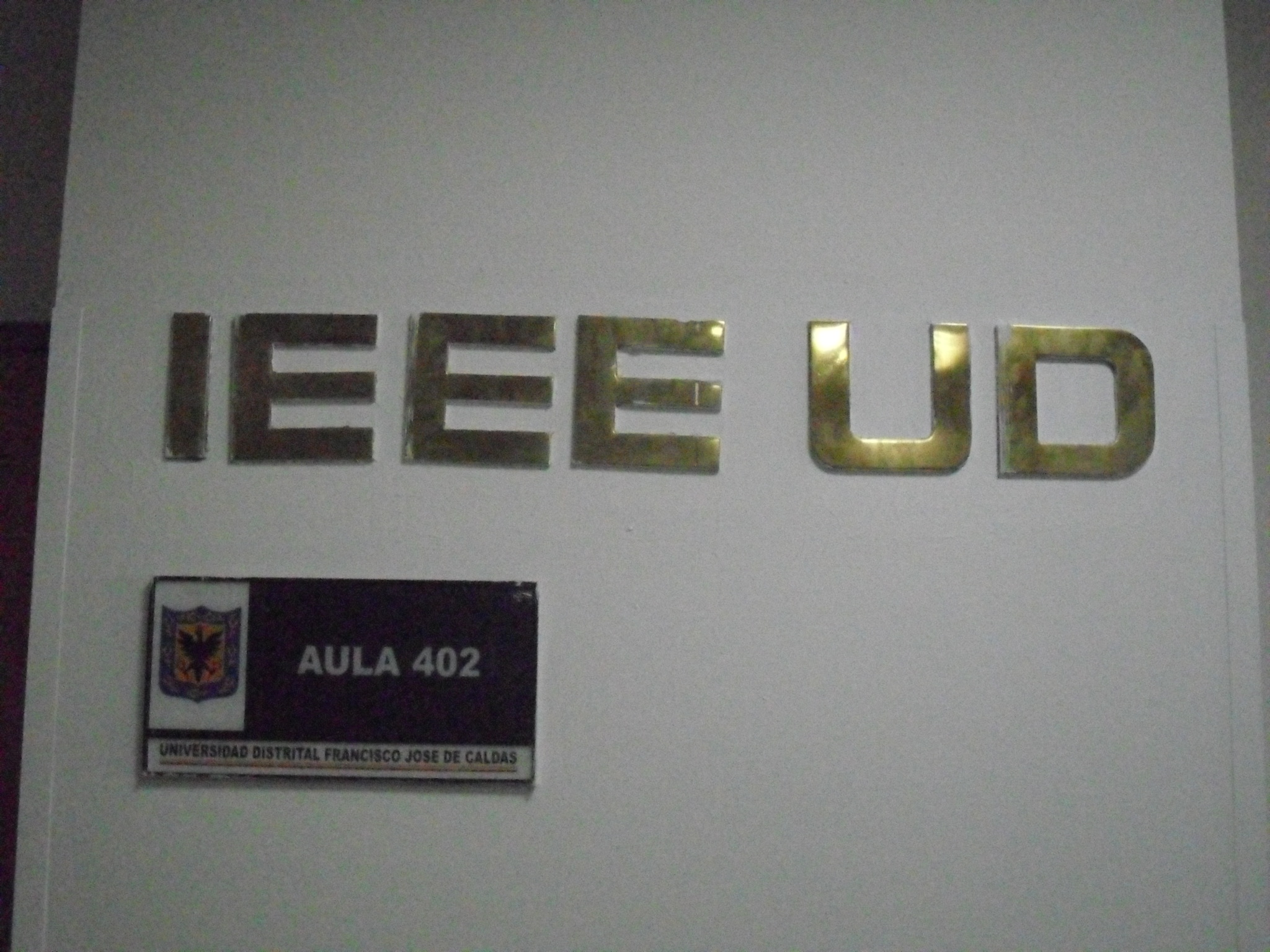
The office of IEEE

== Campus ==
It is constituted by buildings and campus around the Bogotá city

- Science and Education campus, formerly named 'La Macarena'
- Faculty of Engineering - Sabio Caldas Building
- Alejandro Suárez Copete Building
- Technological Faculty campus
- Faculty of Art - ASAB campus
- Faculty of Environment and Natural Resources campus

== Departments ==
- Faculty of Engineering
- Faculty of Science and Education
- Environment Faculty
- Faculty of Art - ASAB
- Technological Faculty
- Language Institute -ILUD
- Accreditation Committee
- Educational Study and Research Institute

== See also ==
- List of universities in Colombia
