= University of Cauca =

University in Colombia

Coordinates: 2°26′27″N 76°36′17″W

- Universidad del Cauca
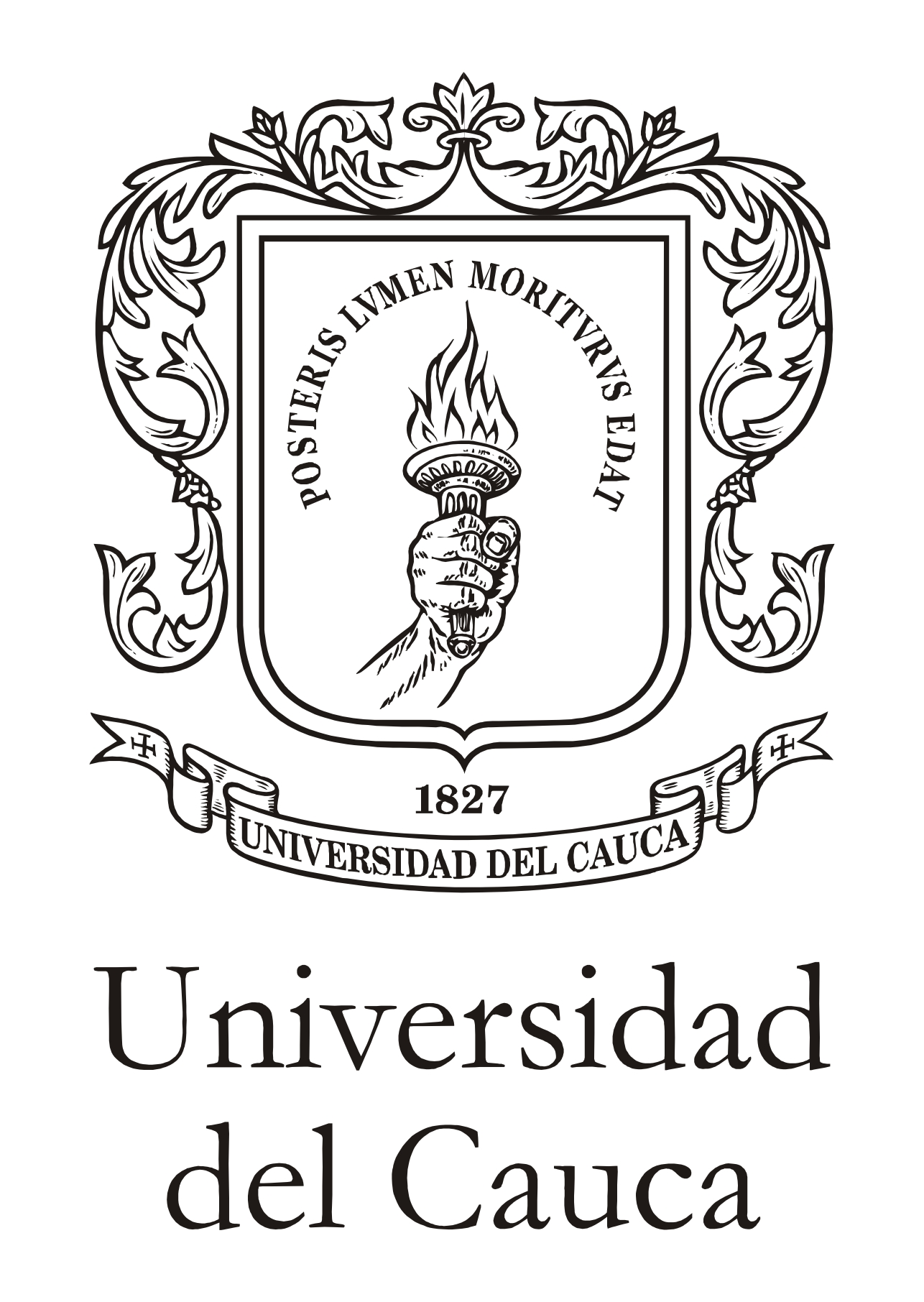
- Other name: Unicauca
- Motto: posteris lumen moriturus edat (Latin)
- Motto in English: May the dying give light to posterity
- Type: Public and autonomous
- Established: November 11, 1827; 198 years ago
- Academic affiliations: ASCUN; Colciencias; ICETEX; AUIP; Universia
- Principal: Deibar Rene Hurtado
- Academic staff: 1191 professors
- Students: 12,837
- Location: Street 5 Number. 4-70, Popayan, Popayán, Cauca, Colombia
- Campus: Tulcan (headquarters)
- Colours: Blue & red
- Website: www.unicauca.edu.co

The University of Cauca (Spanish: Universidad del Cauca) is a public research university located in the city of Popayán, capital of the department of Cauca, Colombia. It was created on April 24, 1827, by a decree by the President Francisco de Paula Santander. It was installed on November 11, 1827 and the nationalization was ratified by Law 65 of 1964. It currently has 43 undergraduate programs and 48 postgraduate programs which include 29 specializations, 14 Masters and 5 PhDs.

== History ==
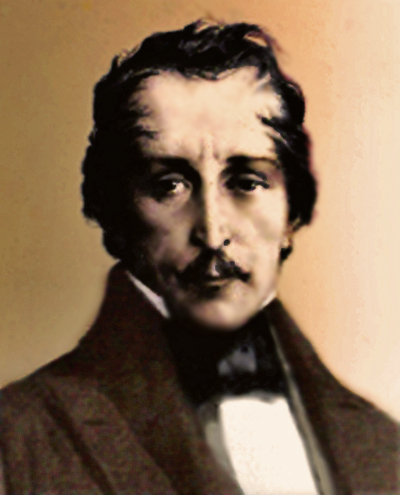
General Santander. Sketch by Helen Bedout, 1919.

The Universidad del Cauca is a public higher education institution whose head office is in the city of Popayan, capital of Cauca, in Colombia's Southwest. Founded in November 1827, from the beginning had the support of the Liberator Simon Bolivar and Francisco de Paula Santander. Several higher education decrees issued by Simon Bolivar, were made in Popayán, within the University of Cauca.

The university has its roots in the Major Seminary of Popayan, first-rate educational establishment in colonial times had wide impact where the newest ideas of philosophical, political and scientific Illustration in the 18th century on Enlightenment. There, precisely, it formed the generation that would later become the protagonist of the struggles of the Independence of the Spanish Empire with the likes of Francisco Jose de Caldas Tomás Cipriano de Mosquera and Camilo Torres, men of politics, study and state. Thinking of Republican and independent life in Colombia generated a large proportion of the Universidad del Cauca, so that the history of the independence of Colombia and its beginnings as an independent republic joins the university's history.

Like that time, the University of Cauca has remained an institution of knowledge, free forum progress and evaluating the circumstances and choices of social life, defending the democratic discourse Colombia and has incessantly energizing of the free speech and citizen participation. In the last decade has been distinguished by its dynamic research structure and has several research groups recognized by Colciencias.

Along the 20th century, the University of Cauca was founded in permanent pole attracting students from various regions of the country, mainly in southwestern Colombia. He continues as a public university attractive to young people wishing to study and prepare. However, regressive policies in public higher education of recent governments of Colombia has halted its dynamism and its self.

Seventeen graduates of the University of Cauca have held the Colombian head of state.

Its historical archive, located in the historic center of Popayan, has a valuable collection of documents of the colonial and independence aroused the interest of Historians and social scientists. It was established in 1970, based on documents of the Central Archive of Cauca, listed by José María Arboleda Llorente who since 1928 until his death in 1969 he organized and produced detailed indexes of approximately 24,000 documents. This fund is made up of the archives of the Governor of Popayan, of the Sovereign State of Cauca, the Department of Cauca and the Judicial Archives "The Ram".

== Organisation ==
The Universidad del Cauca, as a public higher education institution faithful to democratic principles, has a management structure made up of authorities of legislative and executive branches. The highest governing body and the Alma Mater government is the Supreme Council, while Dean is the first executive authority of the university. Complement the institution's management structure 4 and the Academic Council Vice-Presidency, corporation responsible for analyzing and making academic decisions.

The agencies and bodies of the University of Cauca are:

=== High Council ===
The Supreme Council is the highest organ of management and governance of the University of Cauca. Shall meet ordinarily at least 2 times a month and extraordinarily when convened by its Chairman or in his absence, by the representative of the President or the Rector. For any meeting shall be acknowledged in writing to its members.

By regulation, the Board should consist of:

- The Minister of Education or his designee, who shall preside.
- The Governor of the department of Cauca.
- One member appointed by the President of the Republic who has had ties with the university sector.
- A representative of academic policies, elected by secret ballot by the deans, graduate institute directors and department heads, among them.
- A teacher of the institution, elected by secret ballot by practicing teachers, who must be full-time partner or owner and not disciplinary or criminal sanctions.
- One graduate, who is the President of the Association of Alumni of the University of Cauca.
- A regular student of the institution, elected by secret ballot by regular students currently enrolled, who must have taken and passed at least 50% of the respective academic program, achieving in school an average of not less than 3.5 and not be liable to cancellation of registration or expulsion.
- A representative of the productive sector of the Cauca, chosen from among candidates registered by the legally constituted associations, with more than five (5) years, that are recognized nationally recognized and accredited department. The representative must have a university degree, a professional credit of at least five (5) years, being associated, affiliated or linked to the entity that represents no older than six (6) months, have no employment or contractual relationship with university, or have had during the past year have not been convicted and not penal or disciplinary sanctions.
- A former rector of the Universidad del Cauca, chosen by ex-rectors for a period of two (2) years, who has held office in property and is not penal or disciplinary sanctions.
- The Rector of the institution with voice but no vote.

=== Academic Council ===
The Academic Council is the highest academic authority of the University of Cauca. By regulation should consist of:

- The Rector of the Universidad del Cauca, who will preside
- The Academic Vice President who shall preside in the absence of the Rector
- The Administrative Vice Chancellor
- The Vice President of Culture and Welfare
- The Vice President for Research
- Faculty Deans
- A director of Graduate Institute elected by secret ballot from among them, for a period of two years.
- A teacher of the institution elected by secret ballot by practicing teachers, who shall be a partner or owner and not disciplinary or criminal sanctions
- Two regular students of the institution currently enrolled in the courses of the respective curriculum, elected by secret ballot by the regular students currently enrolled, who must have taken and passed at least 50% of the respective academic program, reaching in their studies an overall average of not less than 3.5 and not have been punished with cancellation of registration, expulsion, or criminal. "

The teacher and the student elected to the Academic Council shall have a period of two and one year respectively, counted from the date of their choice, while preserving such qualities.

As Secretary of the Academic Council shall act by the Secretary General of the Universidad del Cauca.

The rules of formation and functions of the university academic authority are clearly set out in Chapter III of the Agreement No. 105 of 1993, which is issued by the General Statutes of the University of Cauca.

=== Rectory ===
The Rectory is the first executive authority of the University of Cauca and its main head is the Rector, who is the legal representative of the institution. It consists of four units dealing with internal control and legal affairs, administration and planning of the university. It currently has five administrative staff.

=== Management vice presidency ===
The administrative vice-rector of the Universidad del Cauca is the unit responsible for directing, coordinating and supporting the various activities that require human resource management, economic, technological and infrastructure for development and implementation to achieve the function of social institutions.

=== Research Vicerrectoría ===
In 1997 the Supreme Council of the Universidad del Cauca official the presence of the Vice-Rector for Research in the organizational structure of the institution in order to consolidate and develop the Research within the university. This provision is contained in article seven of the 031 Agreement, 1997, which amended the General Statutes of the University of Cauca. The Vice-Rector for Research was established as the governing body responsible for designing, promoting and implementing research policies of the institution, with the ultimate goal of generating a positive impact on the region.

=== Vicerrectoría Culture and Welfare ===
The Vice Presidency Cultural and Welfare is the agency responsible for coordinating and supporting the various initiatives carried out at the Universidad del Cauca and are related to sport, recreation, art, cultural heritage, literature publications, the use of media and health of the university community. Consists of five agencies that work specifically in the areas mentioned above and it also depends on the imprint of the University of Cauca and university residences. The Vice Presidency is also working towards achieving Icetex credits for students who require financial funding to pursue their studies and through it are made safe procedures related to university student. Currently, the rector of Culture and Welfare is Maria Cristina Simmonds.

=== Academic vice ===
The academic vice is the agency responsible for coordinating the various processes of admission, registration, accreditation, selection and training of teachers, promotion of academic and outreach programs offered by the Universidad del Cauca. It is divided into three units working specifically in the areas mentioned above as well as by the Accreditation Office of the institution. Also, according to the organizational structure of the University of Cauca, under their supervision each of the powers are part of the Alma Mater. Currently, the Academic Vice President Alvaro Hurtado is the master's Tejada.

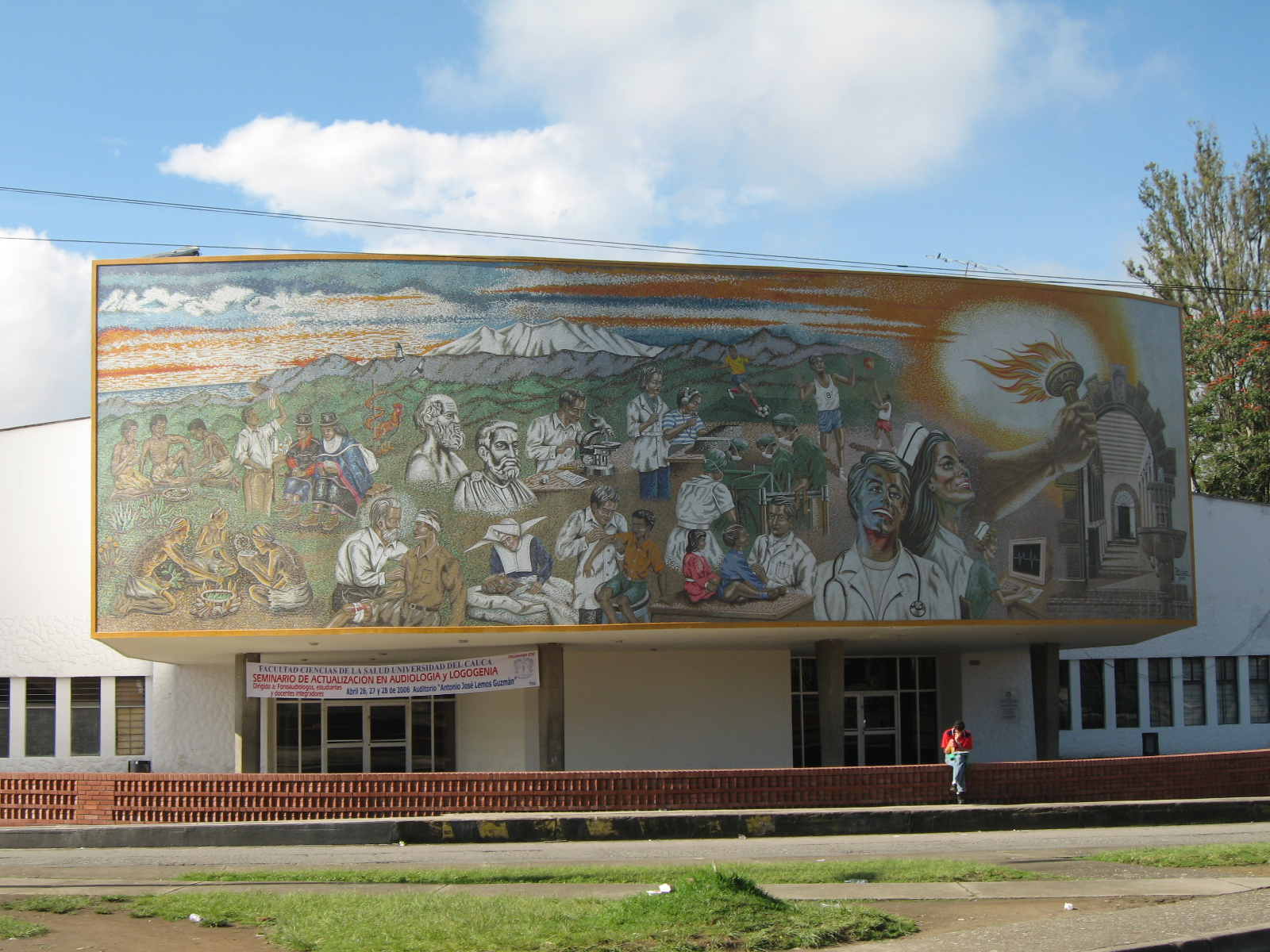
Faculty of Medical Sciences

== University programs ==
=== Undergraduate programs ===
The University of Cauca, true to its commitment of providing critical, responsible and creative higher education to the community, offers 43 undergraduate programs through various colleges. Some of these programs are offered twice a year, while others are annual. Each one of them is registered in the National System of Higher Education (SNIES), and several have obtained the qualified registration issued by the Ministry of National Education for a period of 7 years.

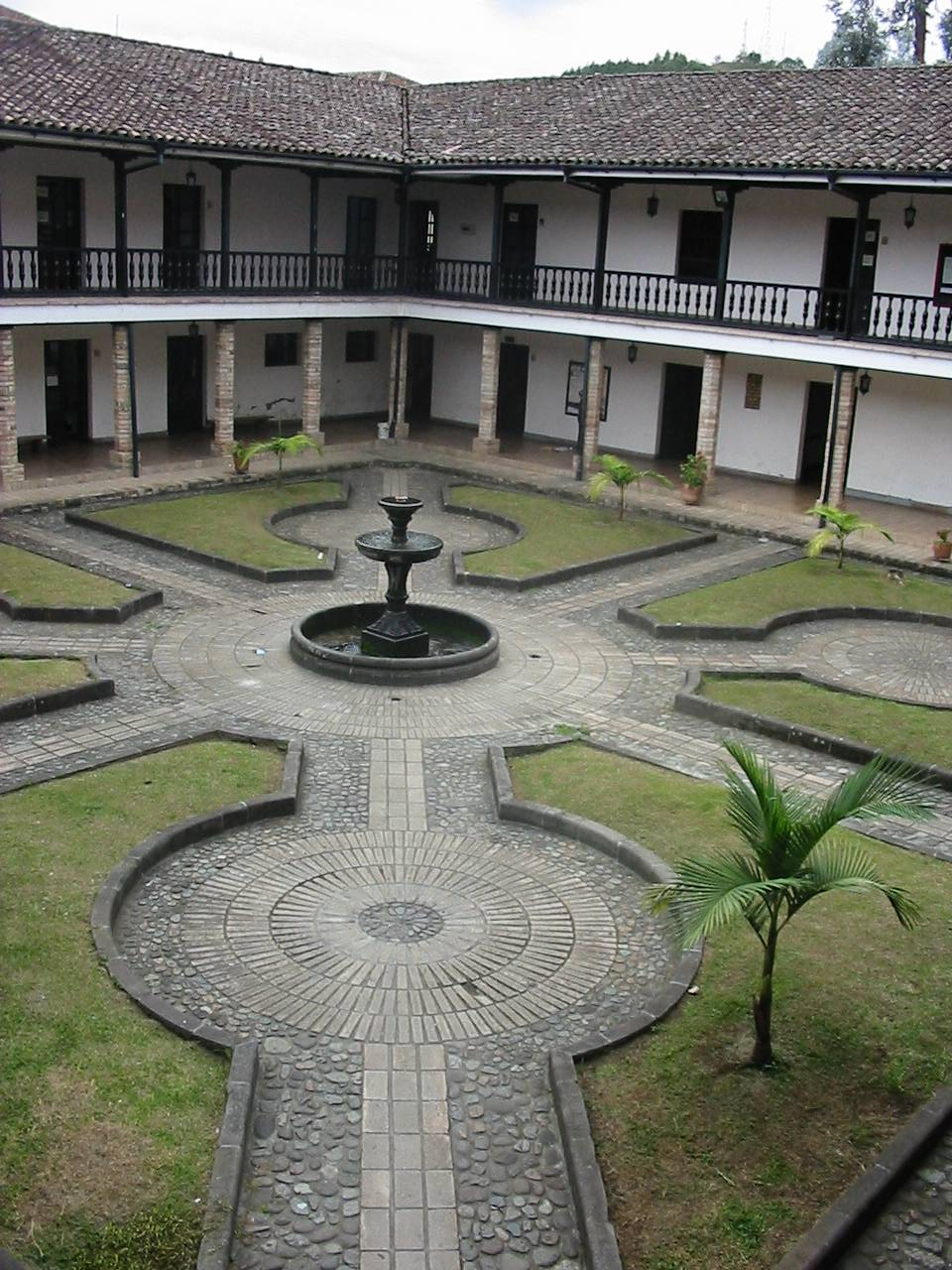
Faculty of Humanities and Social Sciences

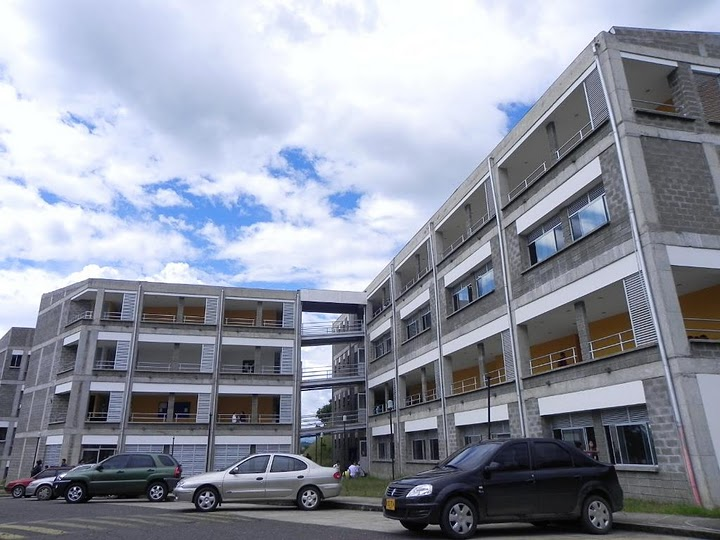
School of Accounting, Economics and Management

Programs:

- Business Administration
- Anthropology
- Visual Arts
- Biology
- Political Science
- Social Communication
- Public Accounting
- Law
- Graphic Design
- Economy
- Nursing
- Spanish Language and Literature
- Philosophy
- Physiotherapy
- Speech Therapy
- Geography
- Geotechnology
- History
- Agro-Engineering
- Agricultural Engineering
- Environmental Engineering
- Civil Engineering
- Electronics and Telecommunications Engineering
- Forestry
- Engineering Physics
- Systems Engineering
- Industrial Automation Engineering
- Modern Languages
- Degree in Elementary Education with Emphasis in Natural Sciences and Environmental Education
- Degree in Elementary Education with Emphasis in Art Education
- Degree in Elementary Education with Emphasis in Physical Education, Sport and Recreation
- Degree in Elementary Education with Emphasis in Spanish and English Languages
- Degree in Ethnic Education
- Degree in Mathematics
- Bachelor of Music
- Instrumental Music
- Math
- Medicine
- Chemistry
- Agro-Technology
- Technology in Financial Management
- Telematics Technology
- Tourism

=== Graduate programs ===
The University of Cauca, true to its commitment of providing critical, responsible and creative community higher education, offers a total of 48 graduate programs, of which 29 are majors, 14 are masters and 5 doctoral programs. Each is registered with the National Higher Education Information (SNIES) and several have obtained the qualified registration issued by the Ministry of Education. The admissions process for accessing these programs is coordinated directly by the Graduate Institute of alma mater.

Graduate programs offered by the University of Cauca are:

Specializations:

- Hospital Administration
- Pathology
- Anesthesiology
- Audit and Quality Assurance Health with emphasis in Epidemiology
- General Surgery
- Public Accounting
- Administrative Law
- Development of Software Solutions
- Education
- Sports Training
- Structures
- Intercultural Studies
- Revenue Management
- International Business Management
- Project Management
- Gynecology and Obstetrics
- Traffic Engineering
- Engineering of roads
- Construction Engineering
- Applied Mathematics with emphasis in Computational Mathematics
- Family Medicine
- Internal Medicine
- Corporate Marketing
- Pavements
- Pediatrics
- Network and Telematic Services
- Tax Auditing and International Auditing
- Radio Systems
- Telematics

Master's:

- Anthropology
- Automatic
- Mathematical Sciences
- Computer
- Education
- Development Interdisciplinary Studies
- Ethics and Political Philosophy
- Electronics and Telecommunications
- History
- Engineering Physics
- Telematics Engineering
- Engineering of roads
- Continental Hydrobiological Resources
- Traffic and Transportation

Ph.D.

- Anthropology
- Environmental Sciences
- Science Education
- Electronic Sciences
- Telematics Engineering

== University campuses ==
The University of Cauca currently has 9 faculties in which it provides undergraduate and graduate training in different areas of knowledge.

These academic units are located in different parts of the city of Popayán. The first Faculty was created in the institution of law, which operates in the cloister of Santo Domingo, and the last was the Faculty of Agricultural Sciences, headquartered in the village the capital of Cauca Guacas.

The faculties of the University of Cauca are:

- Faculty of Electrical Engineering and Telecommunications - FIET
- Faculty of Civil Engineering - FIC
- Faculty of Health Sciences
- Faculty of Law and Social Policy
- Faculty of Natural Sciences, Exact and Education
- Faculty of Human Sciences
- Faculty of Arts
- Faculty of Agricultural Sciences
- School of Accounting, Economics and Management
- Centre for Open and Distance Education

=== Graduate institutes ===
- Institute of Graduate Studies, Faculty of Electrical Engineering and Telecommunications
- Graduate Institute of Civil Engineering Faculty
- Graduate Institute School of Accounting, Economics and Management
- Institute of Graduate Studies, Faculty of Humanities and Social Sciences
- Institute of Graduate Studies, Faculty of Natural Sciences, Exact and Education
- Institute of Graduate Studies, Faculty of Law, Political and Social Science
- Institute of Graduate Studies, Faculty of Health Sciences

=== Libraries ===
==== Central Library Jose Maria Serrano ====
The Library of the Universidad del Cauca is organized from the Decree of October 6, 1827 given by the President Liberator, which allocates goods and capital to the university, by this decree the collections of the extinct convents of San Francisco and Santo Domingo (works mostly philosophical and religious), but the pamphlets and books published in the press acquired by the university and the allocation of $500 annually for the purchase of scientific, are the basis of their conformation. Its first librarian was Mr. Jose Manuel Mosquera. It consists of a three-story building, with capacity to meet its 3600 mts to 280 users. This library serves the faculties of: Natural Sciences, Exact and Education, Civil Engineering, Electronics and Telecommunications Engineering and graduate of the options listed. The first floor of the building is occupied by collections: general, booking and referral, technical processes and reading rooms on the second floor you will find the archive (publiciones journals), theses, maps, sheet microfiche readers and printers.

==== Library The Carmen ====
Works on the building in 1729 founded the Marquesa de San Miguel de la Vega, Ms. Denise Perez Manrique and Camberos and which, during its existence was based in the monastery of "Carmen" at the Institute of St. Therese Reformed, School Normal for Boys of the Marist Brothers, the Police Unit and Women's College Franciscan sisters who occupied it from 1952 until 1983, after the earthquake that hit the city, acquired the Universidad del Cauca, where the Library placed Socio-Humanistic all collections of Anthropology, Philosophy, Arts, Music, Literature, History, Geography, Economics, Politics and Administration and Accounting. The library area is 2075 square meters for up to 176 users, on the first floor are the general collections, reserve and reference and the second, periodicals (journals), theses and old collections (books before 1900 ).

==== Health Sciences Library ====
Located on the first floor of the Faculty of Health Sciences, serves undergraduate programs in Medicine, Nursing, Physiotherapy, Speech and respective postgraduates. It has 624 square meters in its capacity to accommodate 128 users, and features books, journals, theses, reference databases on CD ROM, microfiche and slides.

==== Library of Agricultural Sciences ====
It is located in the Faculty of Agricultural Sciences, in the area known as "The Guacas". Here are the texts and journals alluding to the Agricultural and Livestock Sciences, serves Agroindustrial Engineering programs and Animal Husbandry.

==== Arts Library ====
On the second floor by the main entrance is located music library which provides journals, books, theses, music scores, records, cassettes, videos, films, laser video, slides and audience for the presentation of conferences, hearings, movies and videos.

=== Museums ===
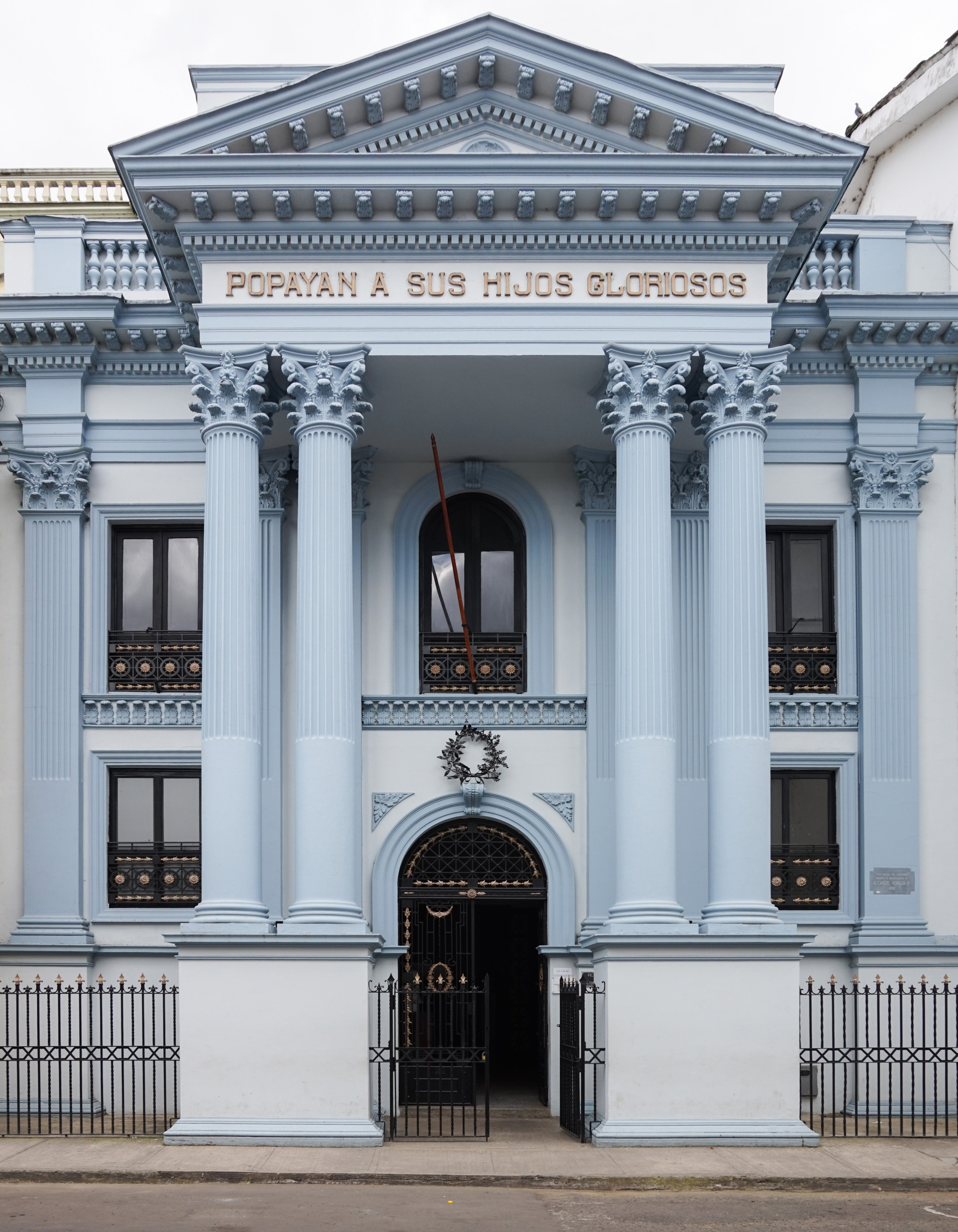
Pantheon of Heroes

- House Museum Mosquera. The Editorial of University works there
- Museum of Natural History
- Pantheon of Heroes
- House Caldas (Vice-Rector for Culture and Welfare)
- Casa José María Arboleda Llorente

=== Sports and sports facilities ===
Currently, the University of Cauca has one of the best sports facilities in Popayan, where services are provided free of charge directed at all members of the university community to develop playful activities, recreational and sports.

The University Sports Centre (CDU) is located in the area and has Tulcán soccer field, running track, volleyball, tennis pilifuncionales, skating rink, dojo for martial arts practice, Olympic swimming pools (swimming and diving), chess room, gym and a Coliseum where you can practice different disciplines. Additionally, the University of Cauca offers the possibility that members of the university community to register different kinds of programs and recreational sports.

Both the CDU management as the coordination of programs, plans, projects and actions related to this area are in charge of the Division of Sport and Recreation, an agency attached to the Vice Presidency Cultural and Welfare Unicauca.

=== Other university facilities ===
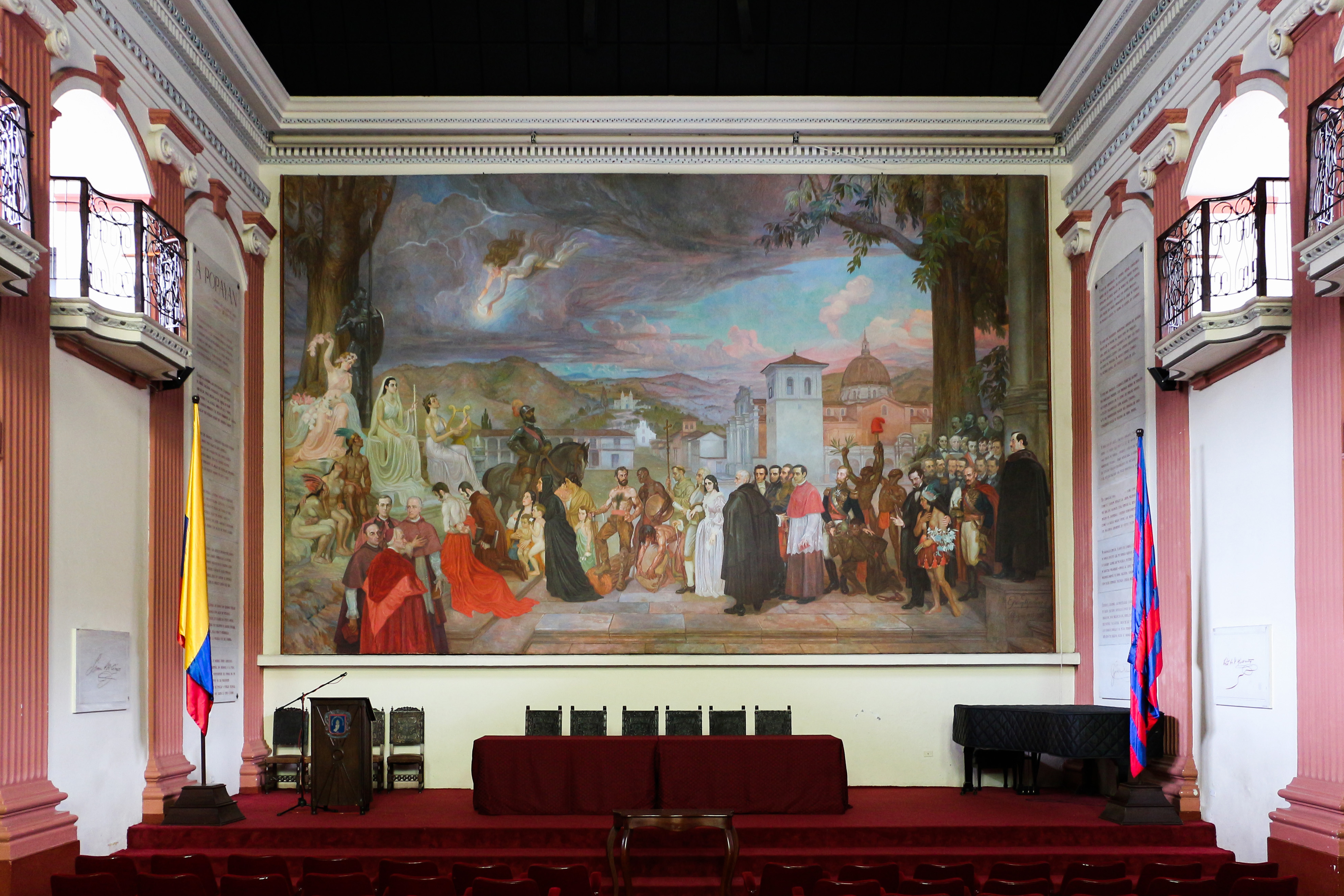
The auditorium Caldas

- Campus Tulcán
- Santo Domingo Cloister
- Building Carmen
- The auditorium Caldas
- Central Library Unicauca
- Research Vicerrectoría Universidad del Cauca
- Station of the University of Cauca 104.1 FM
- University Health Center "Alfonso Lopez"
- University Sports Centre - CDU
- Casa Rosada (Graduate Studies Building)
- Health Unit
- Residence Halls (Male and Female)
- Editorial Universidad del Cauca

=== Branches in the Department of Cauca ===
True to its vital and permanent commitment to social development through critical, responsible and creative education, the University of Cauca has been working on a process of regionalization to provide and encourage higher education in other localities. The body responsible for complying with this university decentralization policy is the regionalization of the Center for Open and Distance Education (CREAD), whose headquarters are located in the building of the School of Accounting, Economics and Management.

Through this centre, Unicauca currently provides Agribusiness Technology Program in the municipalities of Santander de Quilichao, Guapi, Miranda, Bolivar and Piendamó (Tuni).

This same program and in Telematics Technology are also offered through the CREAD in Popayan, but are aimed specifically at rural high school of the municipality and the Cauca.

== College media ==
=== Television Unicauca ===
The University of Cauca, through the Division of Communications, currently produces three television programs that are transmitted by the Municipal Channel and Canal Popayán University of Colombia Zoom. These programs address cultural, academic, research, scientific, news, etc., which are of interest to the university community and citizenship in general. The television programs produced at the time the University of Cauca are:

==== Outlook ====
Outlook is a talk show by the producer of television Unicauca Communications Division, through which the institution seeks to discuss issues of regional, national and international levels. To this end, each issue of the program with the participation of special guests who propound each of the topics covered.

In this way, Perspectives aims to provide a space for citizens to reflect and form a critical opinion about the context that surrounds it.

- Gender: Opinion and debate.
- Audience: general public.
- Broadcast: weekly.
- Duration: 25 minutes.

==== Univerciudad ====
Univerciudad magazine is a documentary produced by the Communications Division Unicauca from fresh and lively perspective of the university bodies, especially young students. Communicative intention is to enable the viewer to see and analyze the socio-cultural phenomena and problems of the city.

- Genre: documentary magazine.
- Audience: young audiences.
- Broadcast: weekly.
- Duration: 25 minutes.

==== Unicauca News ====
- Genre: Informational.
- Audience: general public.
- Issue: three times a week.
- Duration: 25 minutes.

==== Stereo Unicauca ====
Unicauca Stereo (HJC20 104.1 FM) is a means of radio communication at the University of Cauca, governed by the constitutional and legal principles of the Republic of Colombia. As public interest station, according to Decree 1446 of 1995, its programming aimed primarily at raising the educational and cultural level of the inhabitants of the region of influence, promote and disseminate human values, civic education and public debate. Unicauca Stereo broadcasts 24 hours a day from Monday to Sunday, 10 of which are for live shows. The rest of the programming is prerecorded.

The letter is distributed programming and musical bands or review content aimed at different audiences, such as: family, children, youth, adults, specialized university community and the community in general. The administration, coordination of activities and implementation of content presented at the station in charge of the Division of Communications, an agency attached to the Vice Presidency Cultural and Welfare Unicauca.

=== Newspapers and magazines ===
The University of Cauca has several periodical publications that are produced by the various departments, academic units and research groups of the institution. These print media account for the academic, research and outreach performed in the university, and many include specialized content about the various areas of knowledge. Several of these publications are available in print, others are available only through the Internet, while some have versions in both formats.

Newspapers and magazines that are part of the University of Cauca are:

==== Newspapers current ====
- Newspaper University Today

U & C * Newspaper (print only)

==== Científcas with academic journals and digital version ====
- Biotechnology in Agriculture and Agribusiness Sector
- Bulletin VRI (Vice-Rector for Research)
- Consent
- Jared
- Engineering Today
- News Colombian
- Journal of Health Sciences
- Rutic

==== Academic and scientific journals with PDF version ====
- Bulletin Mosquera House Museum
- North Magazine (home of Santander de Quilichao)
- Utopia Magazine

=== Academic and scientific journals printed ===
- Traveling Magazine (Doctor of Science in Education)
- Magazine of the Faculty of Humanities and Social Sciences
- Magazine of the Faculty of Law, Political and Social Science
- Computer Link Magazine
- Revista de la Facultad Ciencias de la Salud

== Notable people ==
Seventeen graduates of the University of Cauca have held the head of the Colombian government.

- Froilán Largacha lawyer, politician and president of Colombia
- Julián Trujillo Largacha statesman, lawyer, politician, military and President of Colombia
- Manuel Antonio Sanclemente statesman, educator, lawyer and president of Colombia
- Ezequiel Hurtado political, military, Statesman and President of Colombia
- Diego Euclides de Angulo Lemos politician and president of Colombia
- Victor Mosquera Chaux lawyer, politician and president of Colombia
- Julio Arboleda Pombo lawyer, orator, poet, military, journalist, politician, diplomat, parliamentarian, scholar, playwright and Colombian statesman, elected President of the Confederation of Granada (present republics of Colombia and Panama)
- Guillermo León Valencia lawyer, politician, an honorary doctorate in 1956 and president of Colombia
- Carlos Lemos Simmonds lawyer, political writer, journalist and president of Colombia
- Aurelio Iragorri Civil engineer, politician and Senator of Colombia
- Jose Maria Quijano Wallis lawyer, diplomatic, politician, Senator of Colombia, intellectual, historian and Vice Chancellor of the University of Cauca
- Jesus Ignacio García lawyer, politician and Senator of Colombia
- Josefina Valencia de Hubach Colombia's political and diplomatic
- Emerald Grove lawyer, feminist and diplomatic policy in Colombia
- Manuel Maria Mosquera Arboleda political, intellectual and Colombian diplomat and president of the University of Cauca.
- Gustavo Arboleda historian, journalist and Colombian diplomat
- Luis Fernando Velasco lawyer, politician and Senator of Colombia
- Antonio Garcia Nossa economist, historian, writer and socialist politician in Colombia.
- José Darío Salazar lawyer, politician and Senator of Colombia
- Isaias Muñoz Acosta lawyer, politician, political writer, journalist, Congressman of Colombia and rector of the Universidad del Cauca
- Aurelio Caicedo Ayerbe lawyer, politician and diplomat Colombia
- Ruben Varon Colombian poet and writer specializing in crime fiction and detective
- Francisco Jose Urrutia Olano Colombian diplomat and international lawyer
- Cesar Uribe novelist, physician and rector of the University of Cauca
- Baldomero Sanin Cano humanist, journalist, essayist, and rector of the University of Cauca
- Francisco Eduardo Diago musician and lawyer
- Antonio Jose Lemos Guzman physician and historian
- José María Arboleda Llorente historian
- Manuel Antonio Arboleda Arboleda lawyer, politician and intellectual
- Antonio García Nossa economist, historian, political writer and Colombian socialist
- Guillermo Alberto Gonzalez Mosquera Civil engineer, politician and served as rector of the Universidad del Cauca
- Sergio Arboleda journalist, lawyer and politician
- Manuel José Mosquera clergyman, lawyer, Catholic bishop and Vice Chancellor of the University of Cauca
- Joaquin Mosquera jurist, military, statesman, politician, president of the University of Cauca, Colombia President
- Maximiliano Crespo Rivera Colombian bishop and rector of the Universidad del Cauca

== See also ==
- Higher education in Colombia
- Cauca Department
- List of universities in Colombia
- List of colonial universities in Latin America
