= University of Applied and Environmental Sciences =

Private university in Bogotá, Colombia

Coordinates: 4°48′03″N 74°03′02″W

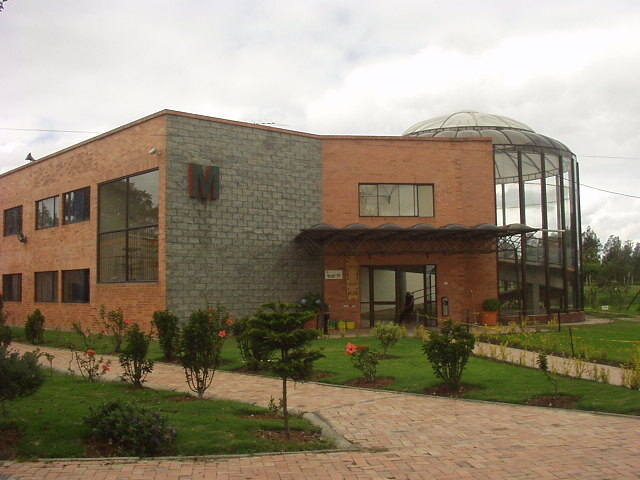
- University of Applied and Environmental Science Campus
- Established: 1983
- Affiliations: Universia, ASCUN, AUIP
- Rector: German Anzola Montero
- Students: 4600
- Postgraduates: 300
- Location: Bogotá, Colombia
- Website: www.udca.edu.co

The University of Applied and Environmental Sciences (UDCA) is a private university located in Bogotá, Colombia.

It has three campuses:

- the university campus located at Calle 222 No. 55-37, Bogota
- the schools of Economics, Management, and Finance, located in the Teusaquillo locality
- the North Headquarters, located on Calle 72 in the Chapinero locality.

== History ==
The institution was founded in 1978 as the Corporation School of Veterinary Medicine. In 1983, the name was changed to the University of Agricultural Sciences Corporation (CUDCA). In 1992, the Agricultural Engineering program was started, and in the following year the Sport Sciences program. In 1994, The Marketing Sciences program changed its name to Commercial Engineering. In 1995, the university again changed its name to "The University of Applied and Environmental Sciences Corporation", (UDCA). New programs were introduced in veterinary medicine, animal science and geographic engineering specializations.

In 2004, the corporation received recognition as a university. In 2005, it adopted the name of The University of Applied and Environmental Sciences (also UDCA). Today, the university also features The School of Economics, Management and Finance (EEAF), Business Administration, Accounting, and Marketing and Finances.

== Principles ==
- UDCA is an autonomous university providing a public service.
- suitably-qualified students are accepted regardless of race, creed, sex, social status, or political/economic views.
- UDCA supports socio-cultural values and sustainable human development, with respect for human rights, peace and democracy.
- it orients students towards improving the quality of life of communities at the regional, local and national levels, creating conscious and responsible citizens
- it aims to strengthen culture and regional identity, use national resources wisely, and preserve the environment for future generations.

== Academic programs ==
The university offers a variety of academic studies.

- Medicine
- Nursing
- Veterinary Medicine
- Agricultural Engineering
- Commercial Engineering
- Geographic and Environmental Engineering
- Sports Science
- Environmental Sciences
- Animal Husbandry
- Chemistry
- Pharmaceutical Chemistry
- Economics, Management, and Finance
- Business Administration
- International Business
- Public Accounting
- Marketing
