= University of Antioquia =

Public university in Medellín, Colombia

- Universidad de Antioquia
- Seal of the University of Antioquia
- Other name: UdeA
- Former name: Franciscan College
- Motto: Alma Máter de la Raza
- Motto in English: The Alma Mater of the Race
- Type: Public
- Established: 1803; 223 years ago
- Academic affiliations: ASCUN, AUIP, Universia
- Rector: John Jairo Arboleda Céspedes
- Academic staff: 1,386 FTE
- Administrative staff: 1,589
- Students: 30,844
- Undergraduates: 29,175
- Postgraduates: 1,669
- Location: Medellín, Antioquia, Colombia; 6.2674°N 75.5684°W
- Campus: Urban
- Colours: White and green
- Website: www.udea.edu.co

The University of Antioquia (Spanish: Universidad de Antioquia), also called UdeA, is primarily a public research-based university, located in the city of Medellín, Colombia. With regional campuses in Amalfi, Andes, Caucasia, Carmen de Viboral, Envigado, Puerto Berrío, Santa Fe de Antioquia, Segovia, Sonsón, Turbo and Yarumal, it remains one of the oldest university in the region. As of 2024, we can read on their publication site that, more than 272 groups and over 5,000 faculty students, are working on 1,200 collaborative projects. Founded in 1803 after a Royal Decree was issued by King Charles IV of Spain, under the name Franciscan College (Spanish: Colegio de Franciscanos), they have maintained their accreditation from the Ministry of Education for more than 2 centuries.. Along with the University of the Andes, each institution hold the second longest term behind the National University of Colombia. UdeA and the Tecnológico de Antioquia have the largest number of seats in the department of Antioquia.

The university is a member of the Association of Colombian Universities (ASCUN), the Iberoamerican Association of Postgraduate Universities (AUIP), and the network Universia.

== History ==
=== Founding ===
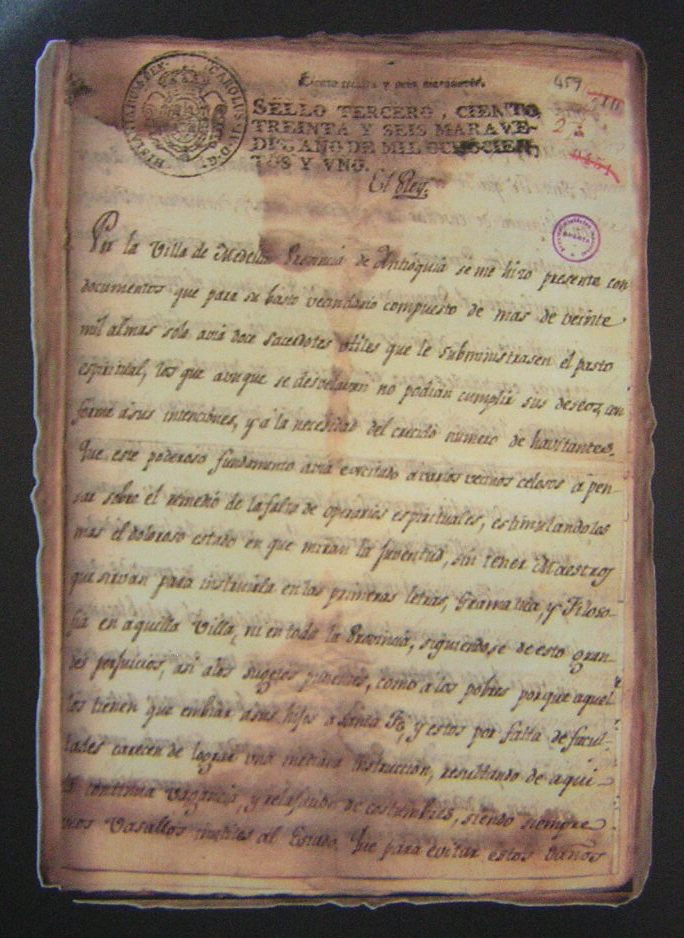
Royal Decree of February 9, 1801

The University of Antioquia was preceded by the Franciscan College (Spanish: Colegio de Franciscanos), which was founded in 1803 after King Charles IV of Spain issued the Royal Decree of February 9, 1801, allowing the establishment of a college-convent in Villa de la Candelaria, Medellín.

The first classes were held in March 1803, programs for Latin and philosophy were available for higher education. On June 20, 1803, the council of Medellín bought land for the main building and construction started in August. The structure is known as the San Ignacio building (Spanish: Edificio San Ignacio)

In 1822, once independence from Spain was consolidated, the Vice President of the Republic of Colombia Francisco de Paula Santander promoted the establishment of a new educational plan for the institution and, five years later, president Simón Bolívar allowed instruction in law.

During a great part of the 19th century, the country faced political and armed struggles and the university was closed and occupied by belligerents impeding the institution's development.

=== 20th century ===
Once the Thousand Days' War was over, the country experienced stability and the university grew. In the first thirty years the university reorganized its curriculum, redesigned some of the buildings, acquired bibliographic material and employed renowned professors.

University City (Spanish: Ciudad Universitaria) was built in the 1960s with debt and international aid. This allowed the increase in the numbers of both students and professors and the creation of new faculties and academic programs.

In the late 20th century, as part of its regionalization program, the university opened campuses and facilities in several regions of the department of Antioquia and established the University Research Headquarters.

=== Today ===
UdeA started in the mid-1990s a regionalization program to offer higher education in other municipalities within the department of Antioquia, reaching 11 regional campuses outside of Medellín.

In 2004 the university established the University Research Headquarters (Spanish: Sede de Investigación Universitaria (SIU)) an advanced project to promote a qualitative and quantitative transformation of its research system.

== Campus ==
Model of the Antioquia University

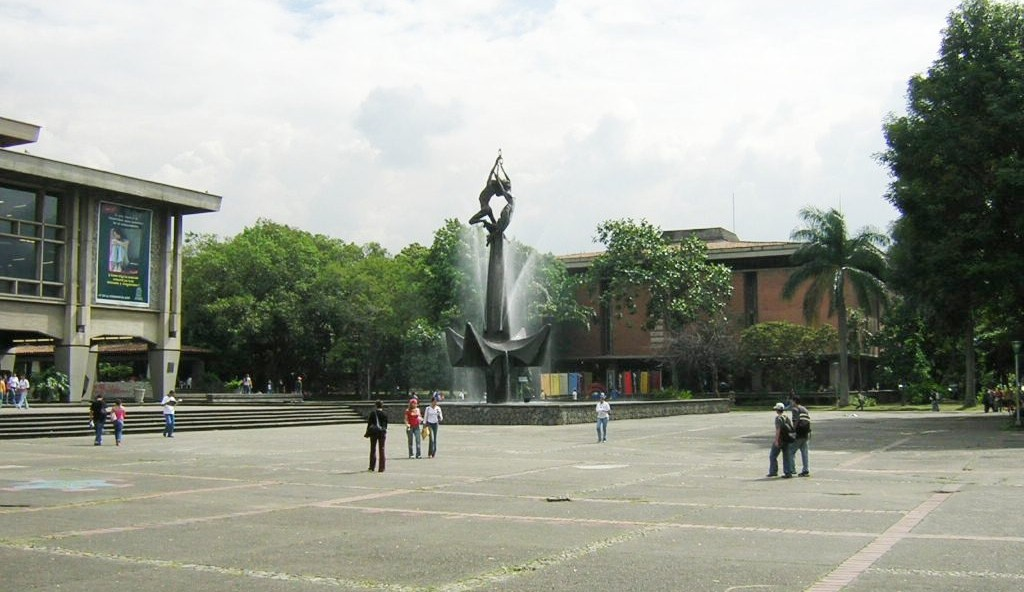
Central Square

=== Medellin ===
The university spreads across Medellín, while University City is the main campus. The other Medellín campuses are the Citadel Robledo and the Health Area. The San Ignacio Building is located in the downtown area. Eleven regional campuses are located outside the city.

==== University City ====
Built in the 1960s with an area of 23.75 hectares (58.7 acres), University City is the main campus of the university. The campus contains eight faculties, three schools, three institutes and the Administrative Building (Spanish: Edificio Administrativo). It hosts the University Museum (Spanish: Museo Universitario), the University Theater(Spanish: Teatro Universitario), the Central Library (Spanish: Biblioteca Central) and the Sport Unit (Spanish: Unidad Deportiva).

The main campus area is secured at each entrance and offers open access to any visitors by registering their names at either front office. Researchers, journalists, or higher education enthusiasts can visit the wide campus and enjoy many of the available historical and artistic relics on site.

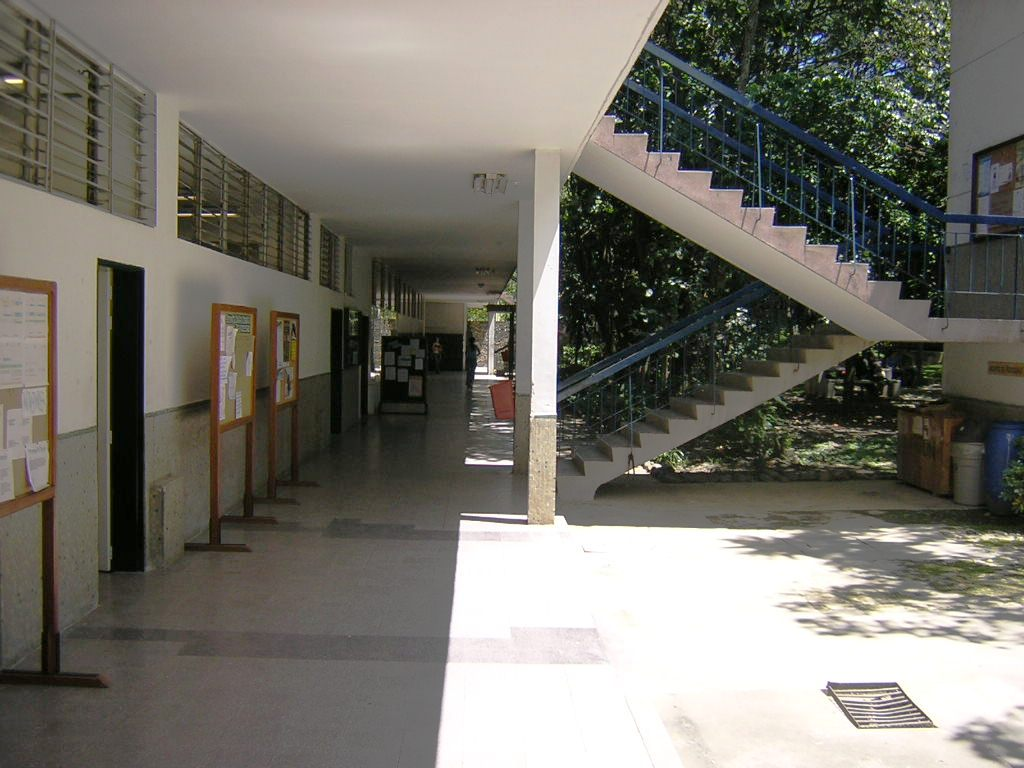
Institute of Nutrition, Citadel Robledo

==== Citadel Robledo ====
With an area of 89 hectares (220 acres), Citadel Robledo hosts the Faculty of Agricultural Sciences, the School of Nutrition, Veterinary Clinic and the Institute of Physical Education. The campus library is widely known for its collections in veterinary medicine and zootechnics.

It also contains a sport unit with two football pitches, a pool, two basketball/futsal courts and a handball court.

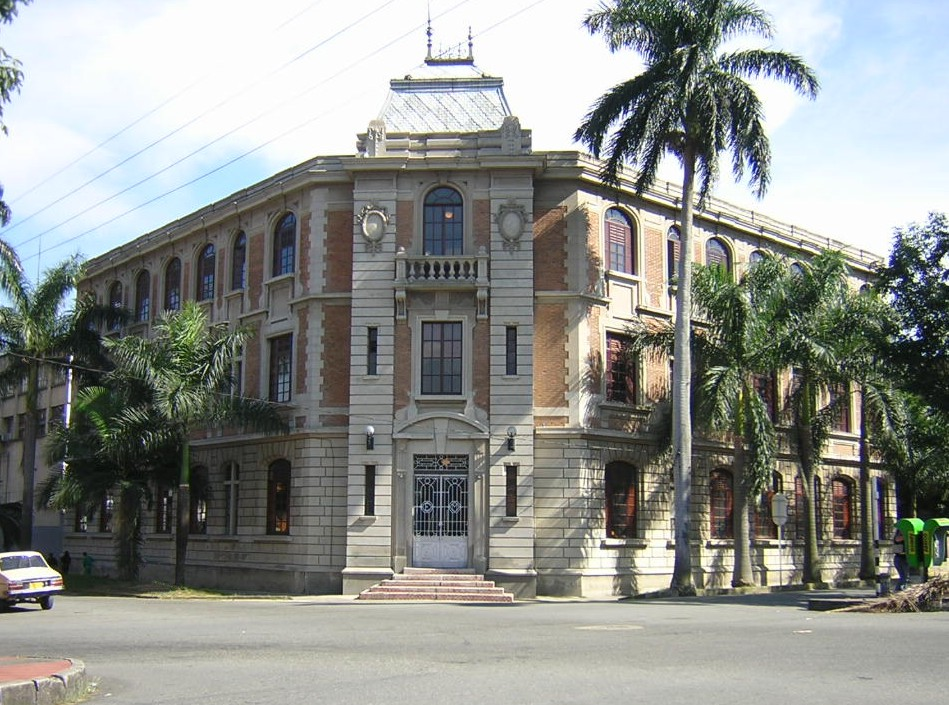
Faculty of Medicine, Health Area

==== Health area ====
This area hosts the nursing, dentistry, medicine and public health faculties, near the St Vincent de Paul University Hospital (Spanish: Hospital Universitario San Vicente de Paúl).

==== San Ignacio Building ====
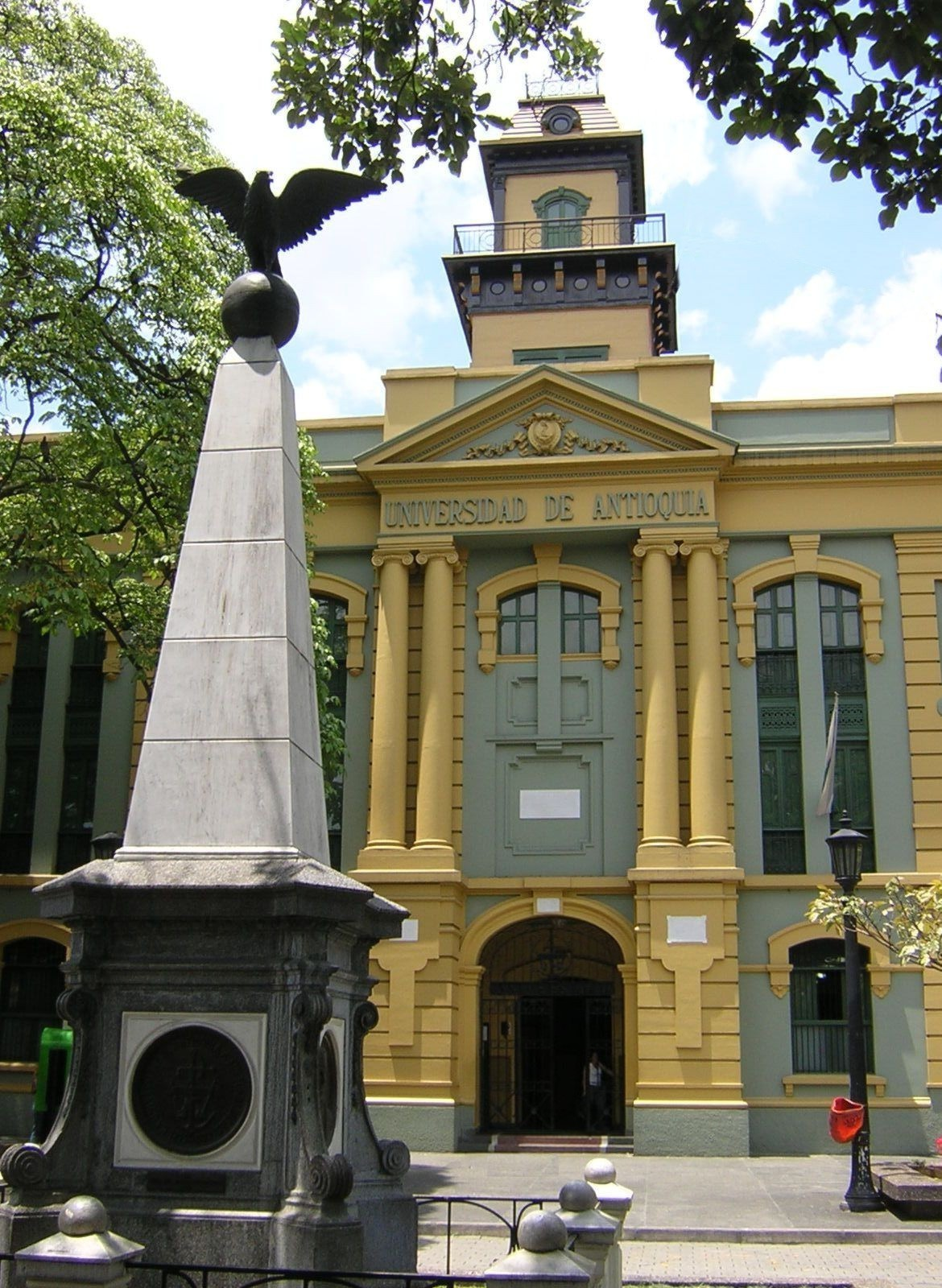
San Ignacio Building

The historical campus of the university was declared a national monument in 1982. It hosts seven exhibition halls, ten lecture rooms, one movie theater, two computer labs, one restaurant, one multipurpose room and one auditorium.

=== Regional campuses ===
In the 1990s the university started a regionalization plan to increase access to higher education across the department. The university opened campuses in Amalfi, Andes, Caucasia, Carmen de Viboral, Envigado, Puerto Berrío, Santa Fe de Antioquia, Segovia, Sonsón, Turbo and Yarumal, covering all of the subregions of Antioquia.

In 2011, the Ministry of Education gave UdeA the award for the best regionalization experience in higher education.

Subregion	Campus
Valle de Aburrá	Medellín and Envigado
Bajo Cauca	Caucasia
Magdalena Medio	Puerto Berrío
Northeastern Antioquia	Amalfi and Segovia
Northern Antioquia	Yarumal
Western Antioquia	Santa Fe de Antioquia
Eastern Antioquia	Carmen de Viboral and Sonsón
Southwestern Antioquia	Andes
Urabá	Turbo

== Governance ==
The Superior University Council (Spanish: Consejo Superior Universitario) is the university's governing body. It is formed by the Governor of Antioquia who is the president of the SUC, the Minister of Education or his delegate, a representative of the President of Colombia, a dean elected as the representative of the Academic Council, a representative of the professors, a representative of the students, an alumnus, a representative of the industry, an ex-rector of the university and the rector (non-voting).

The Academic Council (Spanish: Consejo Académico) is the highest academic body of the university. It is formed by the rector, who is the president of the AC; vice-rectors of Investigation, Teaching, Extension and Administration; deans of each faculty; a representative of the professors and a student representative.

The rector is the legal representative and top executive of the university. He is responsible for academic and administrative management. He is not permitted to take another job in the private or public sector. He takes office before the President of the Superior University Council.

== Academics ==
The university has 25 academic divisions at its flagship campus:

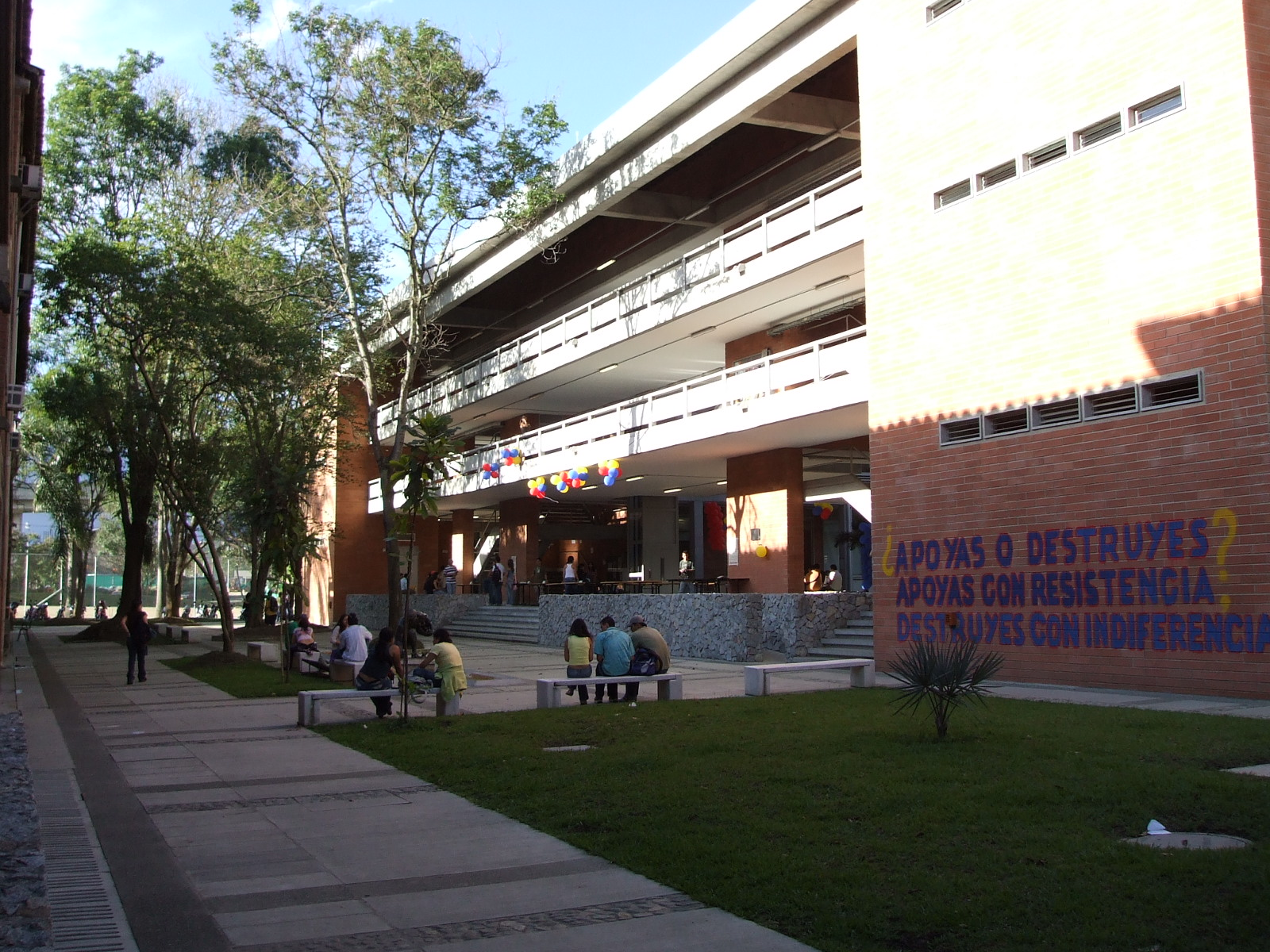
The Faculty of Engineering is the largest faculty by enrollment

Academic divisions of the University of Antioquia

Faculties

- Faculty of Arts
- Faculty of Agricultural Sciences
- Faculty of Economics
- Faculty of Exact and Natural Sciences
- Faculty of Communications and Philology
- Faculty of Law and Political Sciences
- Faculty of Education
- Faculty of Nursing
- Faculty of Engineering
- Faculty of Medicine
- Faculty of Dentistry
- Faculty of Pharmaceutical and Food Sciences
- Faculty of Public Health

Schools

- School of Languages
- Inter-American School of Library Studies
- School of Microbiology
- School of Nutrition

Institutes

- Institute of Philosophy
- Institute of Physical Education and Sports
- Institute of Political Studies
- Institute of Regional Studies

Corporations

- Academic Environmental Corporation
- Academic Corporation Basic Biomedical Sciences
- Academic Corporation for the Study of Tropical Pathologies

The university offers 87 undergraduate degrees, 48 specializations, 41 medical specializations, 53 master's degrees and 22 doctoral degrees in Medellín. In the regional campuses, they offer 126 undergraduate degrees and two master's degrees. The UdeA has also a number of international partnerships, offering student exchange programs and some double degrees with foreign institutions, among them: Politecnico di Torino, Universidade de São Paulo, and Politecnico di Milano.

== Admission ==
=== Undergraduate education ===
The undergraduate admission is done through a knowledge test, which is conducted twice a year. The entrance examination is an instrument that measured some basic skills and knowledge that have been obtained is in high school. It is a general aptitude test and as such does not evaluate the applicant regarding the career you want to enter.

The exam consists of two components, Reading Proficiency Test (Spanish) and Logical Reasoning Test (Mathematical Logic) and is equal to the candidates of all programs except for the Faculty of Arts.

To be eligible you must pass a minimum cutoff score and also be within the number of seats available for each academic program. For each semester, the test is often extremely competitive, meaning that the selectivity in admission to each of the academic programs is very high, in some cases presenting the proportion of applicants admitted less than 10%.

=== Postgraduate education ===
In graduate school admission is as complex as in the undergraduate. For general graduate requirements differ depending on the title to obtain and the academic unit in which you want to be done. In general at all levels requires the mastery of a foreign language and there are different requirements such as exams, interviews, proposed work and / or research, undergraduate grades, publications, awards, honors, work experience, research experience, participation in events, presentations, and more.

== Research ==
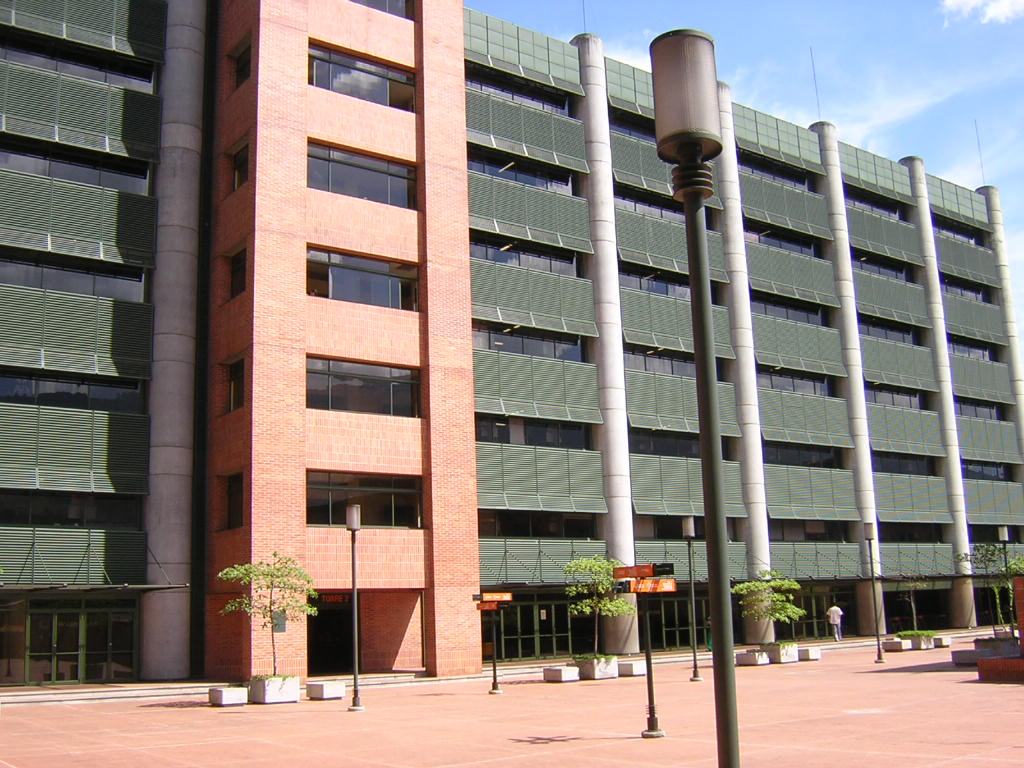
University Research Headquarters

The university has 228 research groups in the categories established by Colciencias (A1, A, B, C and D). In 2006, the university provided an investment of about $145 billion COP for research.

The majority of the excellence groups (A1, A and B) are concentrated at University Research Headquarters (Spanish: Sede de Investigación Universitaria -SIU-) an advanced project created by the university to promote a qualitative and quantitative transformation of its research system..

The SIU supports currently 36 research groups that are classified by Colciencias as categories A and B, working in diverse areas such as biotechnology, chemistry, materials science, genetics, environment, immunology, infectious and tropical diseases.

Along with providing facilities for the development of scientific and technological projects, the SIU encourages promotes interdepartmental research and cooperation with the larger research community.

== Student life ==
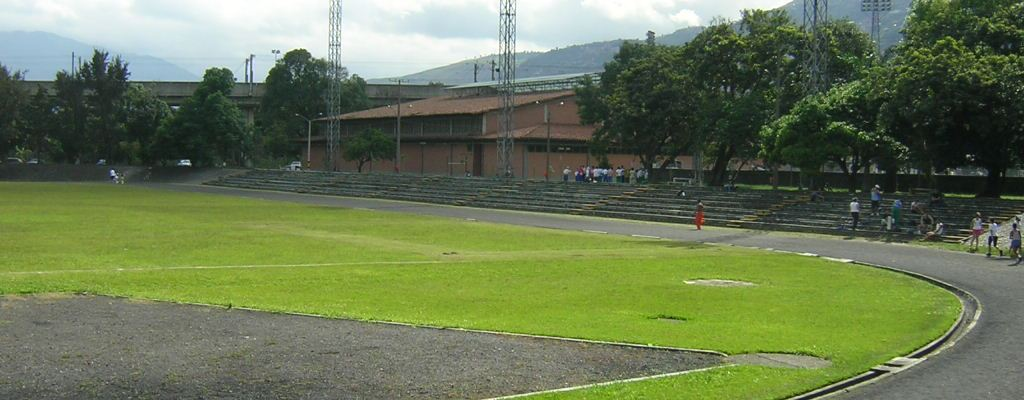
Track and football field

University athletes compete in the West division of ASCUN-Deportes, along with 24 institutions from Antioquia. The games at the division phase qualify teams for national competition. The university offers training and has varsity teams in aikido, chess, track and field, basketball, cycling, climbing, football, futsal, gymnastics, judo, karate, weightlifting, swimming, rugby union, softball, taekwondo, tennis, table tennis, triathlon, ultimate, volleyball, and underwater rugby.

The university supports student groups and organizations involved in academic, art, ecological, social and sports activities. Three cultural groups are administered by the university (academic divisions can run their own groups, however). The three are the Folk Dances Group, the Traditional Student Music Group and the Club of Singers.

== Alumni ==
Former students and professors of the university include former presidents Álvaro Uribe Vélez, Mariano Ospina Pérez, Carlos E. Restrepo, Liborio Mejía and Mariano Ospina Rodríguez, as well as politician Carlos Gaviria Díaz and writer Tomás Carrasquilla. Other alumni include writers Fernando González and Gonzalo Arango, and politician Fabio Valencia Cossio.

== See also ==
- Altair Digital Communication
