= Altair Digital Communication =

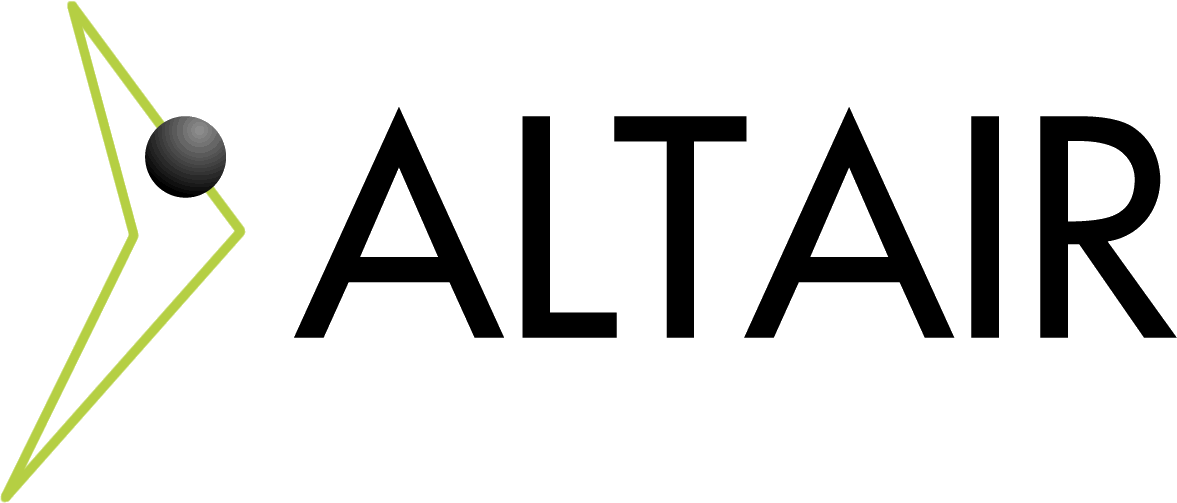
- Company type: Public, Academic, Pioneers in Digital Communication
- Founded: April 2000
- Headquarters: Medellín, Antioquia, {{{location_country}}}
- Area served: Worldwide
- Founder: Luz Dary Gil Cortés
- Website: http://altair.udea.edu.co/

Altair Digital Communication is an academic space for research, production and broadcast for cultural contents based at Faculty of Communications in the University of Antioquia. It works as a virtual station where sound radio-like productions are presented in a Web 2.0 site, created by the university students themselves, who have the opportunity to acquire and develop new knowledge on information technology as well as digital radio and hypermedial content management. It was founded in April 2000, under the name of Radio Altair, Created by student Luz Dary Gil Cortés under the advice of Professor Lucia Restrepo Cuartas. It is a Net radio pioneer project in Latin America, and a very strong predecessor on the free culture.

In the year 2004, Altair was awarded with the University Journalism Award in the best digital feature category due to its proposals on hypermedia field. Some of the programs that have been produced and broadcast on Altair have had recognition on the Emission Awards, which is a Faculty of Communications’ exhibit that gathers some of the student's most significant academic works.

== History ==
The suggestion for a digital radio broadcast system in the Faculty was given by a group of students, created and headed by Luz Dary Gil Cortés. In the beginning, Altair was conceived as a research, extension and teaching support place in virtual communication media. Its consolidation took place in 2001, with the Hypermedial educational contents through Altair for the Antioquia Department project proposal. The project was cofinanced by the Faculty of Communications, the University of Antioquia and Edatel, and it had the approval by the Research Development Committee. The project application took place between 2002 and 2003, and it allowed the physical, technical and human resources acquisition.

From that moment on, the theory groundwork in the hypermedial mainstream strengthens, keeping the online radial content production. The laboratory is now known as Radio Altair – Altair Hypermedia. This new orientation's first components are Antioquia Channel and Educational Altair. The first one refers to the web-based content creation for Antioquia using graphics, text, sound and audiovisual elements regarding the department sub regions.

The second module, Educational Altair, was constituted as the first virtual education effort in the Faculty of Communications. It consists on platforms used by many undergraduate students in the university. The online seminars were Mother tongue and Literature Introduction, certifying 30 students both.

Between 2003 and 2005, the site's technological development was focused on the Net Radio unit improvement. Engineer Whitman Quintero's work, from 2004 to 2005, made live online broadcast possible using Icecast and RealPlayer software. With this new platform, beginning May 2005, the audio streaming was able to be online all day, every day, significantly increasing the production offer. Thus, the content creation ceases to be limited for the Faculty students, being extended to other University sections.

A year later, after observing and analyzing these new offers, a new content diffusion strategy begins. Three custom channels were created to satisfy the differed theme preferences. These three channels were Radio Altair Musik, Radio Altair University, and Radio Altair Colombia. The two first signals were live streaming. The last one emitted an automatic signal.

Altair has managed several hypermedia channels targeted to several audiences: Antioquia Channel, Educational Altair, Altair Kids (which in its moments was the only hypermedial proposal for children in the country), interactive Quixote (released in 2005, during the novel's IV centenary commemoration) and products for the University of Antioquia Cultural Radio Station.

Generally, the Altair hypermedia global operation was carried out in these fronts:

- Research: contribution to academic events and research groups, both by students and teachers.
- Extension: radial and hypermedial content creation for University sections and other particular organizations.
- Teaching support: attention to an average of 30 students of radio-related subjects by means of classes, training and advising for students and teachers regarding tools and concepts in audio production, and advising scholar students in digital radio and hypermedia subjects.
- Teaching school: Students’ participation who acquire advantages in teaching experience as: collaborator, assistant, teacher, researcher.
- Internet radio station: program production regarding operation, preproduction, recording and publishing the student's work.
- Web site: constant information update by digitalizing, publishing and managing the archives.

== See also ==
- Net radio
- Creative Commons
- Internet radio
