= University of Valle Publishing Program =

Publisher in Colombia

- Parent company: University of Valle
- Status: Active
- Founded: 2002
- Country of origin: Colombia
- Headquarters location: Cali, Valle del Cauca
- Distribution: Worldwide
- Publication types: Books and Journals
- Official website: programaeditorial.univalle.edu.co

The University of Valle Publishing Program (Spanish: Programa Editorial de la Universidad del Valle), is the publishing arm of the University of Valle. While its origins can be traced since 1955, when it started operation under the name University of Valle Library (Spanish: Biblioteca de la Universidad del Valle), the current publisher was established under Agreement 005 of the University Council on the 29 of April 2002, and it is regulated by Agreement 006 of 2004. It is a dependency of the Vice-rectory for Research and its editorial board is comprised by the Vice-rectors for Academics and Research, five tenured Professors, and the manager of the program. The program publishes books and scientific journals, both in print and electronic media with more than 300 titles currently on print.

== See also ==
- List of university presses
