= Excellence research center (Colombia) =

The Excellence Research Centers are national networks of research groups in Colombia who pursue a common problem in a scientific and technological area of national strategic importance. The centers are part of the national public policy for the promotion of research through the creation or strengthening of national research programs in complex and priority subjects that require interdisciplinary, interinstitutional, intersectoral, and international collaboration. The centers are funded by COLCIENCIAS and participating universities and institutions.

There are seven participating centers in Colombia:

- Biodiversity and Genetic Resources Research and Studies Center (Spanish: Centro de Investigaciones y estudios en Biodiversidad y Recursos Genéticos, CIEBREG)
- National Research Center for the Agroindustrialization of Aromatic and Medicinal Tropical Vegetable Species (Spanish: Centro Nacional de Investigaciones para la Agroindustrialización de Especies Vegetales Aromáticas y Medicinales Tropicales, CENIVAM)
- Colombian Research Center in Tuberculosis (Spanish: Centro Colombiano de Investigaciones en Tuberculosis, CCITB)
- Excellence Center for Novel Materials (Spanish: Centro de Excelencia en Nuevos Materiales, CENM)
- Excellence Center for Modeling and Simulation of Complex Phenomena and Processes (Spanish: Centro de Excelencia en Modelamiento y Simulación de Fenómenos y Procesos Complejos, CEIBA)
- Colombian Observatory for the Development, the Citizen Convivency, and the Institutional Strengthening in Regions strongly affected by Armed Conflict (Spanish: Observatorio Colombiano para el Desarrollo, la Convivencia Ciudadana y el Fortalecimiento Institucional en Regiones Fuertemente Afectadas por el Conflicto Armado, ODECOFI)
- Colombian Center for Genomics and Bioinformatics of Extreme Environments (Spanish: Centro Colombiano de Genómica y Bioinformática, GeBix)
