= Association of Colombian Universities =

Non-profit organization

The Association of Colombian Universities (Spanish: Asociación Colombiana de Universidades), also known as ASCUN, is a non-profit, non-governmental organization, that congregates the public and private Colombian universities. Its primary objectives are to serve as a permanent space for the discussion of the present and future of the Colombian universities, establish a link between the universities and the national government, perform academic research about higher education, promote continuing education, academic development, establishment of research networks, provide information services, and maintain inter-institutional and international relationships.

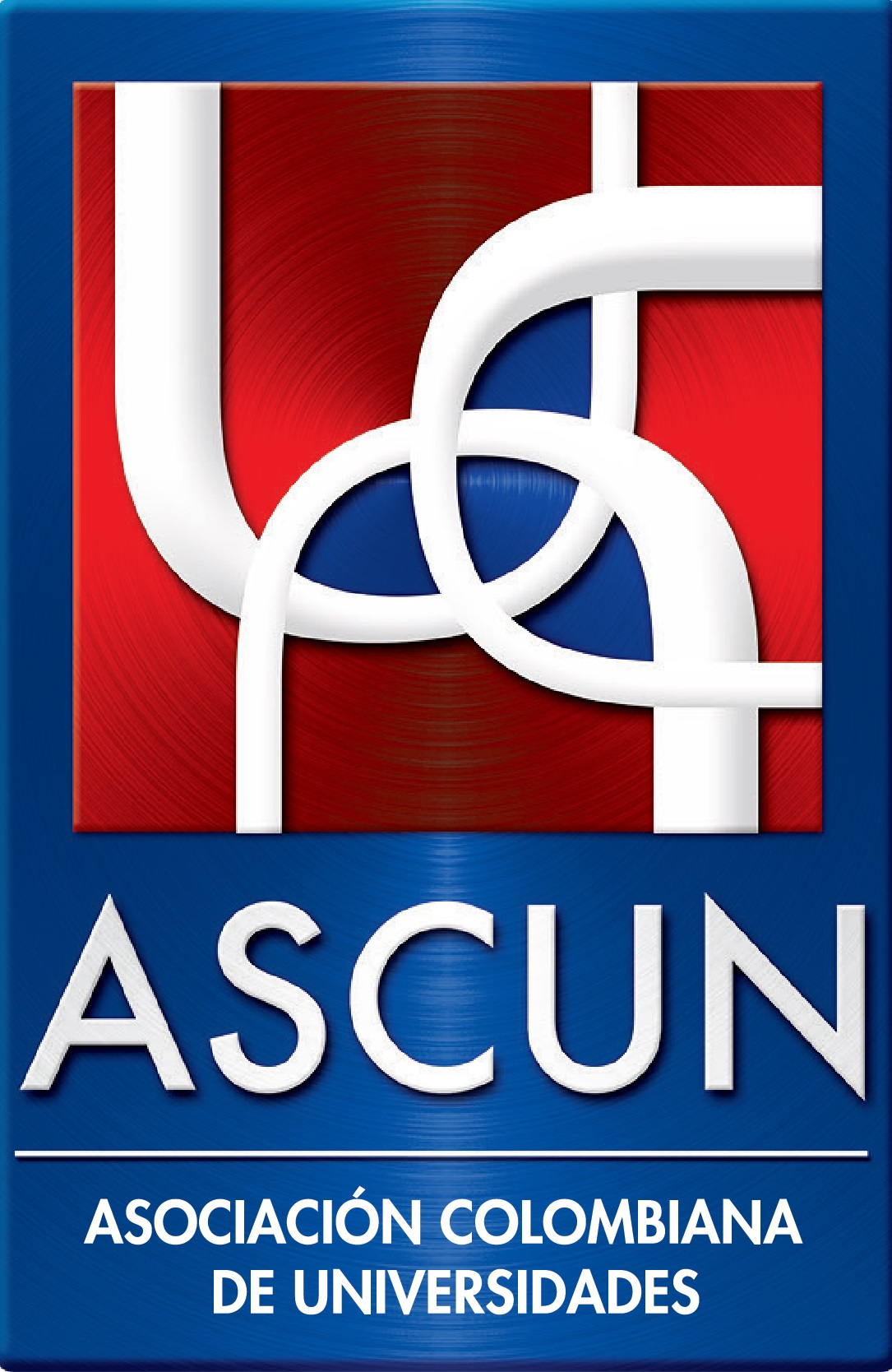
The ASCUN Logo

The association has 75 affiliated institutions, located in the whole country.

== See also ==
- List of universities in Colombia
