= Iberoamerican Association of Postgraduate Universities =

The Iberoamerican Association of Postgraduate Universities (Spanish: Asociación Universitaria Iberoamericana de Postgrado), also known as AUIP, is an international non-governmental organization, recognized by the UNESCO, whose primary objective is the promotion of postgraduate and doctoral studies in Ibero-America. Currently is conformed by more than 130 higher education institutions from Spain, Portugal, Latin America, and the Caribbean.
