= Universia =

University network sponsored by Santander Bank

- Industry: Education
- Founded: July 9, 2000; 25 years ago in Madrid, Spain
- Headquarters: Spain
- Area served: Latin America; Portugal; Spain
- Key people: Javier Roglá CEO
- Parent: Banco Santander
- Website: http://www.universia.net

Universia is a network that consists of 862 universities in 22 countries: Andorra, Argentina, Bolivia, Brazil, Chile, Colombia, Costa Rica, Dominican Republic, Ecuador, El Salvador, Guatemala, Honduras, Mexico, Nicaragua, Panama, Paraguay, Peru, Portugal, Spain, United States, Uruguay, and Venezuela. The network operates a global website that provides services like job searching and themed news. Universia network represented 250,000 registered users as of 2021. Universia is a company of the Santander Group Jaume Pagès Fita has been the CEO of Universia since 2005.

== Objectives ==
The stated goal of Universia is to support talented young people through these three pillars:

- Guidance: Personalized support for students that offers career and training advice to boost their employability.
- Training: Opportunities to undertake courses (bootcamps and postgraduate studies) and training programmes that teach key job skills, with access to scholarships, discounts, ISAs, loans and other funding.
- Employment: Connection with professional (internships or employment) and networking opportunities.

== History ==
Universia was created in July 2000 as an internet initiative in the higher education sector. It is promoted by a group of Spanish universities with the support of the Spanish University Rectors' Board (CRUE), the Spanish National Research Council (CSIC) and sponsored by the Santander Group.

Universia was officially presented in Madrid (Spain) on July 9, 2000, as a Spanish initiative with a clear Spanish American vocation. On the same day almost all the Universia societies were also formally incorporated (Argentina, Brazil, Chile, Colombia, Spain, Mexico, Peru, Puerto Rico and Venezuela). The Portuguese branch was created a year later, followed by Uruguay in November 2005.

During the 2008, Universia welcomed Andorra, Panama, Paraguay and Dominican Republic. In order to expand the network towards the world, during March 2009 the basic information of Universia was published in Wikipedia in five languages under the edition and translation of Pabsi González from Universia Puerto Rico (http://www.universia.pr)

Today, Universia is the largest network of universities in the world and more countries have been added, such as: Bolivia, Costa Rica, Ecuador, El Salvador, Guatemala, Honduras and Nicaragua.

== Services and content ==
=== Preuniversia ===
Assists students from high school and helps them find scholarships as well as the right university or higher education institution.

=== Academic Mobility (MAI) ===
Helps students that are studying abroad and helps the ones that want to do it to find the best programs and scholarships available.

=== Jobs ===
Universia offers jobs in and outside the local job market.

=== Development ===
Offers conferences and seminars for development of professional education

=== Universia News ===
Universia News offers themed news: local universities, international universities, scholarships, jobs, culture and more.

=== Scholarships ===
Universia is the encounter point in which students find monetary aid that helps them continue studying.

=== Calendar ===
Local cultural activities are published.

=== References ===
References and university catalogs are included in this virtual library.

=== Courses ===
Promotion and details of the courses offered in Universia's universities.

=== Academic research ===
Search tool with students’ interests in mind.

=== Blogs ===
Universia's writers create blogs in which students and professors can participate by asking questions, sharing experiences and providing feedback. The four blogs are: Study Abroad, Jobs, Marketing and Movies.

=== Innoversia ===
A system that gets in contact both investigators and businesses in order to find applicable solutions to the current needs of the business world and generate beneficial contributions for both spheres of activity.

=== Universia TV ===
Audiovisual material that shows Universia's community some of the activities and promotions related to students, universities and current academic affairs.

=== Newsletters ===
Universia has four newsletters which can be accessed in the following URL: https://web.archive.org/web/20090317074045/http://www.universia.pr/pdf/publicaciones.jsp

- Universia Knowledge@Wharton
- Next Wave Science
- GCG: Revista de Globalización, Competitividad y Gobernabilidad
- Universia Business Review

== Universia Network ==
- Universia.Net
- Universia Andorra
- Universia Argentina
- Universia Brasil
- Universia Chile
- Universia Colombia Archived 2020-07-23 at the Wayback Machine
- Universia Mexico
- Universia Bolivia
- Universia Costa Rica
- Universia Ecuador
- Universia El Salvador
- Universia Guatemala
- Universia Honduras
- Universia Nicaragua
- Universia Panama
- Universia Paraguay
- Universia Peru
- Universia Portugal
- Universia Dominican Republic
- Universia Spain
- Universia Uruguay
