= Paisa people =

Region in northwestern Colombia; also the demonym for an inhabitant

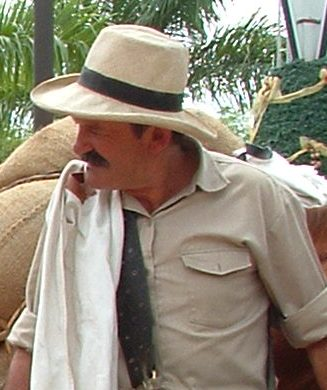
The fictional character Juan Valdez is a paisa stereotype.

A Paisa is someone from a region in the northwest of Colombia, including part of the West and Central cordilleras of the Andes in Colombia. The Paisa region is formed by the departments of Antioquia, Caldas, Risaralda and Quindío. Some regions of Valle del Cauca Department (north) and Tolima Department (west) culturally identify as paisas. The main cities of the Paisa region are Medellín, Pereira, Manizales and Armenia.

The name Paisa derives from the Spanish apocope of Paisano (fellow countryman), but they are also known as "Antioqueños" (those from the old Antioquia, which included the other Paisa provinces, which was a single administrative body until the creation of the Caldas State in 1905). Although many refer to Paisas as an ethnic group (raza antioqueña or raza paisa), they are a part of the Colombians and Latin American peoples.

Paisas can be found in other regions of Colombia and the Americas where they have migrated. They have a particular way of speaking Spanish that some writers refer to as español antioqueño.

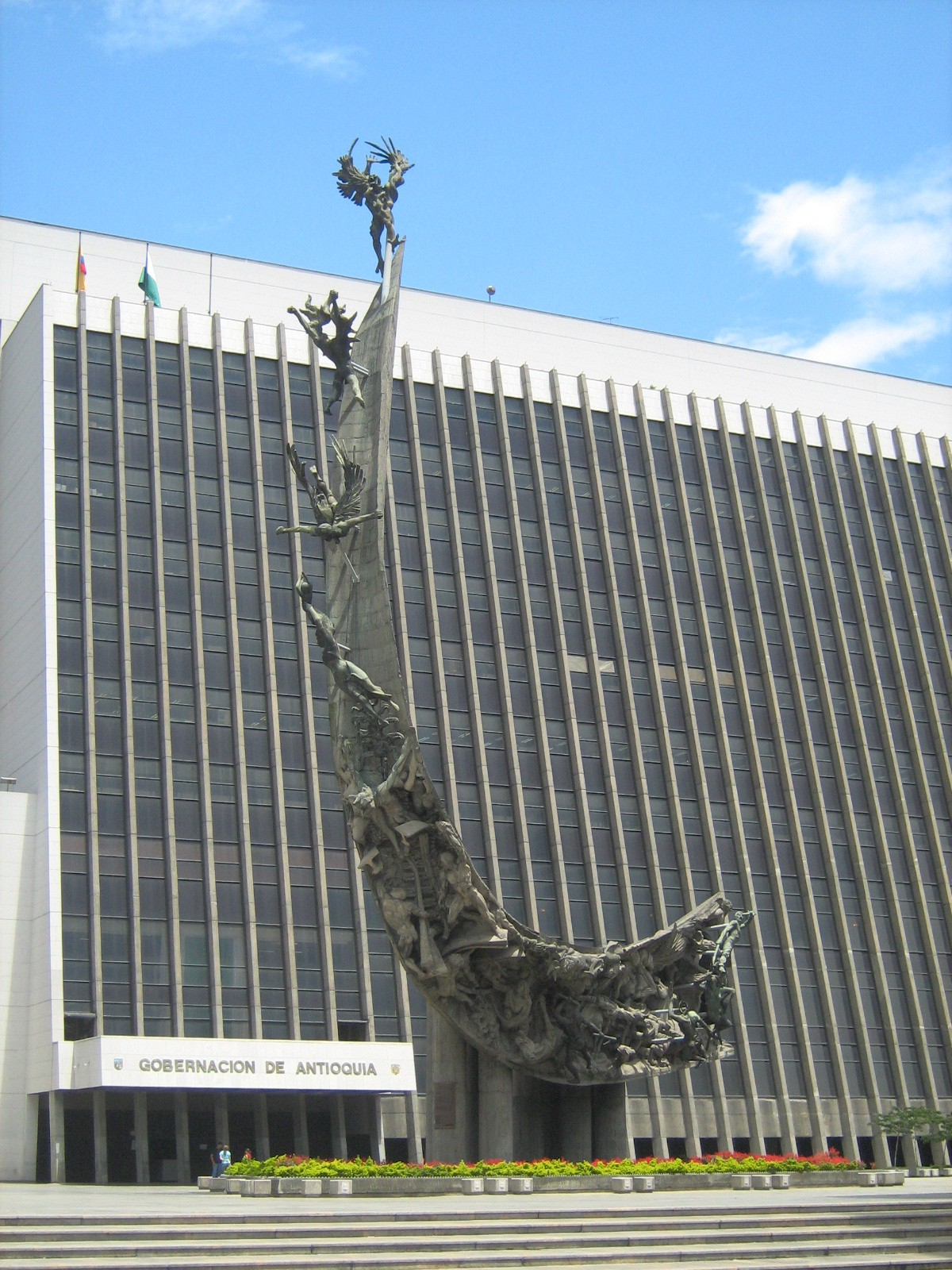
Monumento a la Raza by Rodrigo Arenas. Bronze and concrete, 38 m height, located in La Alpujarra Administrative Center, Medellín, Antioquia.

== Etymology ==
The expression "Paisa" is of popular use as apocope of "Paisano" (person from one's own country; fellow countryman). Consequently, "Paisa Region" is the region where the Paisa people live. A more ancient expression is Antioqueño. All the region once made up the Province (later State) of Antioquia. In 1905, the Caldas Department was created from the southern part of Antioquia, limiting the use of the term Antioqueño only to those of Antioquia, while "Paisa" could refer to people from both the smaller Antioquia and the new department.

== History ==
Francisco César made an expedition in 1537 from Urabá to the Cauca River to the lands of Dabeiba, but his troops were rejected by the army of Nutibara. In 1540 Marshall Jorge Robledo founded Cartago. In 1541 he founded Arma in what is today the south of Antioquia, near today Aguadas and Santa Fe de Antioquia, at the banks of the Cauca River. This last town would become the provincial capital in 1813.

The first colonial governor was Don Gaspar de Rodas (1518–1607). The mountains of Antioquia attracted the Spaniards for its gold and lands for cattle, and the first towns were located near gold mines and rivers. Despite that, the region did not attract a population interested in creating important centers for the Spanish civilization like Cartagena de Indias, Popayán or Bogotá and it remained almost entirely isolated from the rest of the colony. This is the main reason for the cultural identity of the Paisas within the Colombian national context.

Since the seventeenth century and until the end of the nineteenth centuries, Paisa families moved to the southern regions of Antioquia, in what is today the Colombian Coffee-Growers Axis or the "Viejo Caldas" (Old Caldas), though now most Colombian nationals refer to this region as the Eje cafetero. This constant internal migration is known in history as the "Colonización Antioqueña" (Antioquean Colonization). Most of the cities and towns founded in the Old Caldas (Caldas, Risaralda, Quindío and some towns of the north of Valle del Cauca and the west of Tolima) are from that time.

During the wars for the independence of Colombia, the most important Paisa figure was General José María Córdova. He was from Rionegro and fought important battles to free the region from the Spanish regime under the orders of Simón Bolívar, who never went to the region. During Bolívar's campaign to liberate New Granada, Córdoba participated in the Battle of Boyacá and was entitled "Lieutenant Colonel" by the Libertador, despite his young age (he was only 20). Then he was charged by Bolívar to defend the Province of Antioquia and in fact he defeated the Spaniards during the Campaign of Nechí between the end of 1819 and the beginning of 1820.

In 1826 Medellín was declared the capital of the Province of Antioquia. In 1856 a Federalist Political Constitution created the State of Antioquia and it faced some civil wars among Liberals and Conservatives. In 1877 the president of the federal state was Pedro Justo Berrío, who was one of the most prominent political leaders of the region at the end of the century and developed an active politic in education, transportation (including connecting the region with the rest of the country by train in 1874) and economic development.

In 1886, with a centralized Political Constitution, the "Department of Antioquia" was created. Although the region was not affected directly by the Thousand Days War (1899–1902), one of the main characters of the fighting, General Rafael Uribe Uribe at the side of the Liberal Party rebels, came from the area.

The progressive government of General Rafael Reyes (1904–1909) was of benefit in the development for the region. One of his projects was the creation of new departments, including the Caldas Department to be taken from the southern part of Antioquia in 1905. During the twentieth century both Paisa departments (Antioquia and Caldas), would continue their development in industry, mining and agriculture. In 1966 the Caldas Department was divided in three parts: Caldas itself, Quindío and Risaralda.

At the end of the century the region faced the crisis of growing drug traffic mafias, paramilitary groups and guerrillas, especially in Antioquia with the Medellín Cartel and the north of Valle del Cauca. However, development has proved to be a Colombian model in regions like the Metropolitan Area of Medellín according to the Inter-American Development Bank.

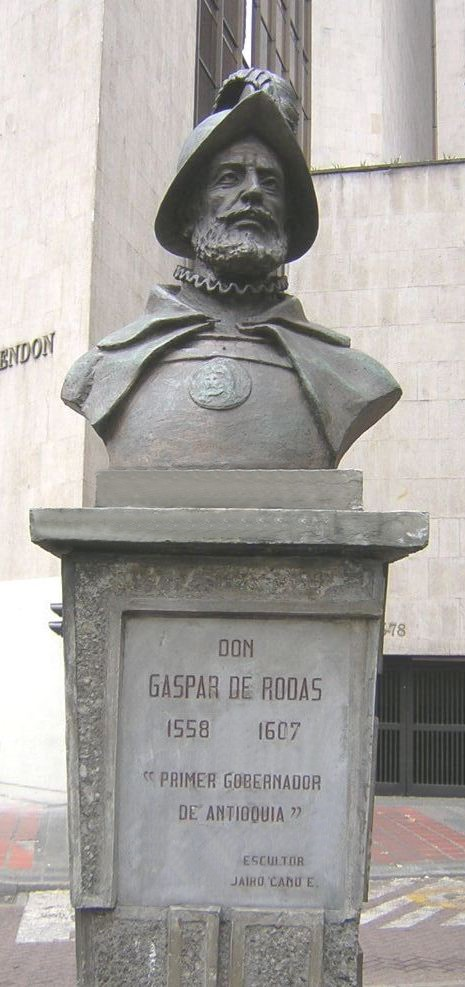
Don Gaspar de Rodas, the first colonial governor of the Province of Antioquia that compressed what is today the Paisa Region.

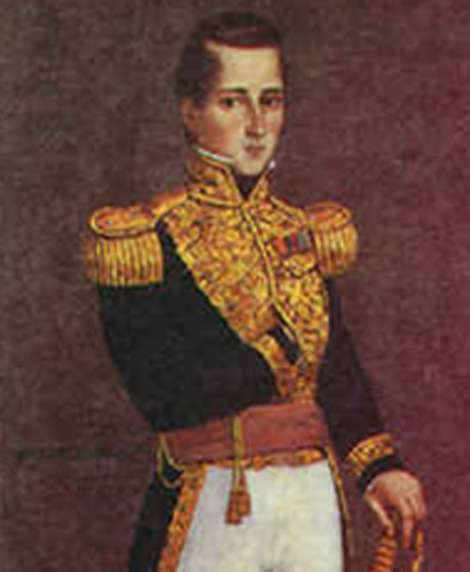
General José María Córdova, the "Bolívar" of the Paisa Region.

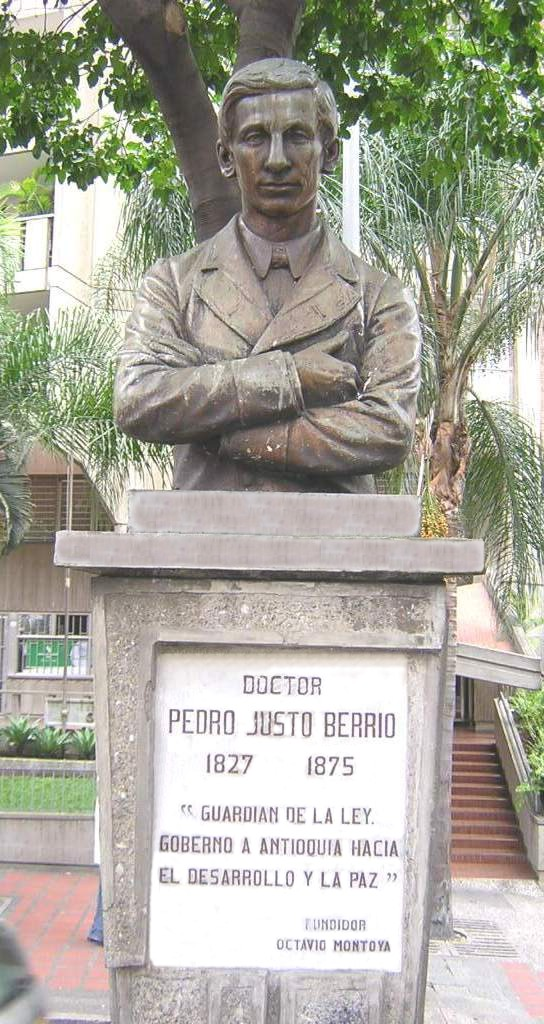
Pedro Justo Berrío, the president of the State of Antioquia that began the Industrial Revolution of the Paisas.

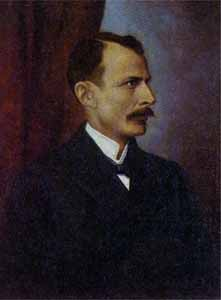
General Rafael Uribe Uribe, one of the leaders of the Rebel Liberals during the Thousand Days War.

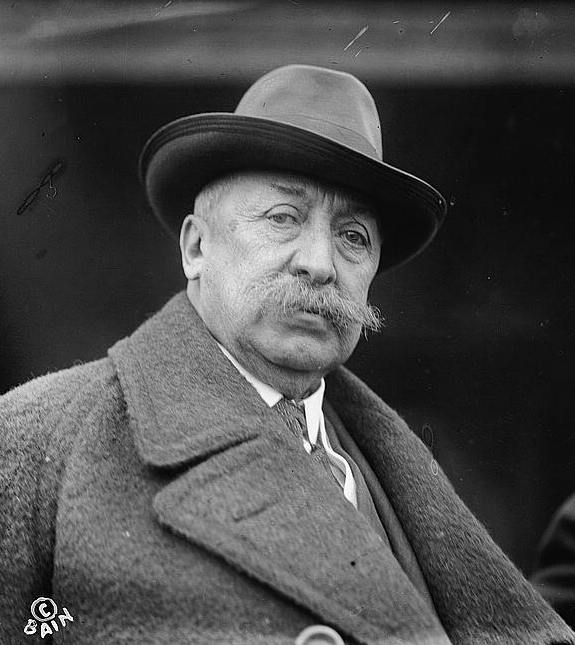
President Rafael Reyes. His policies made a great benefit for the development of the Paisa Region. He proposed the creation of the Caldas Department.

== Geography ==
Although the Paisa region is a cultural entity and is not defined by administrative divisions, it is possible to locate some areas as the natural space of the Paisa people.

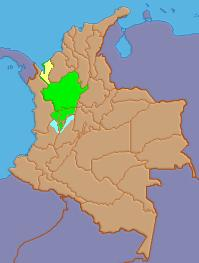
Location of the Paisa Region in Colombia: In yellow the Antioquean Urabá, belonging to the cultural context of the Colombian Caribbean Region; in green the Paisa departments and in blue some Paisa areas of Tolima and Valle del Cauca.

- Antioquia Department: The largest department (63,612 km^{2}), with a population of 6,299,886. However, some areas of the department are not considered culturally Paisa, like the Antioquean Urabá and the north, more integrated into the Caribbean Region of Colombia. The Paisas are located especially in the mountainous part of the province, in the center and south, in what is called the Montaña Antioqueña (Antioquean Mountain). The capital is Medellín, the second most important urban and industrial center of Colombia. Other big cities are located in the Metropolitan Area of Medellín, Rionegro, La Ceja, Santa Fe de Antioquia, Puerto Berrío, Yarumal and others. The southwest of the Department (Suroeste Antioqueño) is a part of the Colombian coffee growing axis.
- Caldas Department: It was established in 1905 and has an area of 7,888 km^{2} with a population of 908,841. The capital is Manizales, founded by Antioquean colonists in 1849.
- Risaralda Department: It was established in 1966 from the territory of Caldas. It has an area of 4,140 km^{2} and a population of 863,663. The capital is Pereira (founded in 1863).
- Quindío Department: It was established in 1966 also from Caldas with Armenia as its capital. It is one of the smallest departments of Colombia (1,845 km^{2}) and has a population of 518,691 persons.
- Tolima Department: Some towns in the northwest of Tolima are of Paisa origin: Roncesvalles (founded by Antioqueans in 1905), Herveo (1860), Líbano (1849), Casabianca (1886), Murillo (1871), Anzoategui (1895); Villahermosa (f. 1887).
- Valle del Cauca Department: The towns in the northeast of Valle del Cauca are also of Paisa origin: Sevilla (founded by Antioqueans in 1903), Alcalá (1819), Argelia (1904, known also as Medellincito, Little Medellín), Bolívar (1884), Caicedonia (1910), Cartago (1540), El Aguila (1905), La Unión (1890), Versalles (1894), Trujillo (1922).

== Economy ==
The Paisa Region coincided with the important economic centers of Colombia like the Metropolitan Area of Medellín (textile, industries like appliances, automobiles and chemicals, services like health care and fashion); the Colombian Coffee-Growers Axis in agriculture and other economic activities like flower growing, cattle, gold and coal mines, tourism and others.

== Culture ==
=== Language ===
The way Paisas speak Spanish, also known as Antioquean Spanish, is distinctive within Colombia. Paisas are said to speak Spanish slow and soft. They have many local and regional expressions that are opaque even for other Colombians. From the rural Paisa dialect, a popular urban version called Parlache developed.

- Voseo (using vos instead of tú): In colloquial speech, Paisas use vos as the second person singular informal pronoun (instead of tú) and usted for formal address, although it is common to use usted even with relatives and friends. However, vos is restricted to colloquial use and, unlike exclusively voseo regions that use it for official purposes like the press and government, vos in the Paisa Region is rarely used in official documents. Several Paisa writers (such as Tomás Carrasquilla, Fernando González Ochoa, Manuel Mejía Vallejo, Fernando Vallejo, and Gonzalo Arango) use vos in their works as a distinct marker of the Paisa identity. However, the use of tú is well known due to the immigration of Colombian groups like the Costeños.
- Seseo (lack of distinction between /θ/ and /s/): As with most American dialects of Spanish, Paisas do not distinguish ‹s› from ‹z› or soft ‹c›. While seseo is dominant, the Paisa /s/ is articulated as an apicoalveolar [s̺], a sound transitional between [s] and [ʃ], as in central and northern Spain and southern Central America. The apicoalveolar 's' was influenced by Basques, Catalans, and Extremadurans, and seseo was influenced by Andalusians and Canarians.
- Yeísmo (merger of /ʎ/ into /ʝ/): Paisas pronounce ‹ll› as ‹y›, so that there is no distinction between cayó (it fell) and calló (became silent).
- The voiced consonants /b/, /d/, and /ɡ/ are pronounced as plosives after and sometimes before any consonant, like other Colombian dialects (rather than the fricative or approximant that is characteristic of most other dialects). Thus pardo [ˈpaɾdo], barba [ˈbaɾba], algo [ˈalɡo], peligro [peˈliɡɾo], desde [ˈdezde] (dialectally [ˈdehde] or [ˈdedːe])—rather than the [ˈpaɾðo], [ˈbaɾβa], [ˈalɣo], [peˈliɣɾo], [ˈdezðe] (dial. [ˈdehðe] etc.) of Spain and the rest of Spanish America. A notable exception is the region of Nariño and most Costeño speech (Atlantic coastal dialects) which feature the soft, fricative realizations common to all other Hispanic American and European dialects.
- The phoneme /x/ is realized as a glottal [h] like in all other regions of Colombia, except Nariño Department, where the phoneme is realized as velar [x]. This phoneme is also heard in southern Mexico, Guatemala, El Salvador, Honduras, Nicaragua, most of Venezuela, Ecuadorian coast, the Spanish-speaking islands of the Caribbean, the Canary Islands, and southern Spain—as well as occasionally in Chile, Peru, and Northwest Argentina.

=== Land and inheritance ===
Paisas are very attached to their families and land. As their natural cultural space is on the mountains, it is also a symbol of their land. They give a great importance to surnames and ancestors. They even associate surnames to towns (los Pérez son de San Pedro de los Milagros, the Pérez [family] are from San Pedro de los Milagros). Though the patrilinear character is very important for families, Paisas keep a strong matriarchal culture.

Paisas are well known in Colombia for their kindness and welcoming attitude to people from other regions and visitors. They are known to joke and exaggerate creating enjoyable conversations, though this can confuse those who are not used to their way of speaking. They speak proudly of their land, towns, cities, history, traditions and abilities in commerce. It is common for Paisas not to use their local demonym (medellinenses, manizalitas, etc.), but to refer to themselves as simply Paisas.

=== Cuisine ===
The Paisa cuisine is very influenced by their traditional rural background of the mountains. It belongs to the Colombian Andes cuisine with abundance of beans, rice, maize, pork and cattle meat, tropical fruits, potato and several types of vegetables.

- Bandeja paisa: This is a more traditional dish and is generally composed by carne asada (grilled steak) or carne molida (finely ground grilled steak), chicharrón (fried pork rind), rice, red beans, a slice of avocado, sweet fried plantains, a fried egg, a small white corn arepa, and sometimes chorizo (sausage). Bandeja paisa is also a very popular dish served in Colombian restaurants in Europe and the United States.
- Sopa de mondongo.
- Empanada antioqueña.
- Frijoles.
- Mazamorra.
- Rice with Chicken.
- Arepa antioqueña.

=== Music ===
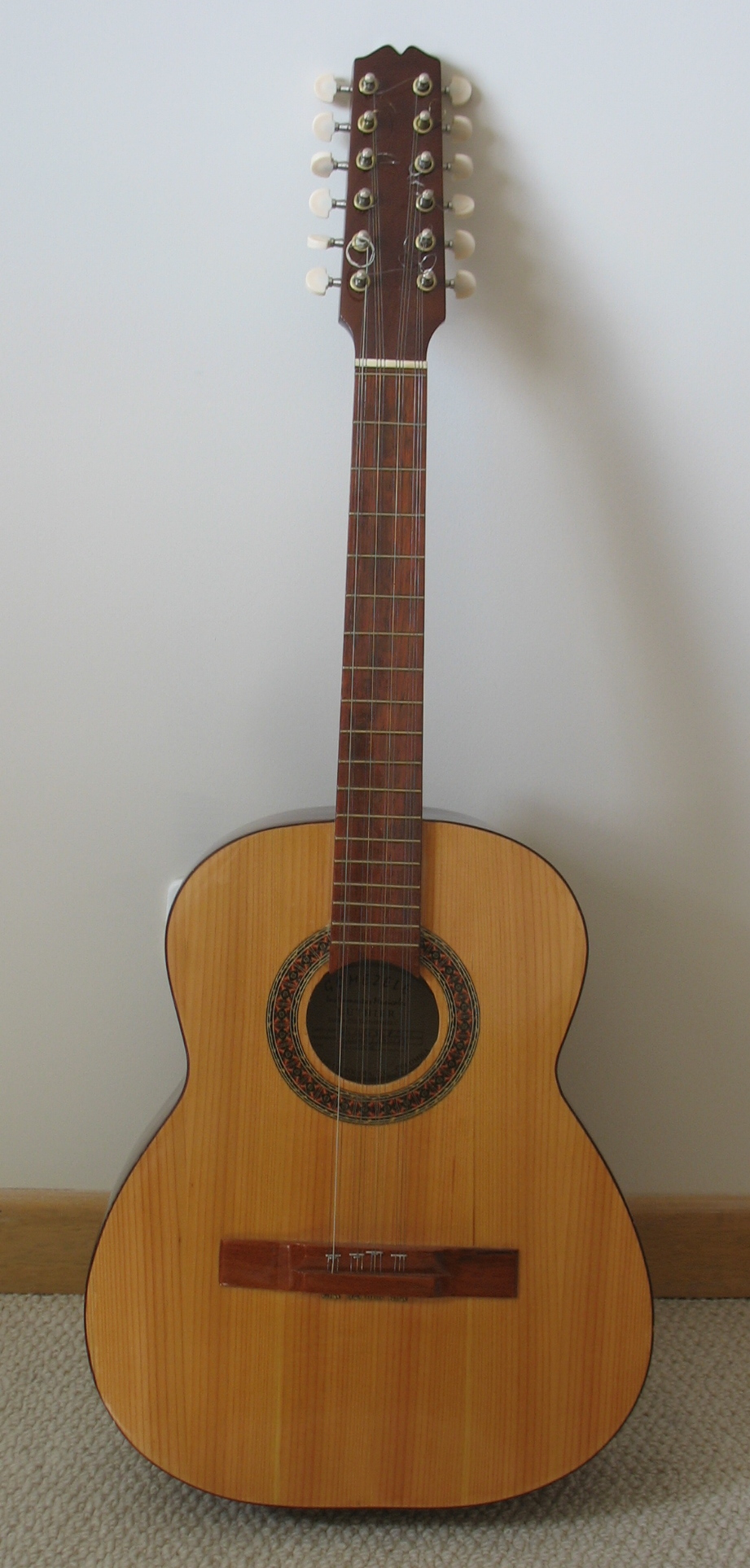
The Tiple, traditional instrument in the Paisa folklore in genres like the Paisa Trova and Pasillo.

The Paisa Region is center of different genres of music among traditional, modern and adopted. The most important instruments of music by tradition are the tiple and the guitar.

- Traditional:
  - Pasillo: In the Paisa Region has had a great diffusion as it is proven by the annual National Festival of the Colombian Pasillo in Aguadas. Carlos Vieco is one of the best known Paisa composers of Pasillo for example with "Hacia el Calvario" ("Towards Calvary").
  - Rail Music: In Spanish Música de Carrilera is the Paisa "Country music". It was originated in Antioquia, especially along the Antioquia Railway. It is also known as "Música guasca".
  - Songs of Heartbreak: In Spanish Música de despecho. In Colombia this genre became identity of the Paisa region. The composer and musician Darío Gómez of San Jerónimo has been nominated "The King of the Songs of Heartbreak" (El Rey del Despecho). His song "Nadie es eterno" ("Nobody is Eternal") became one of the most popular song in Colombia. Other artists of this genre are El Charrito Negro, Luis Alberto Posada, Jhonny Rivera, Lady Yuliana, Pipe Bueno, Giovany Ayala, Grupo Tornado, Fernando Burbano, Bera, El Andariego and many others. The Paisa - American Lucía Pulido is the main artist of this genre in United States.
  - Paisa Trova: In Spanish Trova paisa. It shows the creativity, humor, mentality, and identity of the Paisas. The most important is to create new Trovas in every performance. Salvo Ruiz and Ñito Restrepo from Concordia are regarded as the fathers of the Paisa Trova.
- Adopted:
  - Tango: This Argentinian and Uruguayan music became popular in Antioquia during the first part of the twentieth century, maybe due to Argentinian migrations to Medellín. In 1935 the King of Tango, Carlos Gardel, died in a plane crash in the Paisa capital. The Paisa writer Manuel Mejía Vallejo wrote "Aire de Tango" (Air of Tango), a work that shows the big influence of Tango in the modern Paisa folklore. The Tango Festival takes place in Barrio Manrique of Medellín where is the "Tangovía" and a monument to Gardel.
  - Vallenato: This music from the Caribbean Region of Colombia (Valledupar), has found in the Paisa Region its place. It was brought especially by young students from the north of Colombia who came to study in the Andean cities. There are several Paisa music groups of Vallenato.

=== Religion ===
Roman Catholicism in Colombia arrived in the region with the Spaniard colonizers at the beginning of the sixteenth century. Franciscans settled along with colonizers and built churches and monasteries in the towns founded by the Spaniards. Perhaps Spanish and Portuguese marranos arrived in the region as well. Roman Catholicism became the predominant religion and Paisas remained devout and churchgoing. The 1991 Colombian Political Constitution that decreed freedom of religion opened the gates to other religious denominations, though Paisas are considered Catholics by culture. The theory of Jewish origins has benefited the Jewish communities in the region as well. The two first Colombian persons recognized by the Catholic Church as blessed or saints are from the Paisa Region: Laura Montoya (from Jericó) and Mariano de Jesús Euse (from Yarumal). A Paisa prelate from Tolima, Cardinal Alfonso López Trujillo, was close to the Pope John Paul II.

== Genetics ==
The Paisas have been considered a genetically isolated population according to scientific studies. As evidenced by the analysis of direct-line mitochondrial DNA or mtDNA (inherited from mother-to-child) and Y-chromosomal DNA or Y-DNA (inherited from father-to-son), the initial founding of the Paisa population occurred primarily through the admixture of male Iberians (mostly from various Spaniard and Portuguese ethnic groups, and a smaller Sephardic Jewish element) and female Amerindians.

Ultimately, this led to the predominantly European ancestry of today's Paisa population, with asymmetrical, sex-specific genetic markers inherited from the founding population. Y-DNA indicates predominantly European male forebears and mtDNA indicates predominantly Amerindian female ancestors. The average population does still carry a significant amount of Native American ancestry, ranging from 20% to 40%, and from 4% to 10% for African.

=== Extremadura ===
The ancestors of the Paisa are primarily Spanish immigrants from Extremadura, Spain (sixteenth century). The first colonizers were Extremaduran like Gaspar de Rodas of Trujillo, who was the first colonial governor of the region. Several towns, cities and places in the Paisa Region are also Extremaduran: Medellín (see Medellín in Spain), Cáceres (see Cáceres in Spain), Valdivia (a small town near Badajoz).

=== Andalusia ===
Some Andalusias, like Jorge Robledo of Jaén, also came with the Extremadurans during the sixteenth century. During the seventeenth century, a group of Andalusian migrants is said to have settled the region.

=== Basque people ===
The presence of Basque ancestry in the Paisa Region is exhibited by the proliferation of Basque surnames. Some scholars point out that this may be one of the regions of Hispanic America with the greatest concentration of ancestry from the Iberian region. The Basques arrived in Antioquia during the seventeenth century.

The use of Basque language (Euskera) terminology in the present territory of Colombia goes back to the early exploration which occurred in 1499, during the third voyage of Columbus. It is said that from that time the territory experienced a strong influx of Basques including prominent figures such as the pilot and geographer Juan de la Cosa, nicknamed "El Vizcaíno" (although some reputable sources claim that he was not a native of the Basque Country, but was instead born in Santoña, Cantabria).

Thereafter, the Basques began to come regularly and distributed throughout the country. Due to this presence, the Colombian department of Antioquia has been considered a major point of Basque-Navarre immigration. This occurred mainly during the colonial era, when thousands of Basques migrated to be linked to the Spanish colonization companies.

To people interested in investigating the presence of Euskal Herria in the department of Antioquia, one of the questions that troubles them relates to the use and retention of the Basque language in the department.

It is estimated that for Antioquia, a region where tens of thousands of Spaniards arrived, of which a good portion were Basque, limited aspects of the Basque language were brought over. It has been difficult to track the use of Euskera in Antioquia and Colombia because the Basque language was always an outcast, which apparently left no written evidence in Antioquia.

This is likely because the Spanish crown, to maintain the monopoly of its overseas companies and to restrict those people not belonging to Spanish rule, did not allow languages other than Castilian to be spoken. This meant that those invited to participate in the colonization of Indian companies, and foreigners in general, had to learn the official language, i.e., Castilian, hence the prevalence of Castilian-Basque-speaking bilinguals.

Despite these restrictions, it is still possible to trace the history of Colombia's ties to the ancient language of the Basques. A reference that has use of Euskera in Colombian territory occurred in relation to Lope de Aguirre, a native of Gipuzkoa nicknamed "The Madman". Aguirre's rebellion defied the Spanish empire, carrying out acts against the subjects of the Spanish crown. Pedro de Ursúa, a Navarrese faithful to the Spanish king, who was also the founder of Pamplona in eastern Colombia, said that he could persuade the soldiers to be part of Aguirre's revolt, if they spoke in Euskera.

During the seventeenth and eighteenth century, Basque families from Northern Spain settled in the Aburrá Valley where Medellín and Envigado are located, as well as small towns in eastern Antioquia, such as Marinilla, El Retiro and El Santuario. This part of Antioquia reminded these families of northern Spain.

=== Sephardi Jews ===
There is debate about Jewish ancestry in the Paisa people.

It was known that some Spanish and Portuguese New Christians of Sephardic Jewish ancestry (some of whom continued to practice Judaism secretly, and were also known as marranos, Spanish for swine) fled the Cartagena de Indias Inquisition and took refuge in the Antioquian mountains during the sixteenth and seventeenth century. Some Colombian authors like Jorge Isaacs and Miguel Ángel Osorio have claimed that it is indisputable that Paisas have Jewish ancestry. Several Paisa surnames are known to have been prevalent among New Christian conversos of Sephardic Jewish origin, for example Espinosa, Pérez, Mejía, and many others.

Some scholars state that the presence of Sephardic Jews among the ancestors of Paisas is a fact, but it does not mean that all Paisas descend from them, nor that it is the only or predominant element among those that do, as is proven by the Paisas' descent from other groups like Basques, Extremadurans, and Andalusians.

=== Canarians ===
There are records also of presence of some Canarians and Canarian families, at least some of them known to be from Lanzarote, who settled in Cáceres, Antioquia, in the second half of the 16th century. Others emigrated in 1678 by the terms of the Tributo de Sangre to Santa Marta. In 1536, Pedro Fernández de Lugo led an expedition of 1,500 people, 400 of whom were Canarians from all the different islands that make up the archipelago), for the conquest of the area around what became Santa Marta. This contingent pacified the warring tribes on the coast and penetrated into the interior (including Paisa region). On the way, they founded several cities, two which, Las Palmas and Tenerife, still exist. In addition, Pedro de Heredia led 100 men from the Canary Islands to Cartagena de Indias.

== Notables ==
Several Paisa personalities have been famous in regional, national and international contexts in every field of science, sport, music, technology, economy, politics and even crime. Some of the most notable in an international context:

- Artists: Sculptor Rodrigo Arenas Betancur, musicians Karol G, Feid, Juanes, Kali Uchis, J Balvin, Maluma, painter and sculptor Fernando Botero, Prima Ballerina Freya Monroy, painter Débora Arango, philosopher Fernando González, writers Tomás Carrasquilla, Fernando Vallejo, Porfirio Barba-Jacob, Gonzalo Arango.
- Sport: Football players Víctor Aristizábal, René Higuita, Juan Pablo Ángel, Iván Córdoba, Juan Fernando Quintero, David Ospina and Andrés Escobar, golfer Camilo Villegas, cyclist Mariana Pajón.
- Journalists: Baldomero Sanín Cano.
- Politicians: Belisario Betancur Cuartas, César Gaviria, Sergio Fajardo, Marco Fidel Suárez, Álvaro Uribe, Federico Gutiérrez, Iván Duque
- Heroes: General José María Córdova.
- Religious: Cardinal Alfonso López Trujillo, Laura Montoya, Mariano de Jesús Euse.
- Infamous: Pablo Escobar, Manuel Marulanda Vélez, Fabio Vásquez Castaño, Luis Alfredo Garavito Cubillos, Carlos Castaño Gil, Vicente Castaño, Fidel Castaño, Jorge Luis Ochoa, Fabio Ochoa Vásquez, Juan David Ochoa, Carlos Lehder, Daniel Rendón Herrera, John Jairo Velásquez, Gustavo Gaviria Rivero, Dandeny Muñoz Mosquera, Miguel Arroyave, Ernesto Báez, Carlos Mario Jiménez, Hernán Giraldo.
