= Puerto Berrío =

- Municipality and town
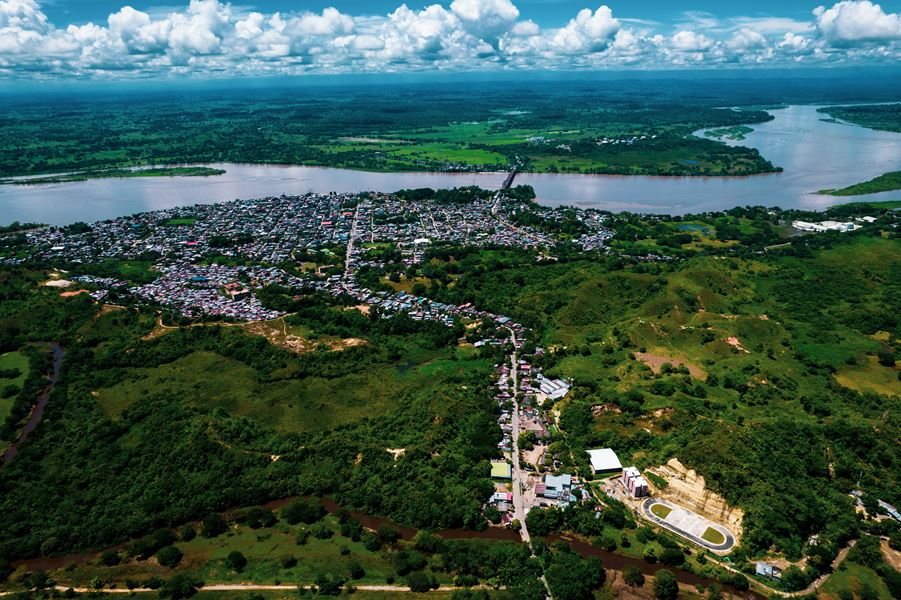

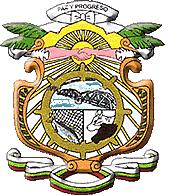
- Flag Coat of arms

- Location of the municipality and town of Puerto Berrío in the Antioquia Department of Colombia

- Location in Colombia
- Coordinates: 6°29′24″N 74°24′9″W
- Country: Colombia
- Department: Antioquia Department
- Subregion: Magdalena Medio

Area
  - Municipality and town: 1,220 km^{2} (470 sq mi)
  - Urban: 6.15 km^{2} (2.37 sq mi)

Population (2020 est.)
  - Municipality and town: 51,079
  - Density: 41.9/km^{2} (108/sq mi)
  - Urban: 35,038
  - Urban density: 5,700/km^{2} (14,800/sq mi)
- Time zone: UTC-5 (Colombia Standard Time)

Puerto Berrío is a municipality and town in the Colombian department of Antioquia. It is part of the Magdalena Medio Antioquia sub-region.

== Geography ==
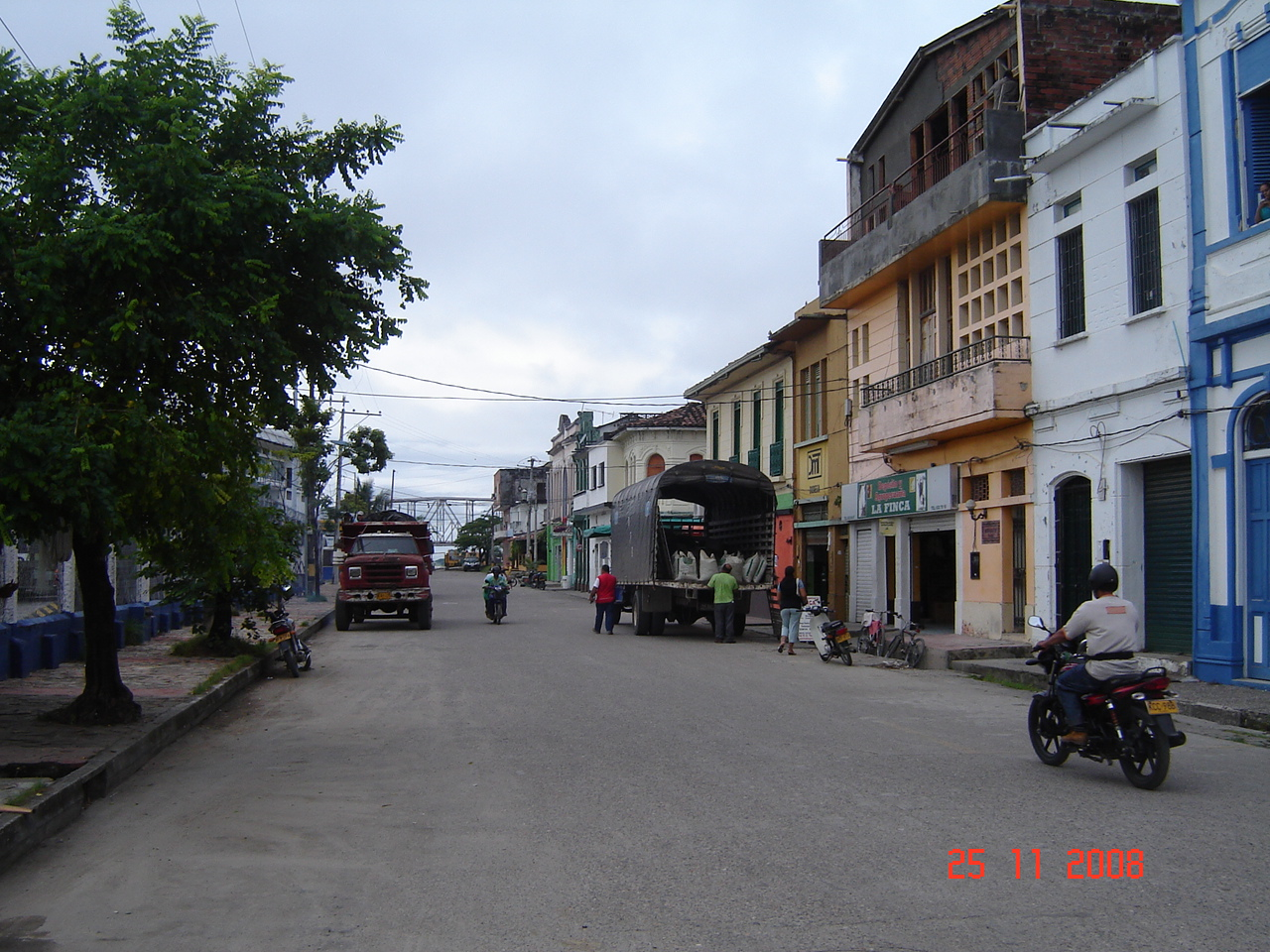
Puerto Berrío

Puerto Berrío is located in a region of Antioquia known as the Middle Magdalena (near the Magdalena River). It is bounded on the north by the municipalities of Yolombó, Remedios and Yondó, on the east by the department of Santander, on the south by the municipalities of Puerto Nare and Caracolí, and on the west by the municipalities of Caracolí and Maceo. It is some 191 km away from the city of Medellín, capital of Antioquia. The municipality has an extension of 1,184 km².

== History ==
Puerto Berrio was founded in 1875 by Colombian General Ricardo Maria Giraldo. It became a municipality in 1881.

In 1801, Alexander von Humboldt drew up an official sketch of the place then known as Great Eddy in the region of the today Puerto Berrío. Later, the Cuban engineer Francisco Javier Cisneros, constructor of the Antioquia Railway, selected this same place to construct a port for the department of Antioquia by the Magdalena River, and also establish it as a railroad station.

In 1875, the government of Antioquia ordered by decree the official establishment of the town and named it after former governor of Antioquia and General of Colombia Pedro Justo Berrío. Since then Puerto Berrío's development has been tied to the railroad. When the railways extended to Medellín in 1914 Puerto Berrio became an important port for shipments of products going over the Magdalena river, distributing Antioquia products to other main ports over the river and exports to through the Caribbean Sea.

In 1925, a fire devastated all the population, with the exception of the facilities of the Railroad. The town went through a reconstruction process to quickly recover. Puerto Berrío became an epicenter of the regional commerce and site forced for the transit of load, passengers and tourists. This although economic one lasted until 1963, when Railroad of Antioquia was nationalized. Due to the intensification of the Colombian armed conflict the flow of the economy drastically decreased.

In 1991 in an effort to recover the government helped establish an association to recover the navigation. This was created, with constitutional rank, the Corporation of the Great river of the Magdalena, in order to recover the navigability of the river.

Nowadays, it is an intermediate city of great commercial movement, and is considered the capital of the Antioquian Mid-Magdalena, with a history related to Magdalena River and to Railroad of Antioquia. Its condition of multimodal port, the possibility of connection with Medellín, Bogotá, Santander Department and North Coast by land, and their airport, has been determining in the development of the region. Majestic Hotel Magdalena recovered well like witness of more than 125 years of history, and attractive the natural exuberantes, are his more appraised tourist treasures to the date.

== Economy ==
- Agriculture: Cacao, Maize, Banana, Yuca, Lemon
- Cattle ranch: Milk and derivatives
- Mining of Gold
- Logging
- Fishing
- Informal commerce
- Arts & Crafts: Atarrayas and Chichorros.

== Celebrations ==
- Celebrations of the Return and Reign of Ecology, celebration emblem of the municipality
- Celebrations of Virgin of the Carmen
- Festival of Cometa
- Festival the Night of Poet s
- Fiestas of Anniversary
- Festival of Dance s and Música Folkloric.

== Notable residents ==
- Juan José Florián, para-cyclist and former paramilitary soldier

== Climate ==
Climate data for Puerto Berrío (Morela Airport), elevation 150 m (490 ft), (1981–2010)
Month	Jan	Feb	Mar	Apr	May	Jun	Jul	Aug	Sep	Oct	Nov	Dec	Year
Mean daily maximum °C (°F)	33.4 (92.1)	33.7 (92.7)	33.0 (91.4)	32.5 (90.5)	32.5 (90.5)	32.7 (90.9)	33.0 (91.4)	33.1 (91.6)	32.3 (90.1)	31.9 (89.4)	32.1 (89.8)	32.6 (90.7)	32.7 (90.9)
Daily mean °C (°F)	28.9 (84.0)	29.2 (84.6)	28.9 (84.0)	28.6 (83.5)	28.6 (83.5)	28.6 (83.5)	28.7 (83.7)	28.6 (83.5)	28.3 (82.9)	28.0 (82.4)	28.0 (82.4)	28.4 (83.1)	28.5 (83.3)
Mean daily minimum °C (°F)	22.9 (73.2)	23.2 (73.8)	23.3 (73.9)	23.3 (73.9)	23.3 (73.9)	23.0 (73.4)	22.7 (72.9)	22.6 (72.7)	22.6 (72.7)	22.7 (72.9)	23.0 (73.4)	23.1 (73.6)	23.0 (73.4)
Average precipitation mm (inches)	49.0 (1.93)	85.1 (3.35)	187.4 (7.38)	318.6 (12.54)	278.0 (10.94)	225.5 (8.88)	225.7 (8.89)	264.7 (10.42)	345.4 (13.60)	316.4 (12.46)	188.2 (7.41)	104.1 (4.10)	2,588 (101.9)
Average precipitation days (≥ 1.0 mm)	7	10	13	19	20	18	18	20	21	20	16	11	189
Average relative humidity (%)	77	76	78	81	81	80	79	79	80	81	81	80	79
Mean monthly sunshine hours	217.0	175.0	145.7	159.0	186.0	198.0	226.3	223.2	186.0	176.7	183.0	201.5	2,277.4
Mean daily sunshine hours	7.0	6.2	4.7	5.3	6.0	6.6	7.3	7.2	6.2	5.7	6.1	6.5	6.2
Source: Instituto de Hidrologia Meteorologia y Estudios Ambientales
