= Women's football in Colombia =

- Country: Colombia
- Governing body: Colombian Football Federation
- National team: Women's national team
- Nicknames: Las Chicas Superpoderosas, Las Cafeteras
- First played: 1942; 84 years ago

Club competitions
- Liga Femenina BetPlay Dimayor

International competitions
- Olympics; FIFA Women's World Cup; Copa América Femenina; Copa Libertadores de Fútbol Femenino

Women's football in Colombia is governed by the Colombian Football Federation. Although the sport is growing in popularity many females still experience prejudice for playing it.

== History ==
Although football in Colombia was introduced in 1892, the first documented women's match was played in 1942 in Bucaramanga. In 1968 the Liga de Fútbol Femenino de Bogotá was created, the first documented women's amateur football league. One of the earliest matches was an exhibition game held in Cali in 1971, in which players were divided into squads representing Deportivo Cali and América de Cali. That same year an amateur tournament with 16 teams from the Valle del Cauca region was held at the Estadio Panamericano in Cali, one the earliest national-level women's football tournament in the country, with teams representing Caicedonia, Sevilla, El Cerrito, Palmira and Cali taking part. Several editions of a regional tournament followed in Valle del Cauca, though with various interruptions, eventually leading the group of players involved to organise a team that took part in the first official national tournament.

In 1991, the División del Fútbol Aficionado (DIFÚTBOL) began organising national amateur tournaments for women, marking the first attempt to bring together a countrywide, officially sanctioned competition. For over two decades afterwards, the qualifying berth to the Copa Libertadores Femenina was decided through an amateur competition known as the Copa Pre-Libertadores, contested by non-professional clubs; the team Formas Íntimas won every edition of that competition.

In March 2016 the División Mayor del Fútbol Profesional Colombiano (Dimayor) formally announced the creation of a professional women's league, with the initiative confirmed the following month.

== Club football ==
The Colombian Women's Football League (officially the Liga Profesional Femenina) is the top tier of women's club football in Colombia, organised by Dimayor. Its first season was played in 2017 with 18 participating clubs; Independiente Santa Fe won the inaugural title after beating Atlético Huila across two legs, becoming the club's first women's championship and earning qualification to the 2017 Copa Libertadores Femenina. Manuela González, of Atlético Bucaramanga, finished as the tournament's top scorer with 13 goals.

Santa Fe and Deportivo Cali are the league's most successful clubs, with three titles each. The league champion qualifies to the Copa Libertadores Femenina. The competition experienced a period of uncertainty in 2024, when the number of participating clubs and the format for the season were confirmed only shortly before the tournament's start.

== National team ==
The first Colombia women's national team made its international debut at the 1998 South American Women's Football Championship in Argentina, defeating Venezuela and Chile before losing to Brazil and Peru, a result which was not enough to advance beyond the group stage. Colombia has also had success at the Bolivarian Games, winning four of the five women's football titles contested.

=== FIFA Women's World Cup ===
Colombia made its debut at the 2011 FIFA Women's World Cup in Germany, having qualified after finishing runner-up at the 2010 South American Women's Football Championship. Drawn in a group alongside Sweden, the United States and North Korea, the team lost its opening match to Sweden and was later defeated by the United States, finishing bottom of the group and the tournament overall.

Colombia returned to the World Cup in 2015 in Canada, having qualified as runner-up at the 2014 Copa América Femenina. Drawn against France, England and Mexico, the team opened the tournament with a 1–1 draw against Mexico, in which Daniela Montoya scored what is recognised as the first goal by a Colombian team at a Women's World Cup. Colombia then recorded its first-ever World Cup win, beating France 2–0 with goals from Lady Andrade and Catalina Usme, before losing to England. The result was enough to advance to the round of 16 as one of the best third-placed teams, where Colombia was eliminated by the eventual champions, the United States.

At the 2023 FIFA Women's World Cup in Australia and New Zealand, Colombia reached the quarter-finals for the first time, the best result in the team's history, before being eliminated. The team subsequently secured qualification for the 2027 FIFA Women's World Cup, marking a fourth World Cup appearance.

=== Copa América Femenina ===
Colombia has reached the final of the Copa América Femenina on three occasions without winning the title, being runner-up in 2010 and 2014, both held in Ecuador and decided by round-robin standings rather than a single final, and again in 2022, when the tournament was hosted in Colombia. The 2022 final was played at the Estadio Alfonso López in Bucaramanga before more than 20,000 spectators, with Colombia losing 1–0 to Brazil, the tournament's dominant side, which had won seven of the previous eight editions. Colombia reached the final again in 2025, again facing Brazil, and lost the title on penalties after a scoreless draw in normal time.

=== Olympic Games ===
Colombia has appeared at the women's football tournament of the Summer Olympics on three occasions, in 2012, 2016 and 2024, and had secured qualification for 2028. The team was eliminated in the group stage in both London 2012 and Rio 2016. At the 2024 Summer Olympics in Paris, Colombia advanced past the group stage for the first time, finishing third in a group with France, Canada and New Zealand before losing to defending world champions Spain in the quarter-finals on penalties following a 2–2 draw.

=== Nickname ===
The national team is commonly known as Las Chicas Superpoderosas ("The Powerpuff Girls"), a nickname derived from the American animated television series, alongside Las Cafeteras, a reference to Colombia's coffee production.

== See also ==
- Colombia women's national football team
- Colombian Women's Football League
- Copa América Femenina
