= History of the Department of Antioquia =

The History of the Department of Antioquia began with the arrival of the first human settlers into what is now the Antioquia Department in Colombia. These first settlers are presumed to have arrived from mesoamerica in Central America, some 10,500 years BC, although there is some evidence of human vestiges that may date to 22,000 years BC.

Upon the arrival of the Spanish during the 15th century what is now Antioquia Department was populated by numerous indigenous tribes, especially the Caribs, which according to archaeological findings began to extend their territory through the Caribbean region of the Antioquia Department and then moved south through the Cauca and Magdalena valleys. Not much is known with certainty about the Carib culture because the Spanish considered any indigenous group in the area that used bows and poisoned arrows and practiced cannibalism and sodomy to be Carib.

Two groups in the Carib family were predominant in Antioquia Department: the Catíos and the Nutabes that inhabited the region between the Cauca River and Porce River, as well as the Valley of Aburrá, and the Tahamíes, who inhabited the region between the Porce River and the Magdalena River.

The region of the Gulf of Urabá was inhabited by Urabáes and the Guna, who belonged to the Chibchan speaking nations. In previous centuries, a different tribe, the Quimbayas, not related to the Caribs or Chibchas, inhabited certain areas of southern Antioquia Department, in what are now the municipalities of Abejorral and Sonsón, but are presumed to have disappeared in the 10th century AD.

== Spanish conquest ==
The first group of Spanish to discover what is now Antioquia Department was headed by Spanish conqueror Rodrigo de Bastidas who entered through the Darién region in 1500. Ten years later the Spanish conqueror Alonso de Ojeda entered with another group of Spanish conquerors and founded the village of San Sebastián de Urabá which function as a "business center" for the Spanish, this village was substituted later in duties with the village of Panama because of the constant attacks that received from the indigenous tribes. San Sebastian de Uraba ruins are now located within the municipality of Necoclí, Antioquia Department.

The first incursions inland by the Spanish in what is now Antioquia did not start until 1536, when Jorge Robledo, Captain and Marshal of the Spanish monarchy organized an expedition by orders of the monarchy in 1541 and went to discover the Valley of Aburrá and founded the village of Antioquia, but after a few changes was finally settled in 1546 on what is now the village of Santa Fe de Antioquia. The Spanish ignored the terrain and vegetation while the indigenous tribes became their enemies, clashing in numerous battles, after the Spanish attacked them.

The territory of present-day Antioquia was baptized as Province of Antioquia and pertained to the Spanish Empire. Its first governorship was created by order of the King of Spain in 1569.

In 1675 the settlement of Medellín was proclaimed a village by the then governor of the province of Antioquia, captain general and governor Don Miguel de Aguinaga. The last governor before the Independence from Spain was Don Francisco de Ayala.

== Mon y Velarde: Reformer of Antioquia ==
In 1785 the governor of Antioquia, Francisco Silvestre, demanded the presence of the auditor Juan Antonio Mon y Velarde, due to the crisis the province of Antioquia was going through. While visiting as judge, Mon y Velarde introduced several reforms that were criticized by the general population. Among his reforms were the reorganization of rental income from alcohol and tobacco, a new mining code that substituted the one governor Gaspar de Rodas had expedited in the 16th century, authorized the use of silver instead of gold for transactions and changed the agrarian structure of Antioquia which allowed the foundation of new villages, he also opposed that large amounts of land were maintained in possession by few individuals that did not dully exploited them.
