= Caracolí =

- Municipality and town
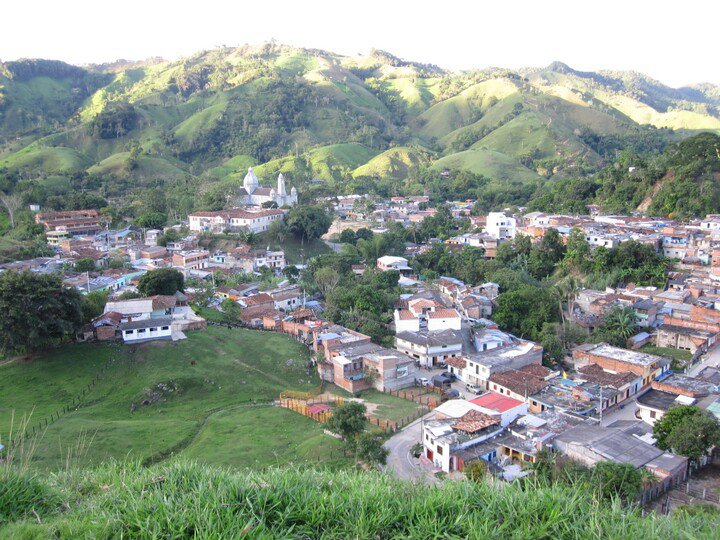

- Flag

- Location of the municipality and town of Caracolí in the Antioquia Department of Colombia

- Location in Colombia
- Coordinates: 6°24′42.98″N 74°45′38.16″W
- Country: Colombia
- Department: Antioquia Department
- Subregion: Magdalena Medio
- Time zone: UTC-5 (Colombia Standard Time)

Caracolí is a town and municipality in Antioquia Department, Colombia, It has an extension of 260 km^{2}. It has unique woodlands, with many species of animals and plants.

== History ==
It was founded in 1866.

== Economy ==
- Tourism
