= Plaza Mayor, Medellín =

Convention center in Medellín, Colombia

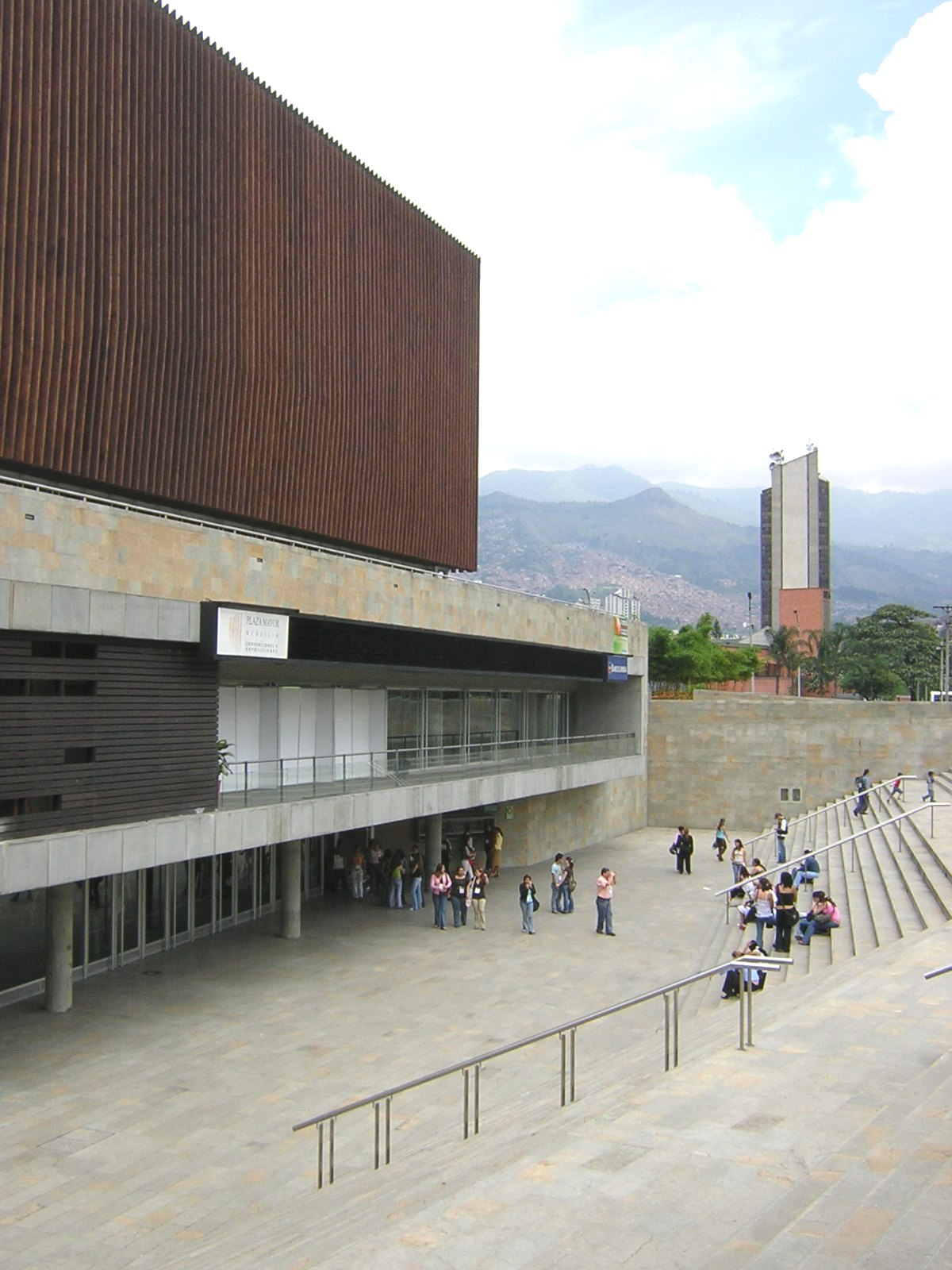
Entrance to the convention center

Plaza Mayor Medellín Conventions and Exhibitions is the international convention and exhibition center of Medellín and is one of the most modern in Colombia, having opened in 2006. It is located in the Alpujarra district and has 21 meeting rooms, space for 3000 people, and 280 parking spaces. Today, it houses major events such as Colombiatex and ColombiaModa, the country's most important annual fashion trade show.

== History ==
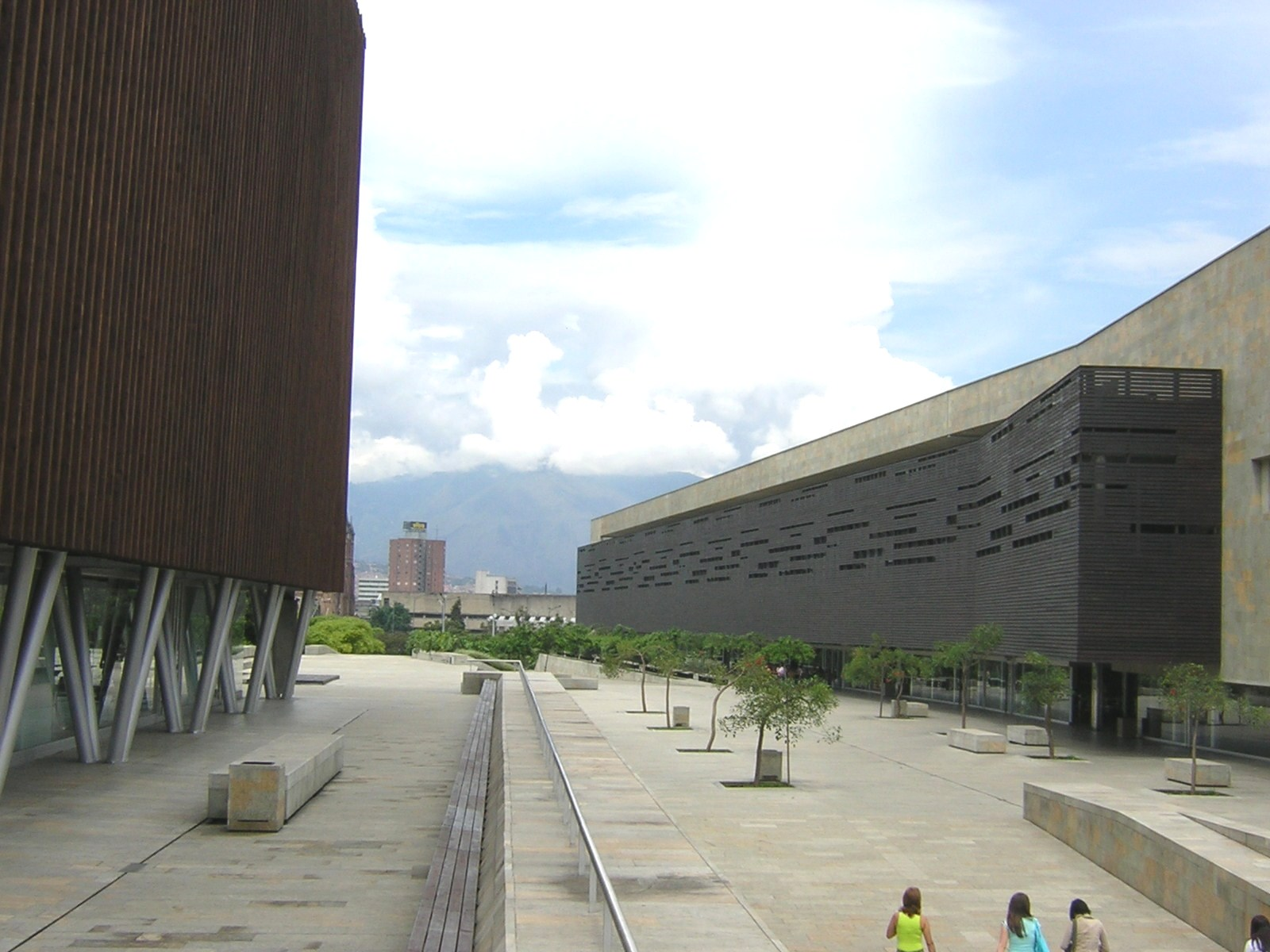
Plaza Mayor

The predecessor to Plaza Mayor was Palacio de Exposiciones y Convenciones de Medellín S.A. This enterprise was inaugurated on August 21, 1975, in order to showcase the industrial strength and commercial attractiveness of Antioquia and Colombia as a whole.

In 2001 the Municipality of Medellín, the National Federation of Coffee Growers of Colombia, the Chamber of Commerce of Medellín for Antioquia, and the IDEA agreed to provide financial and physical resources for the construction of the convention center, taking the first step towards the consolidation of Plaza Mayor Medellin. It was agreed that the objective of the project was to promote the realization of modern business and commercial activities, creating spaces for holding events and conventions with national and international actions to complement the competitiveness and internationalization of Medellin and foster a culture of citizenship.

== ColombiaModa ==
ColombiaModa is a showcase event that features catwalk shows, retails booths, and over 450 exhibitors, and is the most important annual fashion fixture in South America. It takes place at the Plaza Mayor every in August of every year.

== See also ==
- La Alpujarra Administrative Center
