= Juan José Florián =

Colombian paracyclist and former para swimmer

Personal information
- Full name: Juan José Florián Valencia
- Born: c. 1982 (age 43–44) Puerto Berrío, Antioquia, Colombia
- Military career
- Allegiance: FARC; Government of Colombia
- Service years: c. 1998–1999 (FARC); 2000–? (Government)

Sport
- Sport: Para swimming, para cycling
- Disability class: S5 (swimming), C1 (cycling)
- Coached by: Francisco Rodríguez Maldonado

Juan José Florián Valencia (born c. 1982) is a Colombian paracyclist and former para swimmer. He was the national record holder in multiple S5 swimming events, and won the road race and time trial cycling events at the 2021 Colombian National Championships. Florián fought for both sides in the Colombian conflict.

== Early life ==
Florián is from Puerto Berrío, Antioquia, Colombia, and grew up in Lejanías, Meta. At the age of 16, Florián was conscripted into the Revolutionary Armed Forces of Colombia (FARC), after his brother had joined the Colombian Government forces. He was one of an estimated 6,000 child soldiers enlisted by FARC. He fled FARC a year later, and joined the Colombian government army in 2000, when he was of legal age to enlist. After leaving the army, his brother developed schizophrenia.

In 2011, Florián was injured by an explosive device left by FARC on his doorstep, disguised as a package. He lost both arms and part of his right leg. He was in a coma for 12 days, and now uses a prosthesic limb.

In 2016, Florián started studying psychology at Sergio Arboleda University. After three semesters, he postponed his course to focus on his sports career. He is nicknamed "Mochoman". Florián is a member of the Fundación Colombianitos, which tackles child and youth poverty.

== Sports career ==
Florián started competing in para swimming in Bogotá. He competed in the S5 swimming events, and was national record holder in multiple events. In 2013, he won a medal in an event at the University of Minnesota in the US, and his last swimming medal was at the 2015 Colombian Championships. In total, he won 12 gold medals at events. He gave up swimming when he began studying.

In 2017, Florián started cycling on a specially adapted bike. He competes in C1 classification events, which is for riders with the most severe impairments. He uses his undamaged left leg to pedal the bike. Florián trains with Francisco Rodríguez Maldonado, who came third at the 1985 Vuelta a España.

Florián's first international cycling event was in Emmen, Netherlands in July 2017. He came 14th in the time trial event, and 13th in the road race. In 2018, he competed in multiple Cycling World Cup events. In 2019, Florián was sponsored by Movistar Colombia. He was the second paracyclist to be sponsored by the company. In 2021, he funded his own travel to a World Cup event in Portugal.

Florián was not selected for the delayed 2020 Summer Paralympics. In November 2021, he won the Colombian National Championships road race and time trial events. He won both events by almost two minutes. In August 2022, Florián cycled 482 kilometres (300 mi) over two days during the Siempre Santander Challenge.
