= Magdalena Medio Province =

- Province
- Country: Colombia
- Department: Bolívar
- Time zone: UTC−05:00 (COT)

The Magdalena Medio Province is a subregion of Bolívar Department, Colombia. It is part of the Middle Magdalena Valley and is continuous with the Magdalena Medio subregion of the adjacent Antioquia Department.
