= Yondó =

- Municipality and town
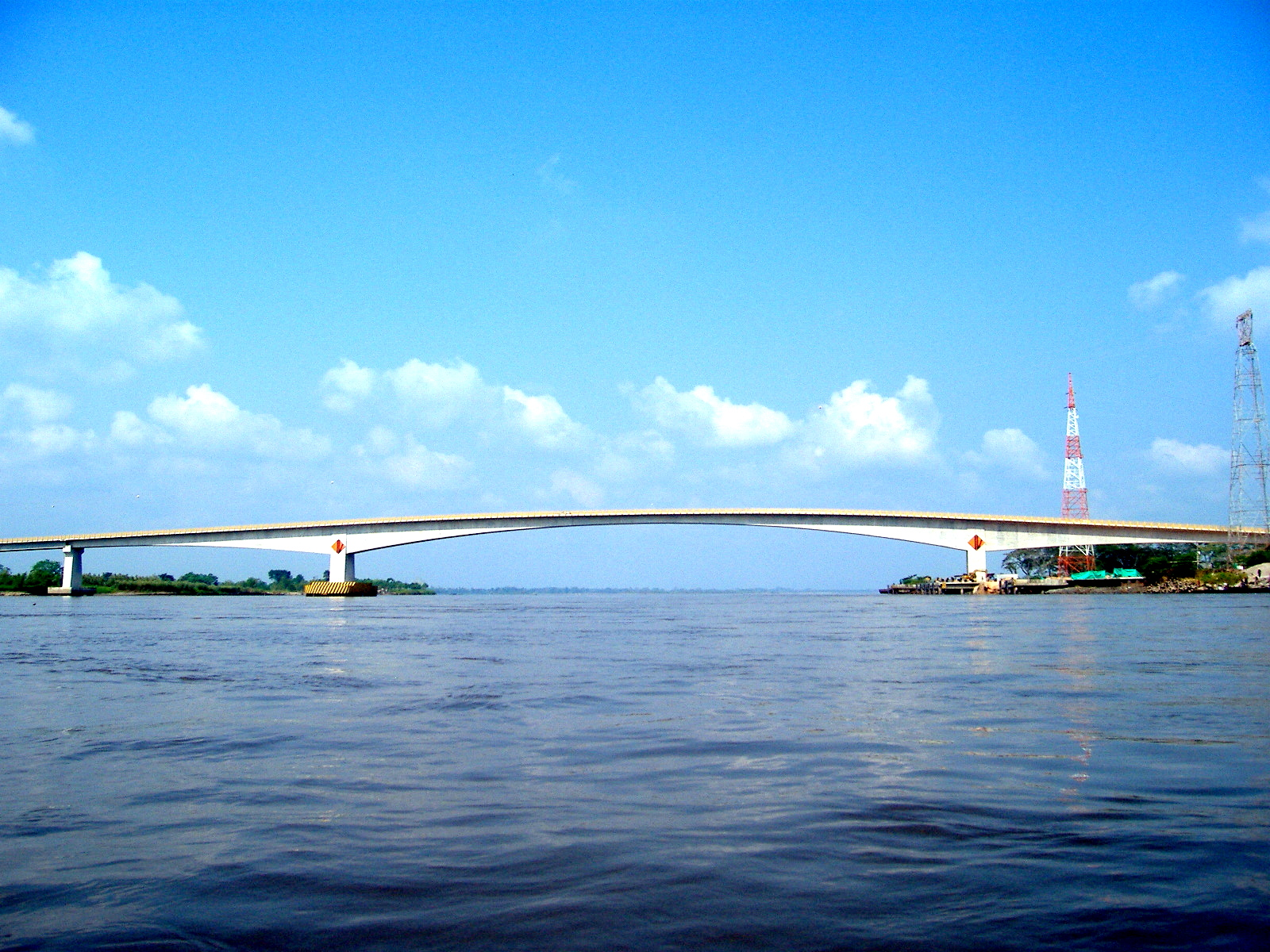

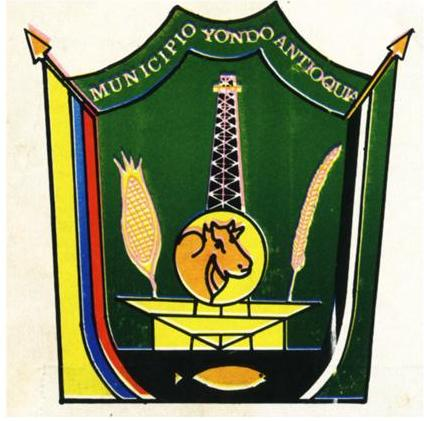
- Flag Coat of arms

- Location of the municipality and town of Yondó in the Antioquia Department of Colombia

- Location in Colombia
- Coordinates: 7°00′28″N 73°54′51″W
- Country: Colombia
- Department: Antioquia Department
- Subregion: Magdalena Medio

Population (Census 2018)
  - Total: 17,597
- Time zone: UTC-05:00 (Colombia Standard Time)

Yondó is a town and municipality in Antioquia Department, Colombia. It is part of the Magdalena Medio Antioquia sub-region.

The first settlers arrived around 10,000 BC; archaeological site. The town was founded in 1941 to lodge the, at that time, discovered Casabe oilfield's engineers and workers of Shell Colombia S.A.(SCSA) Subsidiary of Royal Dutch Shell. The town became a municipality in 1979. It is a Magdalena river port, across a river from Barrancabermeja, where Colombia's oldest and largest oil refinery is located.

== Statistics ==
- 07° 00' 28" latitude North; 73° 54' 51" longitude West; 75 m a.s.l. altitude
- Surface area 1,903 km²:
  - 30.2% natural forests, mostly secondary
  - 55.1% pastures
  - 10.6% secondary growth
- Annual rainfall 2,799 mm, no month below 100 mm; mean temperature year around 27.2 °C
- Total population 12,562; ca. 50% urban in the town seat, 50% rural

== History ==
Yondó was an oilfield's worker camp built by the Royal Dutch Shell oil company in 1945 in order to house some 2,000 workers and engineers. It was built in the usual Royal Dutch manner for camps in remote locations: with large comfortable modern houses, plenty of potable water, electricity, air conditioning, theater, social club with many amenities including olimpic pool, basquetball court, 18 hole golf course, bowling alley, large soccer field sewage system, schools, small hospital with many specialists, bilingual school, a small refinery to supply gasoline to domestic vehicles, excellent well maintained roadways, landing strip for small planes, radio and telephone communications, etc. These were (and would be today) considered luxuries and attracted -as many enclave developments in remote areas do- a large number of settlers in the periphery of the oil production facilities. The oil company had acquired rights for a 40 year exploitation of the oil fields, until 1985 but resigned in 1981 under pressure from FARC terrorist and invaders. The production facilities and camp installations were turned in to the government and were mostly ransacked and destroyed by thieves. This latter were destined to house bona fide and opportunist settlers and thus the new town was founded.

== Sister city ==
Yondó has sister city relations with:

- Berkeley, California

== Notes ==
1. The area is given as 1,881 km^{2} by the Antioquia Department Planning Agency while the Colombian National Geographic Institute states it as 1,903 km^{2}. There are also minor differences in altitude, urban area, etc.
2. Amparo Murillo Posada, Maria Teresa Arcila Estrada, Manuel Alberto Espinal, Giovani Restrepo Orrego, Gloria Estella Bonilla. 1994. Un mundo que se mueve como el río. Historia regional del Magdalena Medio. Instituto Colombiano de Antropología (ICANH), Bogotá.
