= Monumento a la Raza (Medellín) =

Monument in Medellín, Colombia

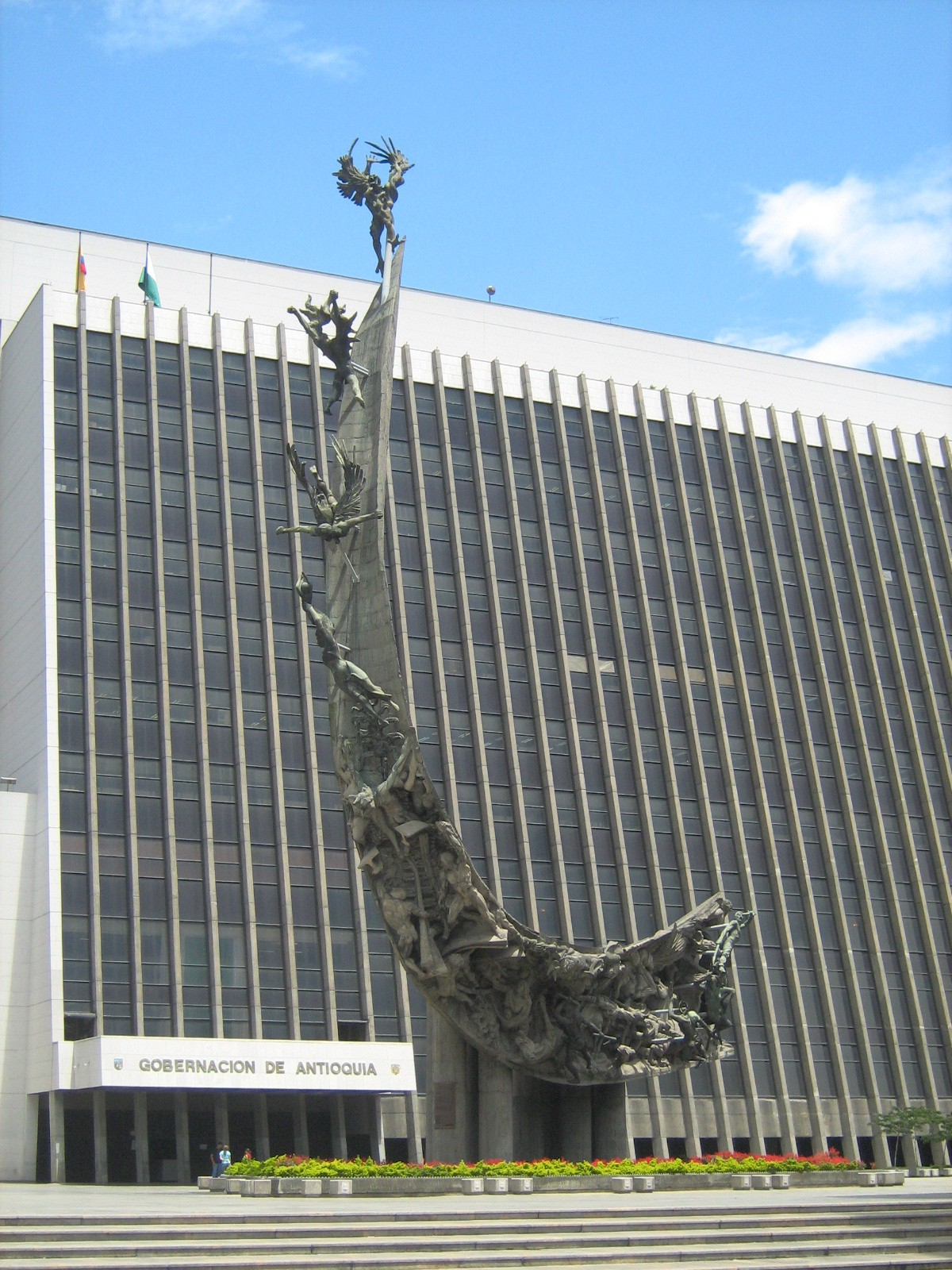
- The monument in 2008
- Interactive map of Monumento a la Raza
- Location: Medellín, Colombia
- Coordinates: 06°14′40″N 75°34′24″W
- Designer: Rodrigo Arenas Betancourt
- Material: Concrete and bronze
- Height: 38 meters (125 ft)
- Weight: 900 metric tons (890 long tons; 990 short tons)
- Opening date: 31 May 1988
- Restored date: 2025
- Dedicated to: La Raza Antioqueña

The Monumento a la Raza, also known as Monumento a la Raza Antioqueña, is an outdoor sculpture and monument in the city of Medellín, Antioquia, Colombia. Made of concrete and bronze, and it was created by Colombian sculptor Rodrigo Arenas Betancourt (1919–1995) and was inaugurated in the central square of the La Alpujarra Administrative Center on 31 May 1988.

The monument consists of a curved concrete structure adorned with numerous bronze sculptures symbolizing Antioquian identity and culture. In 2016, an urn containing a portion of Arenas' remains was placed next to the monument.

== History and construction ==
The Medellin government approved the erection of a monument honoring La Raza on 4 September 1975. The Colombian sculptor Rodrigo Arenas Betancourt sought to capture the culture and people of Antioquia through the monument. The base was constructed using plaster and concrete.

It was inaugurated on 31 May 1988, and was blessed by cardinal Alfonso López Trujillo. During the inauguration, Arenas stated:

"We are inaugurating this monument to Antioquia in grim times of immense, intense and far-reaching sorrow; times in which the motherland is being dismembered, inexorably mutilated, submerged in destruction and cannibalism." (Note: Original text in Spanish: "Nos toca inaugurar este monumento a Antioquia en momentos aciagos de inmenso, intenso y extenso dolor; momentos en que la patria se va desmembrando, se va mutilando inexorablemente, sumergida en la destrucción y el canibalismo".)

During the 203rd anniversary of the Independence of Antioquia in August 2016, Arenas was honored, and portion of his remains was placed in an urn installed beside the monument.

=== Status ===
The monument is exposed to multiple contaminants, including air pollution, moss, and pigeons and their feces, with visible damage to the naked eye. In August 2016, then-governor of Antioquia Luis Pérez Gutiérrez announced a restoration, but as of April 2018 it had not been conducted.

The monument received restoration works in 2025.

== Description and interpretation ==
The Monumento a la Raza stands 38 meters (125 ft) tall and weights 900 metric tons (890 long tons; 990 short tons). The Museo Universitario de Artes Digitales described it as a brown curved sculpture pointing towards the sky. According to the museum, the monument symbolizes the Antioquian culture, including its agriculture, religion, and spirit of solidarity. The museum also interpreted the work as a reflection of Arenas' early life in the Antioquian farmlands. Andrés Carvajal López, from the EAFIT University, said it portraits the story of the people who came out of the mud attempting to reach the top, starting from the bottom and trying to reach divinity in the zenith. María Elena Quintero, poet and widow of Arenas, said:

"He interpreted and created an epic in concrete and bronze, telling the story of Antioquia—its trades, its mythology, and more. The work is shaped like a horseshoe set on a pedestal, and within that form unfolds the development, colonization, and history of the Paisa people." (Note: Original text in Spanish: "[...] Él interpretó e hizo una epopeya de concreto y bronce, donde contó la historia de Antioquia, como los oficios, la mitología, entre otros. Esta obra es una herradura que está en un pedestal y dentro de esa forma se desarrolla el desarrollo, colonización e historia paisa".)

== Reception ==
Sarah Woods described the Monumento a la Raza as a "powerful [and] robust" work that depicts "the forces of good and evil".

== Gallery ==
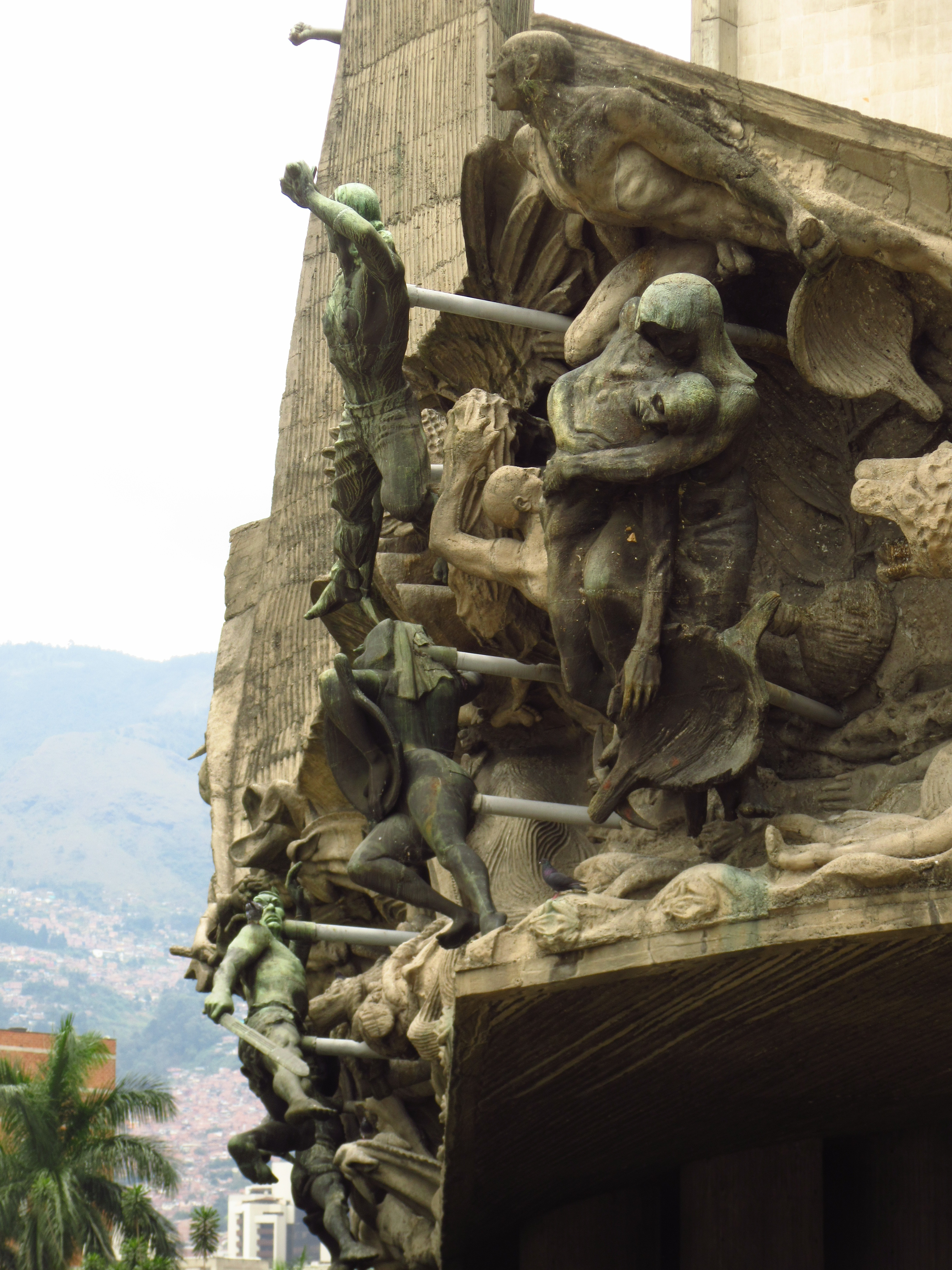
Detail of the lower part of the monument in 2018. The ambient damage is visible in some sculptures.

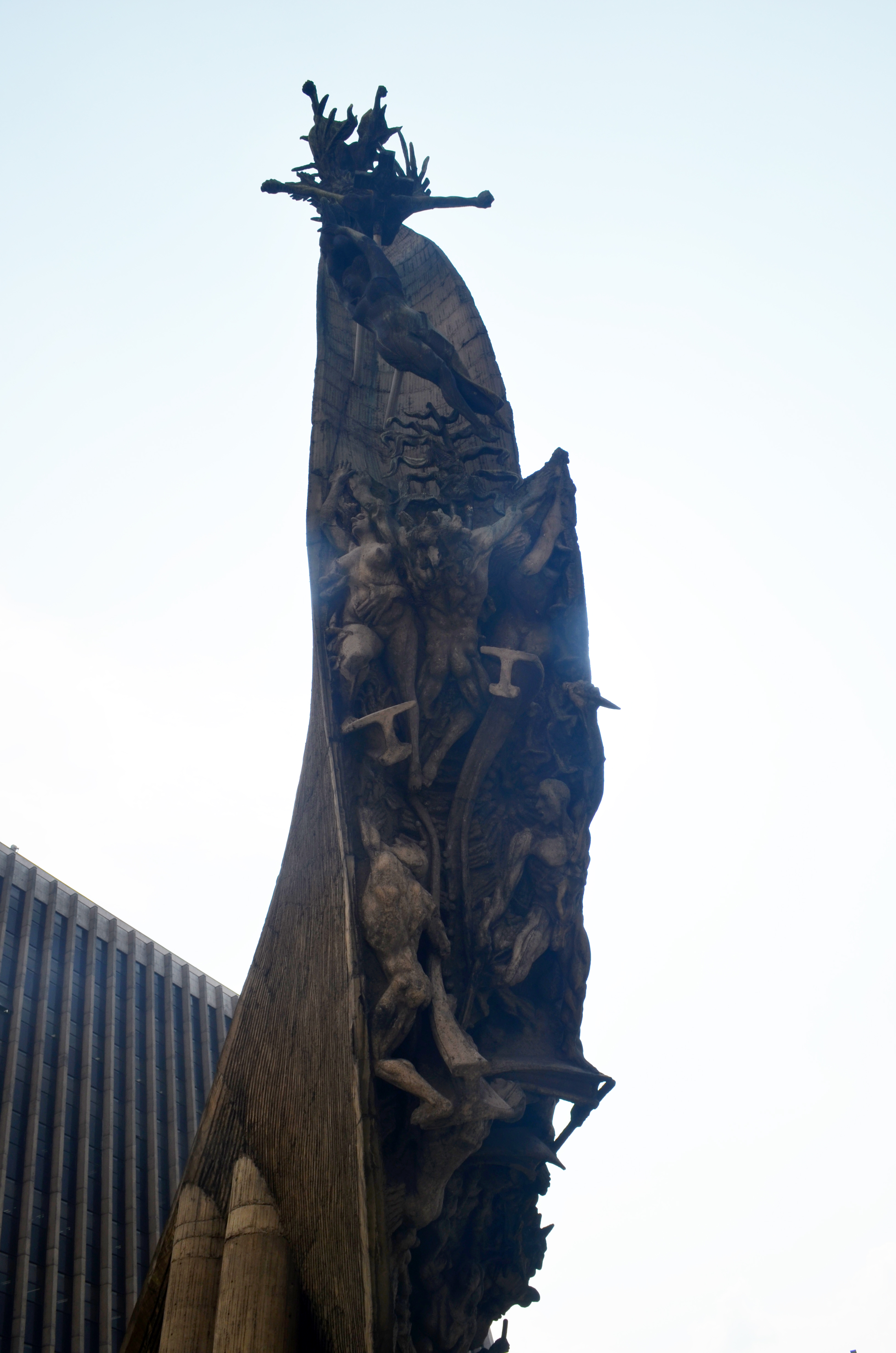
Detail of the top of the monument

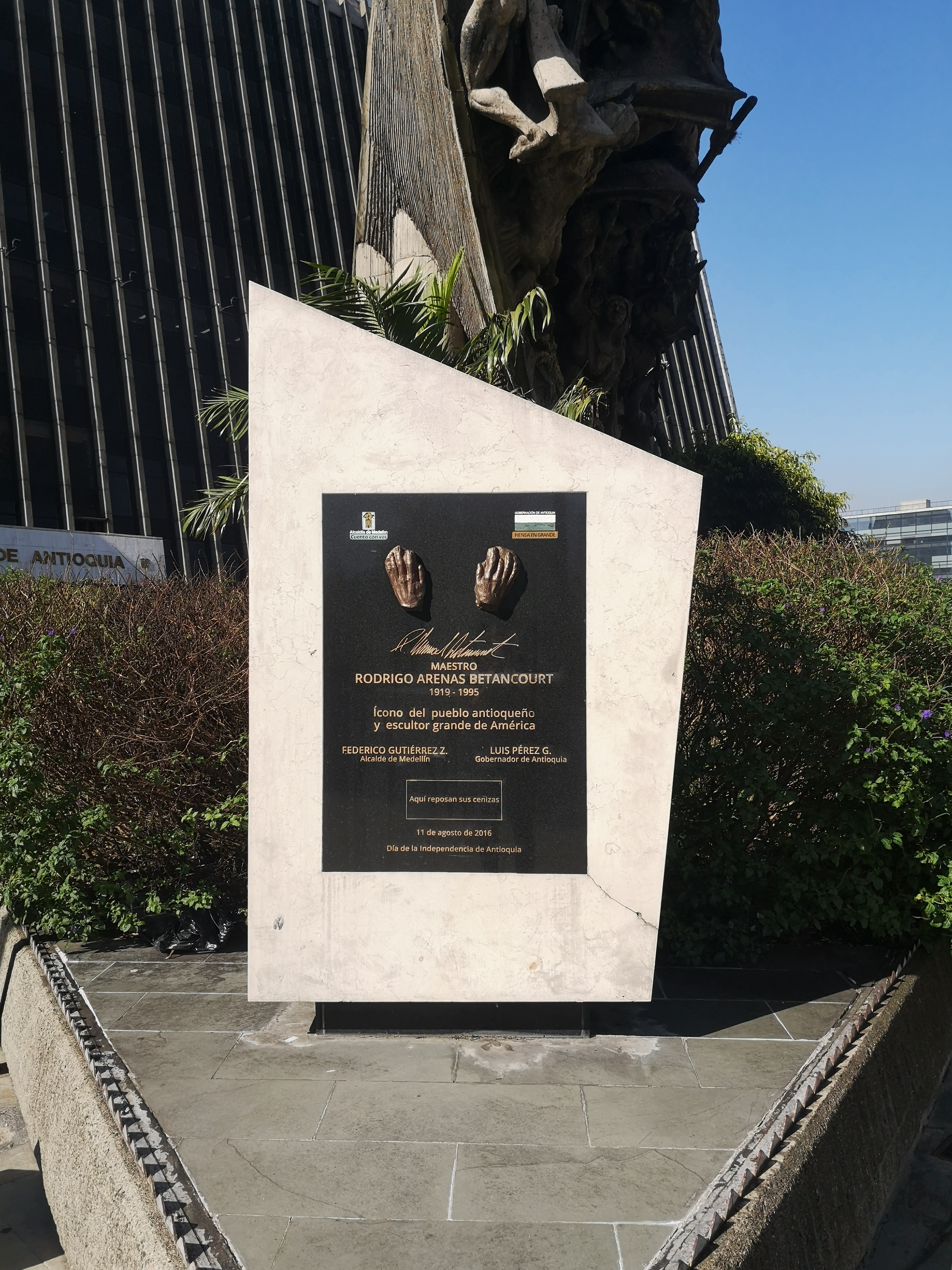
The urn containing Arenas' remains
