= Maceo, Antioquia =

- Municipality and town
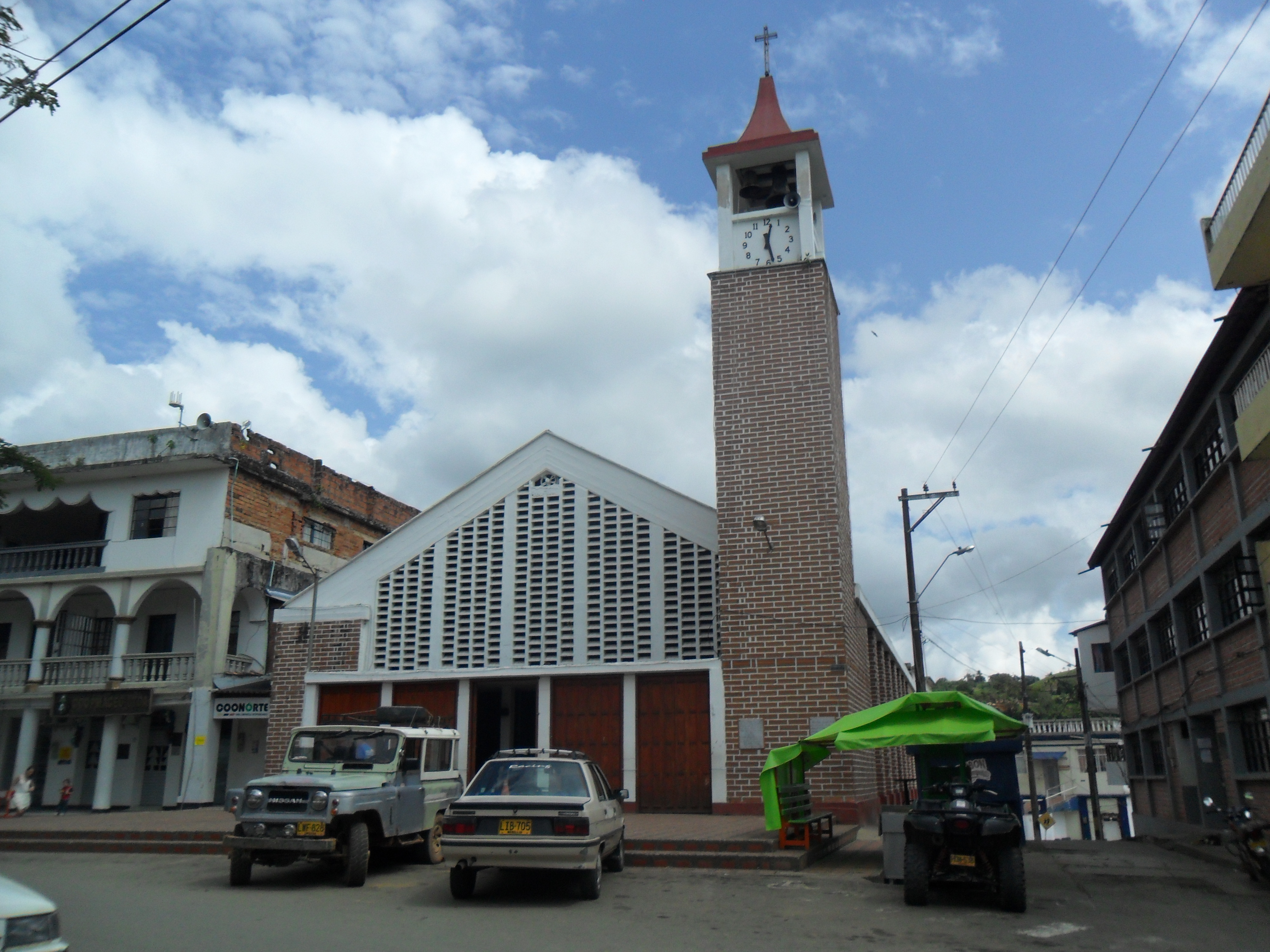

- Flag

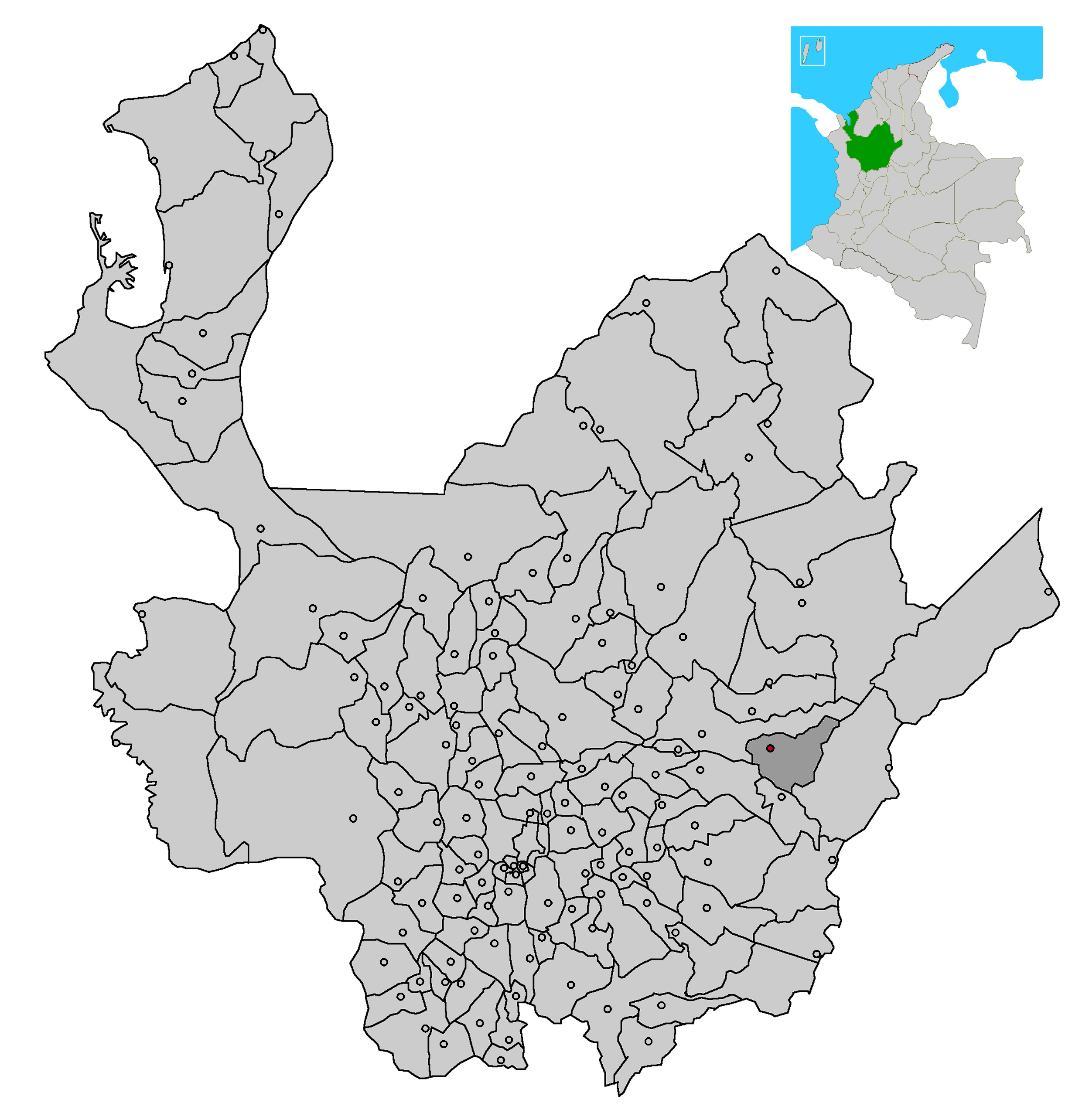
- Location of the municipality and town of Maceo, Antioquia in the Antioquia Department of Colombia

- Location in Colombia
- Coordinates: 6°22′0″N 74°47′0″W
- Country: Colombia
- Department: Antioquia Department
- Subregion: Magdalena Medio
- Time zone: UTC-5 (Colombia Standard Time)

Maceo is a town and municipality in the Colombian department of Antioquia. It is part of the Magdalena Medio Antioquia sub-region.
