= Monument to Effort =

Sculpture

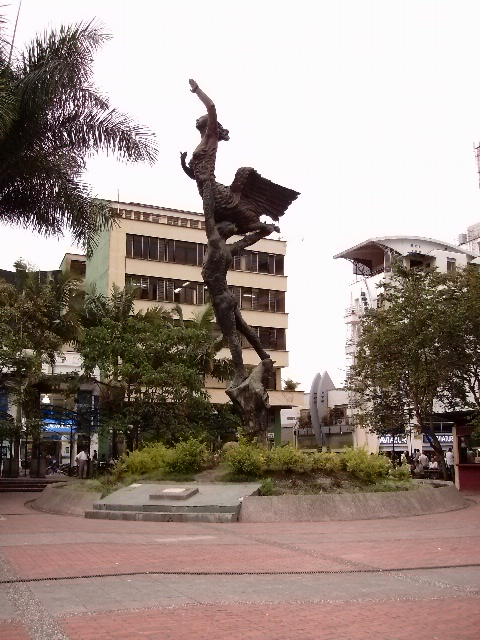
Monument to Effort, bronze, steel and concrete, 28 m height, Armenia, Colombia

The Monument to Effort or Monumento al Esfuerzo is a large sculpture realized by Colombian artist Rodrigo Arenas Betancur in the department of Quindío (Colombia) as a memorial for the foundation of the city and the antioquian colonisation that made it possible.

This monument is inspired by the painting Horizontes of antioquian artist Francisco Antonio Cano, that depicts a couple of peasants who point to unknown lands in the horizon, where they hope to colonize. The monument represents the strong will of the first inhabitants of the area who arrived to this selvatic location to start a settlement with their families, looking for news options of survival and escaping the civil wars that affected the northern areas of the country during the 19th century.

It is a 28-meter high bronze sculpture and was dedicated in 1978. Its current location is in the main square of Armenia.
