= Rodrigo Arenas Betancourt =

Colombian sculptor

Rodrigo Arenas-Betancourt
- Born: Rodrigo Arenas Betancourt; 23 October 1919; El Uvital, near to Fredonia, Antioquia, Colombia
- Died: 14 May 1995 (aged 75); Medellín, Colombia
- Known for: sculptor
- Notable work: Vargas swamp lancers (1969); Nude Bolívar (1963); The Family (1984); Prometheus Bound (1968); Condor Bolívar (1991)
- Spouses: Celia Calderón de la Barca (m. 1950; died 1969) Lydia Rosas (m. 1970; div. 1974) María Elena Quintero (m. 1975)

Rodrigo Arenas Betancourt (23 October 1919 – 14 May 1995) was a Colombian sculptor. At the time of his death in 1995 he was recognized as one of the most important sculptors in Colombia and Latin America. Most of the major cities in Colombia have statues sculpted by Arenas Betancourt.

== Biography ==
=== Early life ===
Arenas was the son of a peasant couple from Antioquia. As a child, he helped his parents with farming in Fredonia, his hometown. After completing his primary education, he briefly attended the Yarumal Seminary of Missions between 1931 and 1932. Around 1938, he began developing his skills as a sculptor, carving wooden Christ figures and assisting other sculptors and muralists, such as Pedro Nel Gómez and Bernardo Vieco Ortiz, in the construction of their works.

=== Career ===
Arenas studied at the Institute of Fine Arts in Medellín and at the School of Fine Arts of the National University of Colombia in Bogotá between 1939 and 1941. In 1944, Arenas decided to settle in Mexico to pursue studies at the Academy of San Carlos and the La Esmeralda Free Art Association. During his time in Mexico, Arenas combined his studies in visual arts with work related to his artistic side. Also Arenas was a set design assistant at Azteca Estudios, a writer and columnist for print media, a sculptor, and an art photographer. Arenas was an art teacher at the Ciudadela School of Crafts in Mexico City, which he also co-founded.

Between 1959 and 1966, Arenas worked in the United States and then traveled to Europe, where he lived until the end of 1966. During his time on the continent, Arenas Betancourt also served as Minister Counselor at the Colombian Embassy in Italy. Upon returning to Colombia permanently in early 1967, he established his art studio in the municipality of Caldas (Antioquia), where he employed both novice and experienced artists. He also served as an artistic advisor to the University of Antioquia in his home country.

Throughout his career, he worked with a variety of materials, from drawings, portraits, and watercolors to monumental works that combined steel and concrete. He was also a skilled sculptor, utilizing plaster, wood, basalt, stone, bronze, and terracotta, among others. From the early 1950s onward, he began creating his larger works, generally commissioned by government entities and private companies, and some simply undertaken for his personal enjoyment. Additionally to sculpture, Arenas Betancourt worked in printmaking and book illustration.

Examples of his artwork are:

- Nude Bolívar in Pereira
- Monumento a la Raza, bronze and concrete, 38 m height, located in La Alpujarra Administrative Center in Medellín
- Sculptural Complex Vargas Swamp Lancers near Paipa is the largest sculpture in Colombia.
- Monument to Effort in Armenia
- Monument to the Marching Revolution in Valledupar
- Monument to the founders in Bogotá (installed 1965)

Cuauhtémoc, one of his great sculptures created between 1953 and 1954, 18 meters high and made of bronze and basalt, which was expressly commissioned by the Mexican government to be installed in the Building of the Ministry of Communications and Public Works (SCOP) of Mexico City, was irreparably damaged in the Mexico earthquake of 1985.

On 18 October 1987, Arenas was kidnapped by the FARC in Caldas (Antioquia), while traveling with his wife and children. He was released on 1 January 1988, after 81 days in captivity, after his family paid a large sum of money demanded by his kidnappers for his release, he dedicated himself to drawing in a notebook and writing about his experiences in captivity, which later formed the basis for his book, 'The Steps of the Condemned' (es:Los pasos del condenado).

=== Death ===
Arenas Betancourt died on 14 May 1995 in El Rosario Clinic in Medellín in 1995 from liver cancer. His remains rest in Fredonia. His ashes rest at the base of the torch of liberty carried on the right hand of the sculpture of the Nude Bolívar.

== Personal life ==
Arenas Betancourt was married twice. Celia Calderón de la Barca Olvera was his wife, a Mexican artist whom he married in 1950 and who was known for her engravings, oil paintings and watercolors, although their relationship ended tragically with her suicide in Mexico, an event that deeply impacted him. His second wife was Lydia Rosas, with whom he had two children: José Patricio, Rita Virginia and Margarita. His third wife was the poet María Elena Quintero, who accompanied him during the last 20 years of his life and is now the caretaker of his legacy.

== Gallery ==
His bronze statues are characterized by their enormous proportions and dramatic expression. He is considered one of the most prolific and highly regarded Colombian artists, both nationally and internationally. His works are characterized by their monumental scale, melodrama, and spectacular nature, many of which highlight prominent figures in Colombian history and their significant achievements. Many of his sculptures are public monuments, and almost his entire body of work can be found in various cities in Colombia and Mexico. Some works not intended for public display remain in Caldas (Antioquia) under the care of his wife, María Elena Quintero de Arenas, and their five children. He was a serial sculptor who primarily worked with bronze, concrete, and steel, although some of his early works also incorporated terracotta. He won the National Salon of Artists of Colombia Prize in 1975, awarded by the Colombian Institute of Culture (Colcultura).

Among his most outstanding works, which are currently on public display, are the following:

Sculture	Image	Date of construction	Heigh	Country	Location
Prometheus (and Quetzalcoátl)		1951–1952	7,7 M.	Faculty of Exact Sciences of the National Autonomous University of Mexico (UNAM)	Mexico City
The Prayer to the Outlaw		1957	3,6 M.	El Dorado International Airport	Bogotá, Colombia
Prometheus Bound		1957	2,5 M.	Facade of the Alternate Headquarters of the Museum of Antioquia	Medellín (Antioquia)
The Wounded Macaw		1959	2,5 M.	Concrete sculpture. Lomas de Cuernavaca subdivision Cuernavaca (Morelos)	México
Monumental heads of the heroes of the Mexican Revolution: Moreno, Hidalgo, Juárez and Zapata		1959–1960	2,5 M. each one	Different places	Mexico City
Nude Bolívar		1956–1962	10 M.	Bolivar Square Pereira	Pereira, Risaralda Department, Colombia
Tribute to General José María Córdova		1957–1964	6 M.	Main park, Rionegro	Rionegro, Antioquia, Colombia
Prometheus		1966	10 M.	Carrera 13 con Calle 13, Avenida Circunvalar	Pereira (Risaralda)
Long Journey from the Womb to the Heart of Fire		1964–1966	Two panels, each 3 x 8.5 m	Facade of the Antioquia Beneficence tower, Av. Sucre with Ayacucho, Medellín (Antioquia)	Medellín, Colombia
Christ Falling (Christ Prometheus)		1965–1968	6 M.	Central Courtyard of Block 16 of the University of Antioquia, Medellín (Antioquia)	Medellín, Colombia
Prometheus Bound		1967–1968	6 M.	Main Plaza of the Technological University of Pereira	Pereira, Colombia
The Flue player and the Dog		1969	1,6 M.	Concrete and plaster San Ignacio tower, University of Antioquia	Medellín, Colombia
Man, creator of Energy		1968–1970	18 M.	Bronze, steel and concrete, 18 m height, located in University of Antioquia, Medellín (Antioquia)	Medellín, Colombia
Vargas Swamp Lancers		1968–1971	33 M.	Bronze, steel and concrete, 33 m height, Paipa, Boyacá. It is the largest monument and/or sculpture in Colombia. It was declared a National Monument by Decree 1744 1 September 1975.	Paipa, Colombia
Monument to life		1971–1974	14 M.	Tower's square Suramericana de Seguros.	Medellín, Colombia
Monument in homage to Cacica Gaitana		1974	21 M.	Av. Circunvalar con Calle 4, Neiva (Huila	Neiva, Colombia
The Prometheus of Freedom (Monument to the Banana Plantations)		1974–1978	14 M.	This artwork was designed to be installed in Curaçao. It was ultimately installed in the Plaza de los Mártires, Ciénaga Magdalena	Ciénaga, Colombia
Monument to Effort		1978	12 M.	bronze, steel and concrete, 28 m height, Armenia, Colombia, Quindío Department	Armenia, Colombia
The Race Challenge		1980	18 M.	Headquarters of Banco Popular, Parque Berrío, Medellín (Antioquia)	Medellín, Colombia
The Creation		1981–1983	18 M.	Av. La Playa (Cl. 52) con Av. Oriental (Cr. 46) Edificio Vicente Uribe Rendón, Medellín (Antioquia)	Medellín, Colombia
Naked John Lennon		1981–1982	2,8 M.	This work was commissioned, and three original casts were made. One was located at the Posada Alemana in Salento, Quindío, commissioned by Carlos Lehder. Its whereabouts have been unknown since 2003, although it is believed to be in the possession of María Elena Quintero, Arenas' widow. Another is held in the family's private collection, and the last one is located at the entrance of the Hotel Nebraska in Doradal, a district of Puerto Triunfo, Antioquia.	Salento, Colombia
Monument to Porfirio Barba Jacob		1982–1983	5,5 M.	Main park, Santa Rosa de Osos, (Antioquia)	Antioquia, Colombia
The Family (The New Life)		1984	9 M.	Bronze and steel. It was originally designed to be part of the main park in Fredonia (Antioquia), but this idea never materialized. From 1986, it was located in the Monaco Tower in Medellín (Antioquia), a former residence owned by Pablo Escobar. It was dismantled in 2018, a few months before the building's demolition and its whereabouts have been unknown since 2025.	Medellín, Colombia
Christ the Liberator of Latin America or Liberty Christ		1978–1985	15 M.	Queen Mary Cathedral, Barranquilla	Barranquilla, Atlántico Department, Colombia
Monumento a la Raza		1988	38 M.	La Alpujarra Administrative Center	Medellín, Colombia
Brother Horse		1988	1,7 M. without a pedestal	La Alpujarra Administrative Center, El Poblado neighborhood, opposite the Vegas de Zúñiga housing development, Avenida Las Vegas con Calle 18C Sur, Medellín (Antioquia)	Medellín, Colombia
Bolívar Cóndor		1991	17 M.	Bronze and concrete, located in the main square of Manizales (Caldas)	Manizales, Colombia
The Revolution in Progress		1994	6,5 M.	Alfonso López square, Valledupar (Cesar Department)	Valledupar, Colombia
Monument to the Founders		1995	22 M.	Parque de los Fundadores, Villavicencio (Meta)	Villavicencio, Colombia
God Mercury		1997	1,5 M.	San Antonio station (Medellín), Medellín Metro	Medellín, Colombia
God Mercury			5 M.	Mercurio Plaza, between 5th and 6th Streets with 9th and 10th Avenues, in front of the Fenalco tower, Cali. Identical to the one located in Medellín except for its copper-colored finish and being mounted on a pedestal.	Cali, Colombia
The foals		1997	4 M.	Homage to José Eustasio Rivera. Av. La Toma con Carrera 2, Neiva (Huila)	Neiva, Colombia
The flute player and the Dancer		1997		Municipal Administrative Center, Itagüí (Antioquia)	Itagüí, Colombia
The flute player and the Dancer			3,5 M	Lleras Park, corner of the Calle 9A with Carrera 40, Medellín (Antioquia)	Itagüí, Colombia
The God Pan				Colombia	
El Juárez				México	Puebla
Christ without the Cross				Colombia	Pereira
El Águila que Cae				México	In front of the communications tower, México City
Cristo Moreno				Colombia	San Benito Abad, Sucre

== Bibliography ==
- Crónicas de la errancia, del amor y de la muerte. autobiographical essay, 1976
- Los pasos del condenado, 1988
- Memorias de Lázaro, 1994
- Una propia y definitiva expresión: conferencias y discursos, (posthumous) 1999
