= Porfirio Barba-Jacob =

Colombian poet and writer (1883–1942)

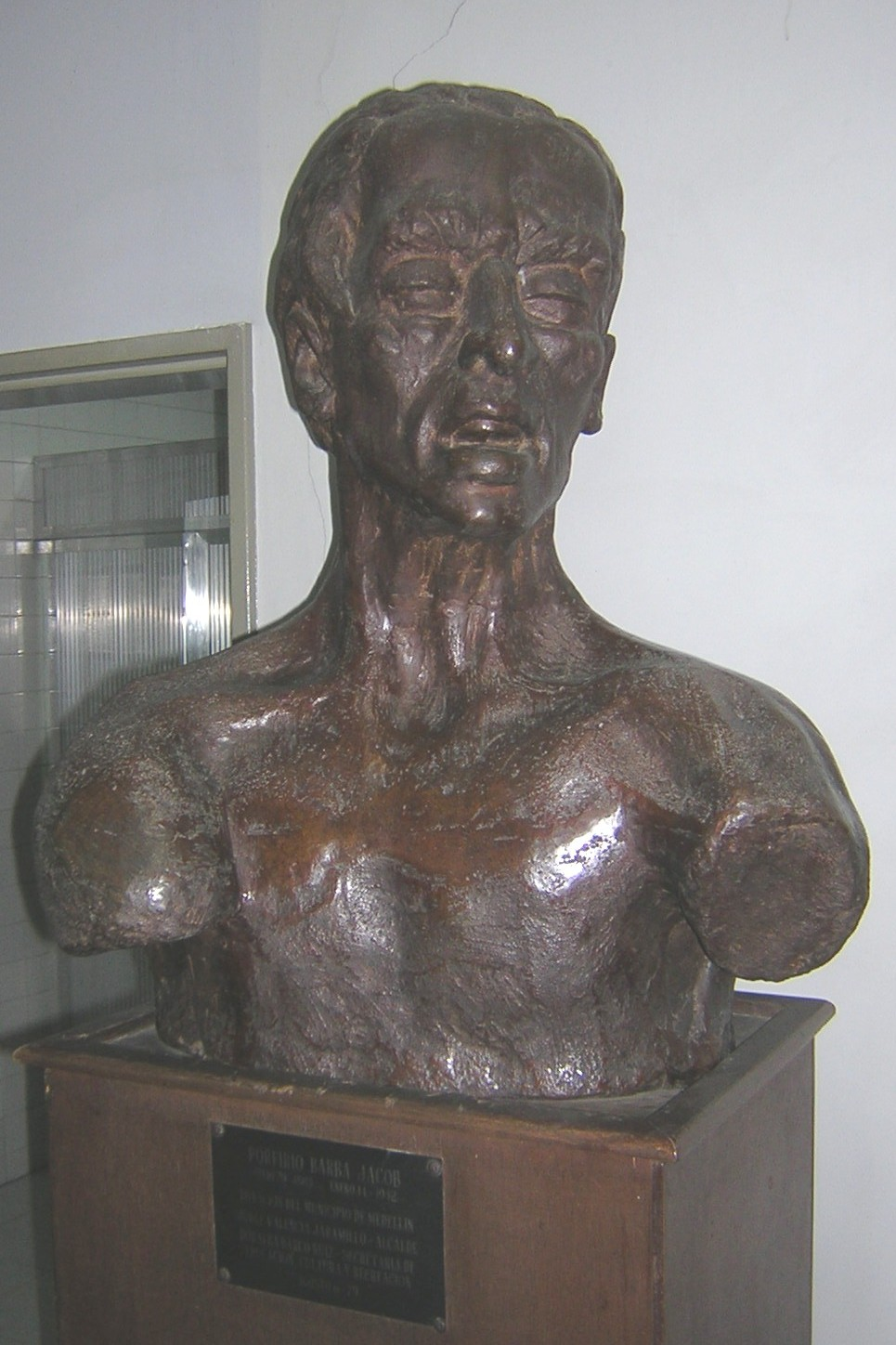
Bust of Porfirio Barba Jacob in the Pilot Public Library in Medellín, Colombia.

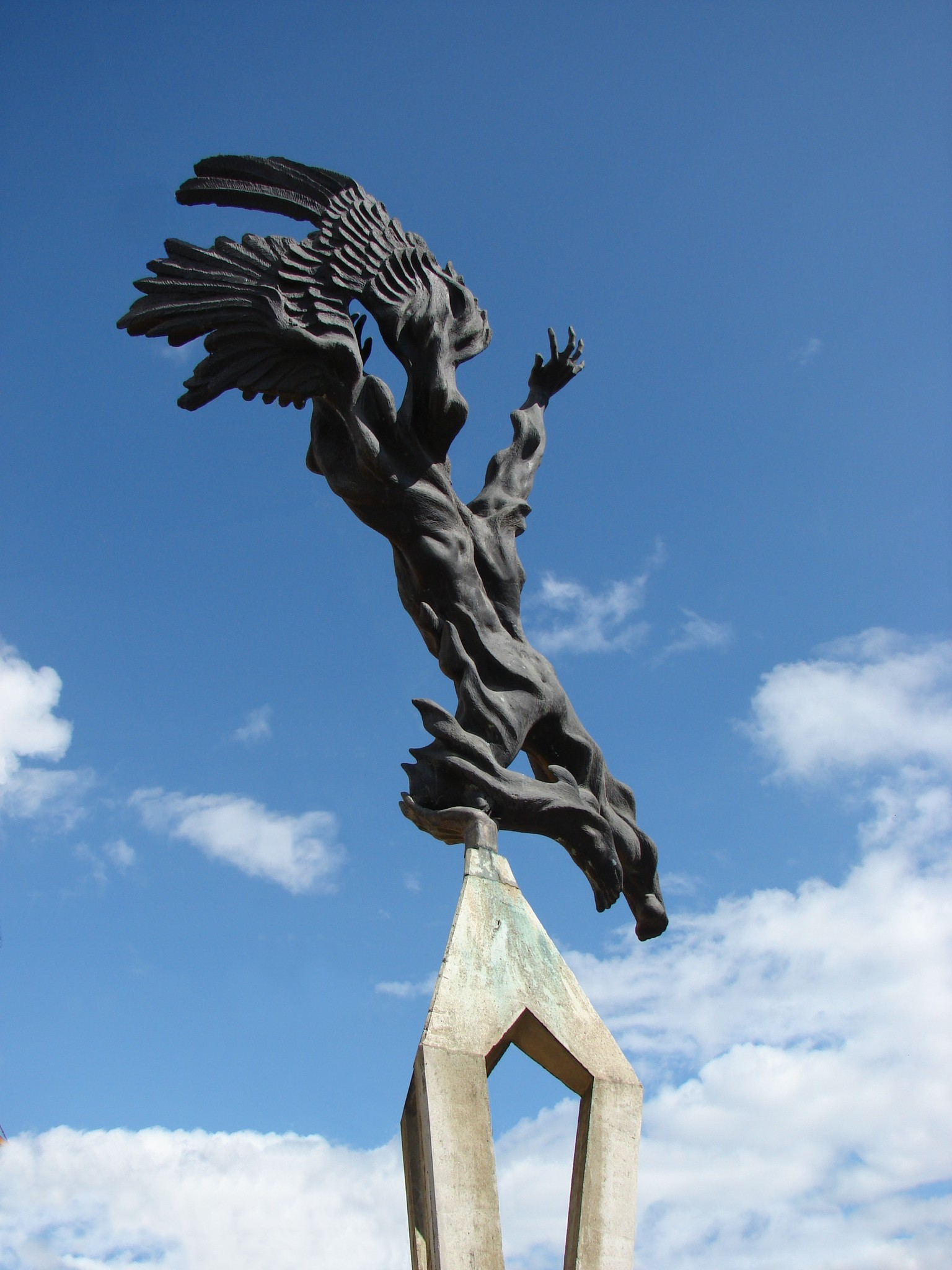
Bronze and concrete monument to Porfirio Barba Jacob in the central municipal park of Santa Rosa de Osos in Antioquia, Colombia. The sculpture is by Rodrigo Arenas Betancur.

Miguel Ángel Osorio Benítez (July 29, 1883 – January 14, 1942), better known by his pseudonym, Porfirio Barba-Jacob, was a Colombian poet and writer.

Born in Santa Rosa de Osos, Antioquia, to parents Antonio María Osorio and Pastora Benítez, he was raised by his grandparents in Angostura. In 1895 he started his travels, first through Colombia, and from 1907 to Central America and the United States, before finally settling down in 1930 in Mexico City.

Around 1902 in Bogotá, he founded the literary magazine "El cancionero antioqueño" (The Antioquian songbook), which he managed under the pseudonym Marín Jiménez. Short after, he wrote the novel "Virginia", which was never published because the original manuscript was confiscated by the mayor of Angostura for alleged immorality.

In 1906 he moved to Barranquilla where he adopted the pseudonym Ricardo Arenales. He continued to use this pseudonym until 1922 when in Guatemala he adopted a new pseudonym which he would use for the rest of his life: Porfirio Barba-Jacob. Around 1907, still in Barranquilla, he wrote his first poems, such as "Árbol viejo", "Campiña florida", and his most famous work, "Canción de la vida profunda" (Song of the deep life).

During his journey through Central America, Mexico and the US, he contributed to many magazines and journals. He befriended Porfirio Díaz, which led to his fleeing to Guatemala, then to Cuba, for disagreeing with Manuel Estrada.

In 1918 he returned to Mexico, where it is said that he wrote a biography of Pancho Villa. In 1922 he was expelled by Álvaro Obregón and fled again to Guatemala, from where he was again expelled in 1924 by Jorge Ubico. Barba-Jacob then went to El Salvador, and after being deported by Alfonso Quiñones, travelled to Honduras, New Orleans and Cuba. In 1927 he returned to Colombia and, after some recitals and contributions to the Colombian journal El Espectador, he left Colombia on what would be his last trip.

He died in 1942 of tuberculosis in Mexico City. Four years after his death, on 11 January 1946, his ashes were claimed by the Colombian government and were returned to the Rotonda de los Hombres Ilustres. During the course of his life, Barba-Jacob was openly gay.

== Main works ==
- Poemas intemporales
