= Caicedonia =

- Municipality and town
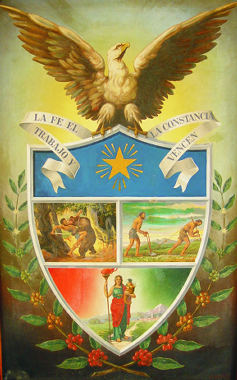
- Flag Coat of arms

- Location of the municipality and town of Caicedonia in the Valle del Cauca Department of Colombia.

- Location in Colombia
- Coordinates: 4°20′N 75°50′W
- Country: Colombia
- Department: Valle del Cauca Department
- Established: August 3, 1910

Area
  - Municipality and town: 167 km^{2} (64 sq mi)
  - Urban: 2.84 km^{2} (1.10 sq mi)

Population (2018 census)
  - Municipality and town: 28,825
  - Density: 173/km^{2} (447/sq mi)
  - Urban: 23,840
  - Urban density: 8,390/km^{2} (21,700/sq mi)
- Time zone: UTC-5 (Colombia Standard Time)
- Climate: Af

Caicedonia (Spanish pronunciation: [kajseˈðonja]) is a town and municipality located in the Department of Valle del Cauca, Colombia, situated about 172 km from the capital Cali. Founded in 1910 by Daniel Gutierrez, Juan Bautista Angely and a group of settlers from Antioquia, Caldas, and Tolima, it was named after Lisandro Caicedo and became a municipality in 1923. Mostly mountainous, its economy is based on agriculture and commerce, its main exports are corn, coffee, sugarcane and bananas. Given its location on the border with the Quindío Department, only 35 km from that department's capital, Armenia, Caicedonia belongs ethnographically and culturally to the Paisa region.

== Climate ==
Climate data for El Edén International Airport (Note: El Edén International Airport is located approximately 14 kilometres (8.7 mi) north-east of Caicedonia.), elevation 1,229 m (4,032 ft), (1981–2010)
Month	Jan	Feb	Mar	Apr	May	Jun	Jul	Aug	Sep	Oct	Nov	Dec	Year
Mean daily maximum °C (°F)	27.8 (82.0)	28.0 (82.4)	27.9 (82.2)	27.5 (81.5)	27.3 (81.1)	27.4 (81.3)	27.9 (82.2)	28.3 (82.9)	27.7 (81.9)	27.1 (80.8)	26.9 (80.4)	27.2 (81.0)	27.6 (81.7)
Daily mean °C (°F)	22.2 (72.0)	22.4 (72.3)	22.2 (72.0)	22.0 (71.6)	22.0 (71.6)	22.2 (72.0)	22.4 (72.3)	22.6 (72.7)	22.0 (71.6)	21.5 (70.7)	21.5 (70.7)	21.9 (71.4)	22.1 (71.8)
Mean daily minimum °C (°F)	16.6 (61.9)	16.7 (62.1)	16.8 (62.2)	17.1 (62.8)	17.3 (63.1)	16.9 (62.4)	16.6 (61.9)	16.5 (61.7)	16.5 (61.7)	16.6 (61.9)	16.7 (62.1)	16.8 (62.2)	16.7 (62.1)
Average precipitation mm (inches)	136.1 (5.36)	144.2 (5.68)	194.1 (7.64)	262.6 (10.34)	219.6 (8.65)	153.1 (6.03)	105.2 (4.14)	95.6 (3.76)	182.9 (7.20)	249.7 (9.83)	264.1 (10.40)	175.2 (6.90)	2,164.7 (85.22)
Average precipitation days	13	13	16	20	20	15	13	12	17	21	20	16	190
Average relative humidity (%)	80	79	80	82	83	82	79	77	80	82	82	81	80
Mean monthly sunshine hours	170.5	146.8	139.5	126.0	127.1	138.0	176.7	189.1	150.0	136.4	135.0	148.8	1,783.9
Mean daily sunshine hours	5.5	5.2	4.5	4.2	4.1	4.6	5.7	6.1	5.0	4.4	4.5	4.8	4.9
Source: Instituto de Hidrologia Meteorologia y Estudios Ambientales
