= La Alpujarra Administrative Center =

Government complex in Colombia

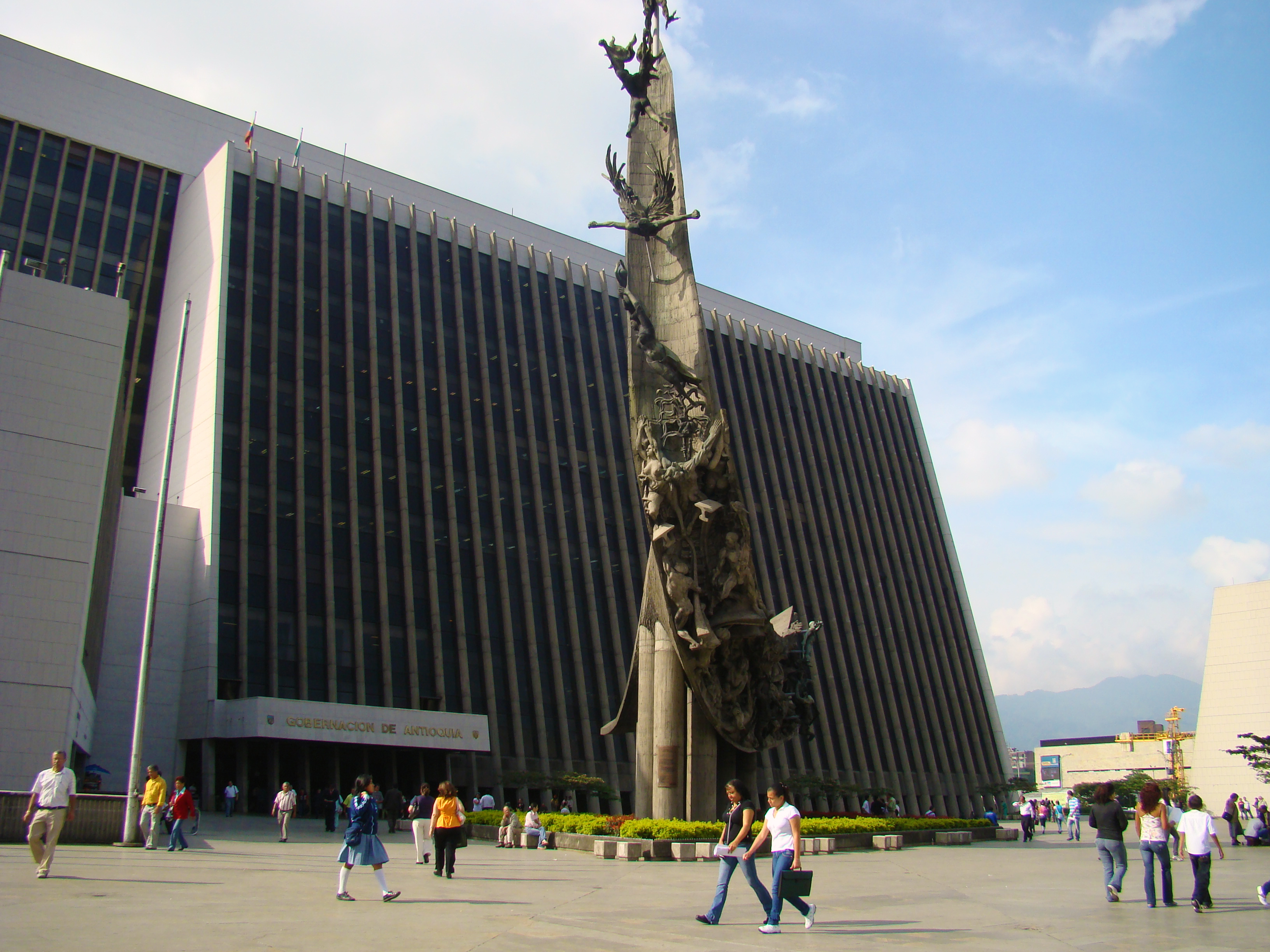
Monumento a la Raza by Rodrigo Arenas Betancourt.

La Alpujarra Administrative Center, officially known as the José María Córdova Administrative Center, is an urban complex of government buildings built in the 1980s for the administration of the Antioquia department and Medellín municipality. The center consists of two buildings separated by a plaza. This plaza includes the sculpture called Monumento a la Raza by Rodrigo Arenas Betancourt, in honor of the history of Antioquia.

Additional businesses in the area include the building of the Antioquia Departmental Business, the National Tax Administration, the National Palace (Spanish: Palacio de Justicia), the seat of Teleantioquia (a regional TV channel), and the former headquarters of the Antioquia Railway.

The La Alpujarra Administrative Center is located on the crossing of San Juan Avenue and Carabobo Street, and is near the EPM Intelligent Building. La Alpujarra Administrative Center was formerly called the "Railway Station". The Alpujarra station of the Medellín Metro is located in this area.

This location is a common area for civic activity and demonstrations.

== See also ==
- Plaza Mayor, Medellín
