= Sevilla, Valle del Cauca =

Coordinates: 4.26889°N 75.9361°W

- Municipality and town
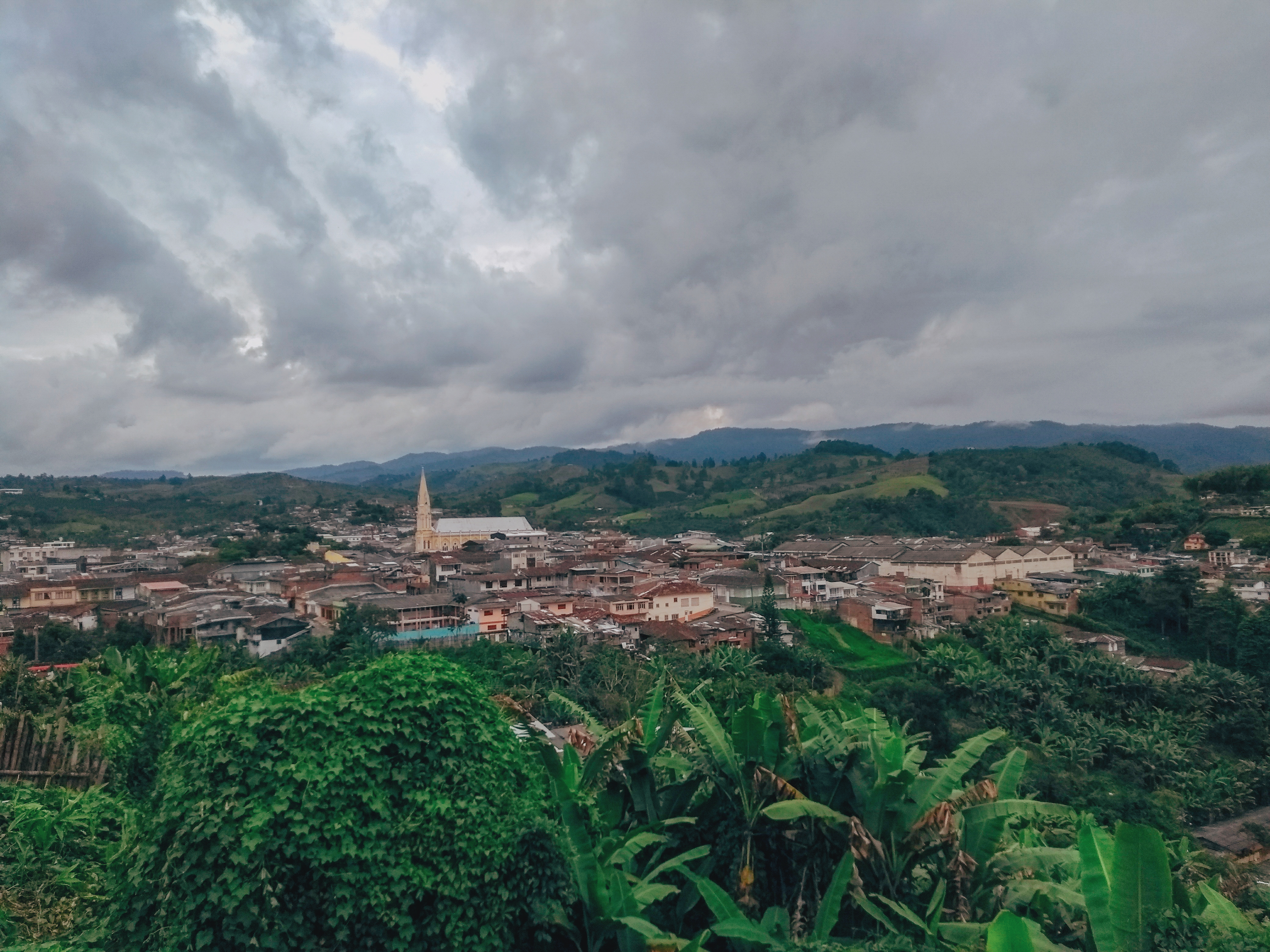
- View of Sevilla

- Flag Coat of arms

- Location of the municipality and town of Sevilla, Valle del Cauca in the Valle del Cauca Department of Colombia.
- Country: Colombia
- Department: Valle del Cauca Department
- Named for: Seville, Spain

Area
  - Municipality and town: 640 km^{2} (250 sq mi)
  - Urban: 4.04 km^{2} (1.56 sq mi)
- Elevation: 1,612 m (5,289 ft)

Population (2020 est.)
  - Municipality and town: 41,153
  - Density: 64/km^{2} (170/sq mi)
  - Urban: 31,331
  - Urban density: 7,760/km^{2} (20,100/sq mi)
- Time zone: UTC-5 (Colombia Standard Time)

Sevilla is a town and municipality in the Valle del Cauca Department, Colombia. Widely recognized and famous as one of the best Colombian coffee producers. It is also known as the "Coffee Capital of Colombia" In 2003, the municipality had a population of approximately 60,000.

== History ==
Founded as San Luis in 1903 by Heraclio Uribe Uribe, it was renamed for the city of Sevilla, Spain, when it became a municipality in 1914.

== Geography ==
Sevilla is located in the northeastern portion of the Valle del Cauca Department, about 90 miles northeast of Cali, the department capital. Sevilla lies on the western slope of the central mountain range, the Cordillera Central, out of the three main ones resting on the beautiful landscape of Colombia. The landscape is also appropriate for long walks and horseback riding. Its climate is widely varied because it is located 1650 metres above sea level.

Climate data for Sevilla (Heraclio Uribe), elevation 1,540 m (5,050 ft), (1971–2000)
Month	Jan	Feb	Mar	Apr	May	Jun	Jul	Aug	Sep	Oct	Nov	Dec	Year
Mean daily maximum °C (°F)	24.2 (75.6)	24.4 (75.9)	24.4 (75.9)	23.9 (75.0)	23.6 (74.5)	23.9 (75.0)	24.5 (76.1)	24.6 (76.3)	24.0 (75.2)	23.1 (73.6)	23.2 (73.8)	23.5 (74.3)	23.9 (75.0)
Daily mean °C (°F)	19.1 (66.4)	19.3 (66.7)	19.5 (67.1)	19.2 (66.6)	19.1 (66.4)	19.3 (66.7)	19.6 (67.3)	19.6 (67.3)	19.1 (66.4)	18.5 (65.3)	18.6 (65.5)	18.7 (65.7)	19.1 (66.4)
Mean daily minimum °C (°F)	15.3 (59.5)	15.4 (59.7)	15.6 (60.1)	15.7 (60.3)	15.6 (60.1)	15.6 (60.1)	15.2 (59.4)	15.2 (59.4)	15.1 (59.2)	15.1 (59.2)	15.2 (59.4)	15.2 (59.4)	15.3 (59.5)
Average precipitation mm (inches)	109.2 (4.30)	137.2 (5.40)	200.8 (7.91)	250.5 (9.86)	234.9 (9.25)	122.8 (4.83)	97.4 (3.83)	115.1 (4.53)	180.1 (7.09)	289.6 (11.40)	243.7 (9.59)	155.0 (6.10)	2,136.3 (84.11)
Average precipitation days	13	14	17	21	21	17	12	14	18	24	20	16	208
Average relative humidity (%)	82	81	82	84	85	83	79	79	82	85	85	84	83
Mean monthly sunshine hours	105.4	96.1	102.3	90.0	93.0	114.0	151.9	139.5	108.0	83.7	81.0	93.0	1,257.9
Mean daily sunshine hours	3.4	3.4	3.3	3.0	3.0	3.8	4.9	4.5	3.6	2.7	2.7	3.0	3.4
Source: Instituto de Hidrologia Meteorologia y Estudios Ambientales

Climate data for Cumbarco, Sevilla, elevation 1,692 m (5,551 ft), (1981–2010)
Month	Jan	Feb	Mar	Apr	May	Jun	Jul	Aug	Sep	Oct	Nov	Dec	Year
Mean daily maximum °C (°F)	23.4 (74.1)	23.5 (74.3)	23.5 (74.3)	23.2 (73.8)	23.2 (73.8)	23.5 (74.3)	23.9 (75.0)	24.2 (75.6)	23.8 (74.8)	22.8 (73.0)	22.5 (72.5)	22.8 (73.0)	23.4 (74.1)
Daily mean °C (°F)	18.9 (66.0)	19.0 (66.2)	18.8 (65.8)	18.8 (65.8)	18.8 (65.8)	19.0 (66.2)	19.2 (66.6)	19.4 (66.9)	19.0 (66.2)	18.5 (65.3)	18.4 (65.1)	18.6 (65.5)	18.9 (66.0)
Mean daily minimum °C (°F)	15.0 (59.0)	15.0 (59.0)	15.1 (59.2)	15.2 (59.4)	15.2 (59.4)	15.1 (59.2)	15.1 (59.2)	15.4 (59.7)	15.1 (59.2)	15.0 (59.0)	15.0 (59.0)	15.1 (59.2)	15.1 (59.2)
Average precipitation mm (inches)	158.2 (6.23)	152.7 (6.01)	228.9 (9.01)	277.5 (10.93)	251.3 (9.89)	143.4 (5.65)	102.6 (4.04)	94.9 (3.74)	190.8 (7.51)	335.5 (13.21)	279.0 (10.98)	208.4 (8.20)	2,423.2 (95.40)
Average precipitation days	15	14	20	23	22	17	13	12	17	24	22	19	217
Average relative humidity (%)	83	84	84	86	86	85	82	81	83	86	86	85	84
Mean monthly sunshine hours	130.2	110.1	102.3	84.0	93.0	111.0	142.6	139.5	105.0	86.8	90.0	102.3	1,296.8
Mean daily sunshine hours	4.2	3.9	3.3	2.8	3.0	3.7	4.6	4.5	3.5	2.8	3.0	3.3	3.5
Source: Instituto de Hidrologia Meteorologia y Estudios Ambientales

== Population ==
According to the National census taken in 1993, Sevilla municipality had a population of 47,283, distributed as follows: men: 26,128; women: 21,155; the municipal seat had a population of 19,311. This amount was considered low as the National Census taken in 1985 gave as a result a similar amount. We mustn't forget that on 1928 the town had a population of 22,000; then, according to National Census taken on 1961 the municipality had a population of 56,793 and was listed as the fourth most populous in the department. The last National Census, taken on 2005 gave a population of 41,632, which represented a diminished rate of growth population. In accordance with the National Administrative Department of Statistics (DANE), on 2010, Sevilla might have a population of 46,507.

== Resources ==
There is a great variety of agricultural products as a result of its diversity on climate floors. Citrus fruits, banana, sugar cane, maize, yucca, and vegetables, among others, are abundantly produced. Cafe cultures surround the town, since the farms outside the population core are coffee producers. There are also gold, silver, and platinum mines nearby.
