= Gaspar de Rodas =

Spanish explorer

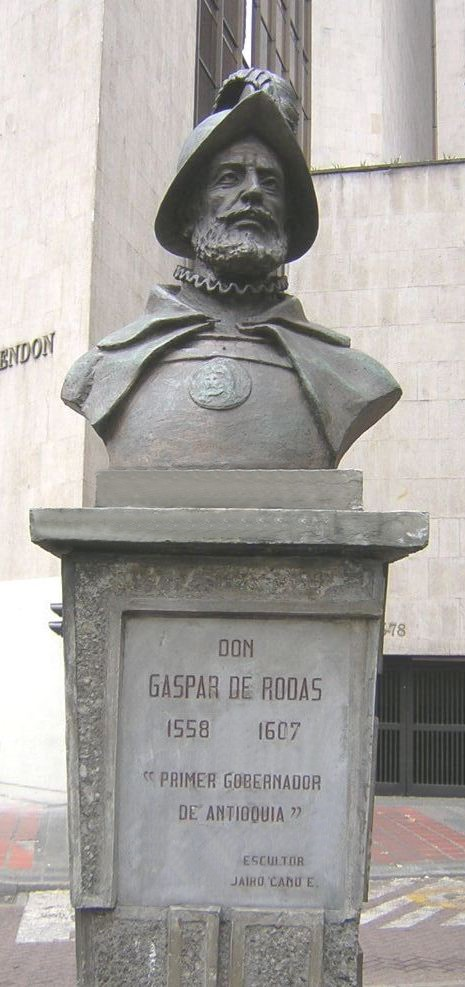
Gaspar de Rodas

Gaspar de Rodas (1518–1607) was a Spanish administrator in the area that now comprises the present-day departments of Antioquia, Caldas, Quindío and Risaralda, in what is now Colombia. He was the first governor of Antioquia, part of the New Kingdom of Granada.

Born in Trujillo, Cáceres, he was the son of Florencio de Rodas and Guiomar Coello. He arrived at Quito in 1540 and in 1541, he traveled to Popayán with Sebastián de Belalcázar, entrusted with the task of relocating the settlement of Santa Fe de Antioquia. He was not successful in this, as he was arrested by the forces of the governor of Cartagena de Indias. However, he was liberated by the marshal Jorge Robledo and Rodas returned to Santa Fe de Antioquia.

After the execution of Robledo in 1546, Rodas was named governor of Antioquia. This was confirmed again in 1576 by the Real Audiencia de Santa Fe de Bogotá upon the death of Andrés de Valdivia.

The first mission entrusted to Rodas was to punish the tribes who had assassinated Valdivia. Having completed this mission, Rodas founded Cáceres in 1576 and returned to Antioquia. He also attempted to pacify the indigenous peoples at Marequita and at the valley of Aburrá . In 1581, he founded Zaragoza de las Palmas.

== Sources ==
- ”La epopeya de la raza extremeña en India”, Vicente Navarro del Castillo, ISBN 84-400-5359-2
