= Magdalena Medio Antioquia =

Location of the Magdalena Medio Antioquia region within the Antioquia Department.

Magdalena Medio is a subregion in Antioquia Department, Colombia. The region comprises six municipalities.

The region is defined by its location within the Middle Magdalena Valley which covers the central area of the Magdalena River basin. It is contiguous to the Magdalena Medio Province of the Bolívar Department.
