= Zarzal =

Zarzal, Valle del Cauca
- Municipality and city
- City of Zarzal, Valle del Cauca
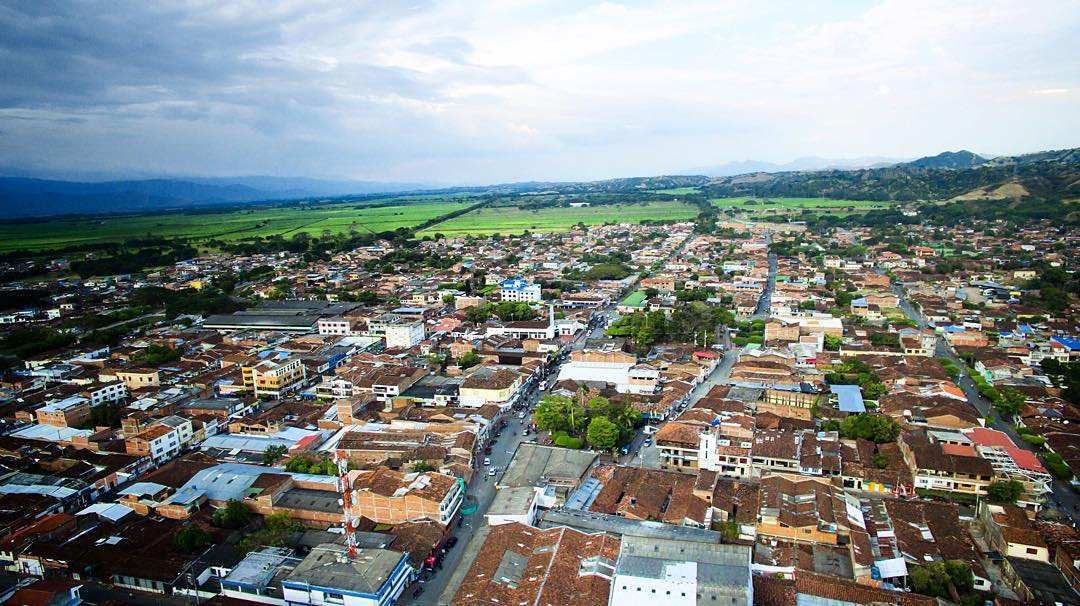

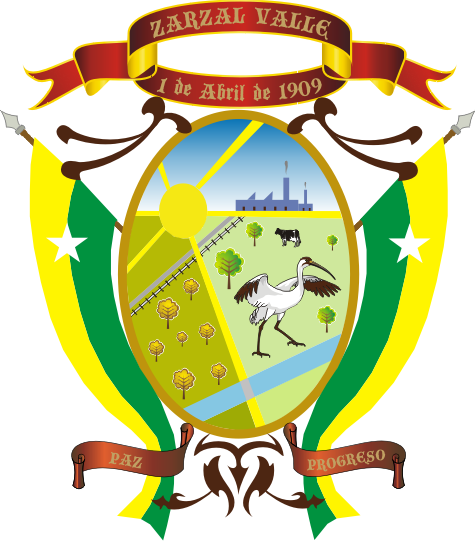
- Flag Coat of arms
- Nicknames: "Sweet Land of Colombia", "The Z"
- Location of the town and municipality of Zarzal in Valle del Cauca Department.

- Location in Colombia
- Coordinates: 4°23′54″N 76°04′38″W
- Country: Colombia
- Department: Valle del Cauca
- Region: Andean
- Demonym: Zarzaleno
- Foundation: April 1, 1909

Government
  - Mayor: María Teresa Giraldo

Area
  - Municipality and city: 367.9 km^{2} (142.0 sq mi)
  - Urban: 4.88 km^{2} (1.88 sq mi)
- Elevation: 916 m (3,005 ft)

Population (2018 census)
  - Municipality and city: 41,925
  - Density: 114.0/km^{2} (295.1/sq mi)
  - Urban: 31,812
  - Urban density: 6,520/km^{2} (16,900/sq mi)
- Time zone: UTC-5
- Website: www.valledelcauca.gov.co/zarzal

Zarzal (Spanish pronunciation: [saɾˈsal]) is a city and municipality in the north of the department of Valle del Cauca in Colombia. Its economy is based primarily on the extensive cultivation of sugar cane, on small and medium enterprises in the metallurgic sector, and on utilities. Commerce is also of great importance, because a great number of warehouses for basic necessity goods exist in the city. A marketplace also exists, which serves as reference for various cities that are close by. Zarzal municipality has a population of about 42,000. New city districts were constructed in the center of the city; it has now become difficult to find bare land inside the city.

== Geography ==
The territory is mostly flat within the valley of the Cauca River, a river that flows into La Paila River. The municipality is also home to the forest of the Caracolíes, Los Chorros, Cumba recreational park, La Paila river, Mount Caré and Mount Pan de Azúcar.

=== Climate ===
Zarzal has a tropical monsoon climate (Köppen Am), bordering on a tropical rainforest climate (Af), although it is relatively dry for those climate types due to the influence of shielding by the Andean cordilleras.

Climate data for Zarzal (Ing Riopaila), elevation 941 m (3,087 ft), (1981–2010)
Month	Jan	Feb	Mar	Apr	May	Jun	Jul	Aug	Sep	Oct	Nov	Dec	Year
Mean daily maximum °C (°F)	31.4 (88.5)	31.9 (89.4)	31.3 (88.3)	30.9 (87.6)	30.6 (87.1)	30.7 (87.3)	31.5 (88.7)	32.0 (89.6)	31.4 (88.5)	30.7 (87.3)	30.3 (86.5)	30.6 (87.1)	31.1 (88.0)
Daily mean °C (°F)	24.5 (76.1)	24.9 (76.8)	24.7 (76.5)	24.2 (75.6)	24.1 (75.4)	24.1 (75.4)	24.3 (75.7)	24.5 (76.1)	24.4 (75.9)	24.1 (75.4)	24.0 (75.2)	24.0 (75.2)	24.3 (75.7)
Mean daily minimum °C (°F)	18.0 (64.4)	18.2 (64.8)	18.4 (65.1)	18.8 (65.8)	18.7 (65.7)	18.3 (64.9)	18.1 (64.6)	18.1 (64.6)	18.1 (64.6)	18.3 (64.9)	18.5 (65.3)	18.3 (64.9)	18.3 (64.9)
Average precipitation mm (inches)	57.1 (2.25)	74.9 (2.95)	142.1 (5.59)	156.6 (6.17)	173.3 (6.82)	107.4 (4.23)	83.8 (3.30)	77.6 (3.06)	98.3 (3.87)	147.9 (5.82)	135.7 (5.34)	102.0 (4.02)	1,346.7 (53.02)
Average precipitation days	9	9	14	17	17	14	11	10	12	16	15	11	153
Average relative humidity (%)	78	76	77	80	81	80	78	77	77	79	80	80	79
Mean monthly sunshine hours	176.7	166.6	161.2	144.0	155.0	159.0	182.9	192.2	171.0	155.0	147.0	151.9	1,962.5
Mean daily sunshine hours	5.7	5.9	5.2	4.8	5.0	5.3	5.9	6.2	5.7	5.0	4.9	4.9	5.4
Source: Instituto de Hidrologia Meteorologia y Estudios Ambientales

== Economy ==
The municipality of Zarzal is one of the region with most production of sugar cane and sugar refineries. The municipality is home to two major companies; the Rio Paila Sugar Company and the Colombina Candy Factory.

Besides the cane and sugar production other agricultural products are produced in the municipality: plantain, yuca, cotton, maize, sorghum, sugar cane, soy, grapes, papaya, passionfruit, pitaya, citrus like oranges and limes, mango, guava, avocado and chontaduro. Some 200 square kilometres (77 sq mi) are used for cattle raising and 0.1 km^{2} (0.039 sq mi) for a small industrial fishing industry that produces tilapia, cachama, peacock bass and bocachico.

== Higher education ==
The Zarzal satellite of the Universidad del Valle (University of Valle) has a population of 1200 students in all of its academic programs, as well as its own Universidad del Valle site. It was founded in 1986 and operates in an area known for its heavy agricultural activity. The Zarzal satellite offers academic programs that strengthen the development of the region. It serves people in the areas of Andalucía, Bolívar, Bugalagrande, El Dovio, La Unión, Obando, Roldanillo, Versalles, Toro, and Zarzal. Different social organizations that exist in many of these municipalities have participated, or at least were evaluated, in local development projects.

On April 1, 2011 the city's mayoral office has donated a lot in the city's south zone that lies near the small town of La Paila. This lot extends to a length of four to five Hectares and will house the University Campus of the Zarzal Regional Seat. This decision occurred during the Zarzal Satellite Hearing, which was presided over by the only notary of the city of Zarzal, dean Iván Enrique Ramos Calderón, Zarzal satellite director Cecilian Madriñan Polo, the mayor, the city council, and the university community.

The new campus will have classrooms, auditoriums, laboratories (for investigation, languages, foods, electronics, mathematics, and systems) and areas for sport and cultural activities (theatres, sport fields/courts, a gymnasium, and a pool) that will cater to the needs of the students in the municipality of Zarzal and its surrounding area of influence.
