= Flag of Valle del Cauca Department =

Flag of Valle del Cauca

The Flag of the Department of Valle del Cauca is the representative flag of the Colombian Department of Valle del Cauca.

== History ==
The origin of the flag is attributed to General José María Cabal who was in charge of the independentist forces in Valle del Cauca and who in a dream saw virgin Mary wearing a celestial blue and white mantle. The flag was used on June 6, 1811 by the confederate cities of Anserma, Buga, Cali, Caloto, Cartago, Iscuandé, Popayán and Toro when these declared independence from the rest of the country.

It was officially adopted on December 31, 1960 by the Department Assembly of Valle del Cauca.

=== Criticism ===
The flag and its significance has generated controversy in Valle del Cauca for its pallid colors and for its religious connotation (Colombia self-proclaimed secularity in the Colombian Constitution of 1991). The flag was adopted by ordinance and not by popular plebiscite, as some argue the colors also misrepresented the people and things of Valle del Cauca. Painter Omar Rayo proposed the use of the colors of the Colombian flag adding the green color, which would represent the greenery of the department.

== Description ==
The flag is composed by two parallel horizontal stripes of the same size one white and the other of a celestial blue and with a silver border.

Interpretation

- celestial blue: honesty, sincerity and loyalty.
- white: peace, beauty and innocence.
- silver: integrity, fortitude and wisdom.

== Usage ==
The flag is flown in every official building of Valle del Cauca and the official events the governor or any of the municipal mayor are present. The flag is flown also by the flag of Colombia.
