= Almacenes La 14 =

- Company type: Sociedad Anónima
- Industry: Retail
- Founded: 1964; 62 years ago in Cali
- Founder: Abel Cardona Franco
- Headquarters: Cali, Colombia
- Number of locations: 25
- Products: Hypermarket, supermarket
- Website: www.la14.com

Almacenes La 14 was a Colombian company dedicated to the retail trade of consumer products. It had 14 points of sale in the city of Cali, 6 more distributed in the department of Valle del Cauca and at the national level it extended its operation to the cities of Girardot, Popayán, Pereira, Manizales, Armenia and Neiva with a total of 26 stores throughout the country.

Almacenes La 14 had its main headquarters in Calima Centro Comercial Cali or better known as Centro Comercial La 14 de Calima in the city of Cali, which organized all its headquarters in Colombia, where the administrative and accounting parts and all the areas were located.

The company closed its doors in early 2021.

== History ==
The company was founded in Cali in 1964 by Abel Cardona Franco on 14th Street in the city centre (hence the origin of its name) and was originally a hardware store. Its commercial offer was developed through large surface formats and local stores. The company was considered one of the most important in southwestern Colombia.

The company's logo was: three red squares arranged vertically, the first two of medium size with the letters L and A, and the last one of large size where the number 14 was and its motto was "¡Siempre te da más!" highlighting its wide range of products in its headquarters.

In 1981, its first branch was opened in the Cosmocentro Shopping Center, thus venturing into an anchor position in a shopping center. In 1987, its store was opened in the Calima Shopping Center, where its largest and main headquarters would be located. In 1992 the company arrived in Manizales, thus beginning its expansion throughout Colombia. In 1993 the company arrived in Buenaventura where they were pioneers in the retail sector. In 1997, the Alfaguara Shopping Center was opened, with La 14 reaching Jamundí.

In 2011 the company arrived in the capital Bogotá, having its maximum expansion throughout the country, being present in 6 municipalities of Valle del Cauca, in Armenia, Pereira, Manizales, in Neiva and in the capital.

La 14 did very well, however everything would change in 2015 when the then owner of the company Jaime Cardona died. His death marked the beginning of the end for the company.
