= Julián Millán =

Colombian footballer (born 1998)

Personal information
- Full name: Julián Camilo Millán Díaz
- Date of birth: 27 March 1998 (age 28)
- Place of birth: Bugalagrande, Colombia
- Height: 1.87 m (6 ft 2 in)
- Position: Centre-back

Team information
- Current team: Fluminense
- Number: 29

Youth career
- Cortuluá

Senior career*
Years	Team	Apps	(Gls)
2016–2023	Cortuluá	103	(9)
2018	→ Llaneros (loan)	30	(4)
2019	→ Patriotas (loan)	14	(0)
2023	→ Santa Fe (loan)	23	(1)
2024	Inter Palmira	0	(0)
2024	→ Santa Fe (loan)	45	(5)
2025–2026	Nacional	43	(3)
2026–	Fluminense	0	(0)
- * Club domestic league appearances and goals as of 20:19, 16 March 2026 (UTC)

Julián Camilo Millán Díaz (born 27 March 1998) is a Colombian footballer who plays as a centre-back for Campeonato Brasileiro Série A club Fluminense.

== Club career ==
=== Early career ===
Born in Bugalagrande, Valle del Cauca, Millán was a youth product of Cortuluá, and made his first team debut with the club on 16 March 2016, starting in a 1–0 away loss to América de Cali in the 2016 Copa Colombia. He made his Categoría Primera A debut on 29 October, in a 3–1 loss to Atlético Bucaramanga, and featured in a further six league matches in the following year before moving out on loan to Categoría Primera B side Llaneros for the 2018 season.

A regular starter at Llaneros, Millán played the 2019 season on loan at first division side Patriotas Boyacá, before returning to Cortuluá in 2020, with the club now in second division. He helped in their promotion in the following year, scoring twice in 29 matches.

=== Santa Fe ===
On 23 December 2022, Independiente Santa Fe announced the signing of Millán, on loan. He quickly established himself as a starter, and scored five goals during the 2024 season.

=== Nacional ===
In January 2025, Millán moved abroad and joined Uruguayan side Nacional on a three-year deal. In December of that year, after helping the club to win the league, Nacional bought the remaining 50% of his economic rights, and he renewed his link until 2028.

=== Fluminense ===
On 3 March 2026, Campeonato Brasileiro Série A side Fluminense announced the signing of Millán on a four-year contract, for a rumoured fee of US$ 5 million.

== Career statistics ==
As of 16 March 2026

Club	Season	League			National cup (Note: Includes Copa Colombia, Copa Uruguay, Copa do Brasil)		Continental		Other		Total	
Club	Season	Division	Apps	Goals	Apps	Goals	Apps	Goals	Apps	Goals	Apps	Goals
Cortuluá	2016	Categoría Primera A	1	0	4	0	—		—		5	0
Cortuluá	2017	Categoría Primera A	6	0	2	0	—		—		8	0
Cortuluá	2020	Categoría Primera B	20	4	—		—		—		20	4
Cortuluá	2021	Categoría Primera B	38	3	—		—		—		38	3
Cortuluá	2022	Categoría Primera A	38	2	—		—		—		38	2
Cortuluá	Total		103	9	6	0	—		—		109	9
Llaneros (loan)	2018	Categoría Primera B	30	4	4	0	—		—		34	4
Patriotas (loan)	2019	Categoría Primera A	14	0	6	0	—		—		20	0
Santa Fe (loan)	2023	Categoría Primera A	23	1	2	0	2 (Note: Appearance(s) in Copa Sudamericana)	0	—		27	1
Santa Fe (loan)	2024	Categoría Primera A	45	5	4	0	—		—		49	5
Santa Fe (loan)	Total		68	6	6	0	2	0	—		76	6
Nacional	2025	Liga AUF Uruguaya	39	2	0	0	6 (Note: Appearances in Copa Libertadores)	2	1 (Note: Appearance(s) in Supercopa Uruguaya)	0	46	4
Nacional	2026	Liga AUF Uruguaya	4	1	0	0	0	0	1	0	5	1
Nacional	Total		43	3	0	0	6	2	2	0	51	5
Fluminense	2026	Série A	0	0	0	0	0	0	—		0	0
Career total			258	22	22	0	8	2	2	0	290	24
