= El Dovio =

- Municipality and town
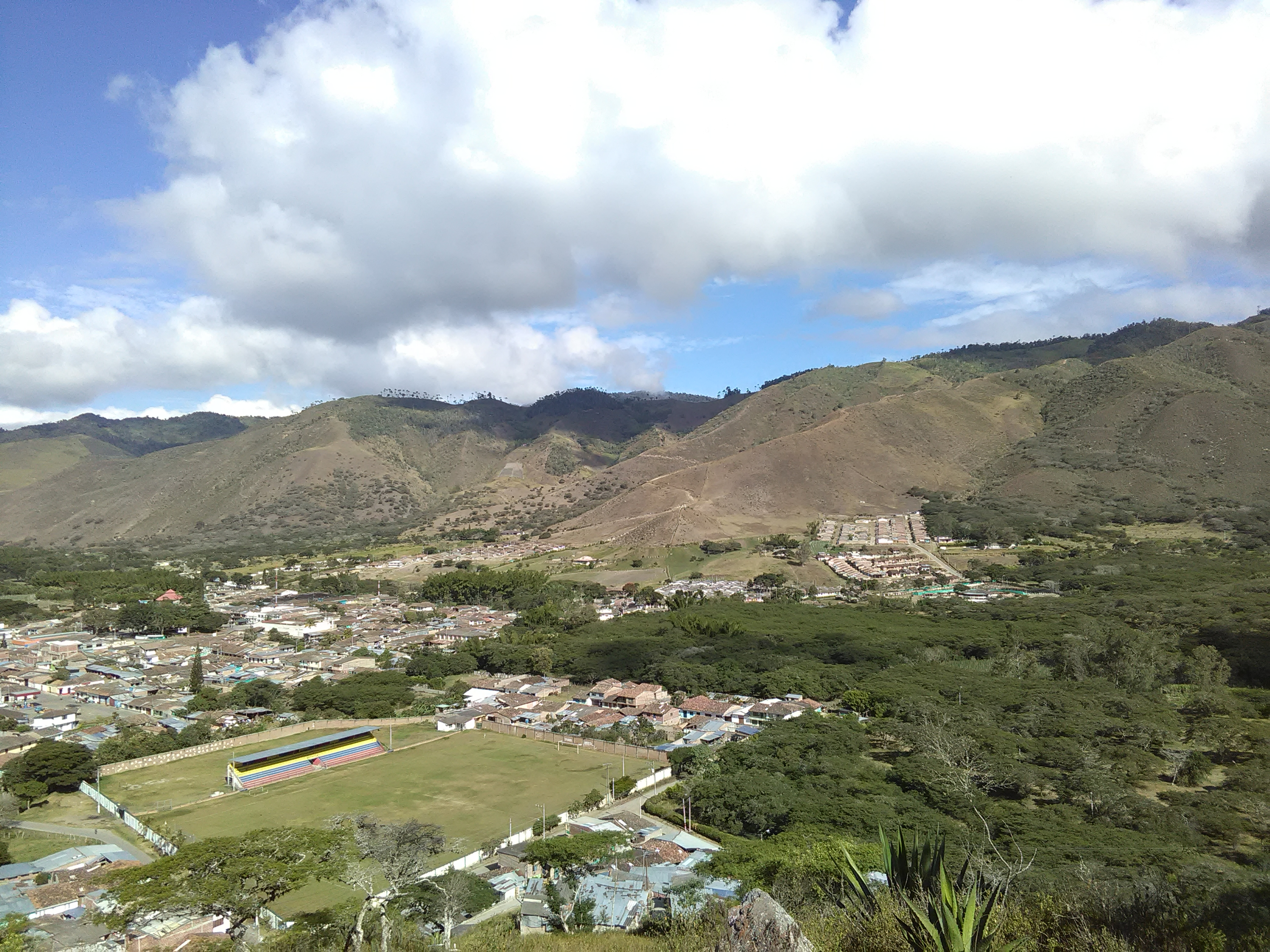
- View of El Dovio

- Flag Coat of arms

- Location of the municipality and town of El Dovio in the Valle del Cauca Department of Colombia.

- Location in Colombia
- Coordinates: 4°31′N 76°14′W
- Country: Colombia
- Department: Valle del Cauca Department

Population (2015)
  - Total: 8,508
- Time zone: UTC-5 (Colombia Standard Time)

El Dovio is a town and municipality located in the Department of Valle del Cauca, Colombia.

El Dovio is roughly forty minutes' drive from Roldanillo, a larger town famed internationally for its suitability as a destination for paragliding, and for its museum dedicated to modern art and named for a renowned Colombian modern artist, Omar Rayo. Vans and buses travel approximately hourly on the hour most days between the Occidente bus terminal near Roldanillo's main square and the public transit terminal in El Dovio adjacent El Dovio's town hall.

Waterfalls named La Alejandria and El Salto can be reached via short journeys from El Dovio. La Alejandria can be accessed by taking a Jeep bound for La Pradera or for El Dumar from the main public transit terminal in El Dovio. The public transport terminal also offers transport to small settlements and villages deep inside the Rio Garrapatas river canyon, as well as to the towns of Versalles and Roldanillo.
