= Fanor Mondragón =

Colombian energy chemist and professor

Fanor Mondragón Pérez
- Born: Colombia
- Education: Universidad de Antioquia; Hokkaidō University
- Occupations: Researcher; Chemist
- Employer: University of Antioquia

Fanor Mondragón Pérez is a Colombian chemist, professor and researcher, recognized for his research on the impact of fossil fuels on the environment. Member of the Colombian Academy of Exact, Physical and Natural Sciences, during his career he has won various awards, such as the Francisco Antonio Zea University Merit Medal and the Fulbright Research Grant, among others. He is a professor emeritus of the University of Antioquia and an ambassador for Hokkaidō University in Colombia.

== Education and career ==
Mondragón was born in Bolívar, Valle del Cauca. He studied in Medellín and graduated as a chemical engineer from the University of Antioquia in 1974. Later, he joined the Department of Chemistry at the University of Antioquia as a teacher and researcher. He obtained a scholarship from Japan's Ministry of Education, through the Japanese embassy in Colombia, to do his postgraduate studies at Hokkaidō University in Sapporo. In Hokkaido he completed his master's (1980–1981) and doctorate (1981–1984) degrees with professor Koji Ouchi, working on the structure and chemical reactions of coal. Its doctoral committee included Akira Suzuki, winner of the Nobel Prize in Chemistry.

Upon finishing his studies, Mondragón returned to the University of Antioquia and in 1984 took over the leadership of the Chemical Group for Energy Resources and the Environment (QUIREMA), founded by professor Gustavo Quintero in 1982. He has held various positions at his alma mater, such as teacher, coordinator of the doctorate in chemical sciences and vice-chancellor for research. During his time as vice-chancellor, he visited the Colombian embassy in Korea to promote relations between the universities of both countries. He was appointed professor emeritus of the University of Antioquia in September 2019.

Since 2021 Mondragón has been a full member of the Colombian Academy of Exact, Physical and Natural Sciences, where he coordinates the permanent commission on science, technology and innovative society. He served as president of the Ibero-American Federation of Catalysis Societies (FISOCAT) between 2016 and 2020. In November 2018, professor Kiyoharu Tadanaga visited the University of Antioquia to present Mondragón with the certificate of his appointment as ambassador of Hokkaidō University in Colombia. In 2020, he was elected to the board of directors of the non-profit association Ruta N.

His work has focused on hydrocarbons, their effect on the environment, and on sustainable alternatives to fossil fuels. Mondragón has received various recognitions during his academic career. Mondragón collaborated with Colombian senator Iván Darío Agudelo in the creation and preparation of a bill for the creation of the Ministry of Science and Technology in Colombia.

== Selected publications ==
- Alejandro Molina, Fanor Mondragon. 1998. Reactivity of coal gasification with steam and CO_{2}. Fuel; 77(15): 1831–1839. doi:10.1016/S0016-2361(98)00123-9
- Germán Sierra Gallego, Fanor Mondragón, Joel Barrault, Jean-Michel Tatibouët, Catherine Batiot-Dupeyrat. 2006. CO_{2} reforming of CH4 over La–Ni based perovskite precursors. Applied Catalysis A: General; 311:164-171. doi:10.1016/j.apcata.2006.06.024
- Carlos Enrique Daza, Jaime Gallego, Fanor Mondragón, Sonia Moreno, Rafael Molina. 2010. High stability of Ce-promoted Ni/Mg–Al catalysts derived from hydrotalcites in dry reforming of methane. Fuel; 89(3): 592–603. doi:10.1016/j.fuel.2009.10.010
- German Sierra Gallego, Catherine Batiot-Dupeyrat, Joel Barrault, Elizabeth Florez, Fanor Mondragon. 2008. Applied Catalysis A: General; 334(1–2): 251–258. doi: 10.1016/j.apcata.2007.10.010
- Fanor Mondragon, Fabio Rincon, Ligia Sierra, Jaime Escobar, Jose Ramirez, John Fernandez. 1990. New perspectives for coal ash utilization: synthesis of zeolitic materials. Fuel; 69(2): 263–266. doi:10.1016/0016-2361(90)90187-U.

== Awards and recognitions ==
- Research Award of the University of Antioquia (1999)
- Beca de Investigación de la Comisión Fulbright de Estados Unidos
- Merit Medal Francisco Antonio Zea
- Scholarship from the Education Ministry of Japan for postgraduate studies
- Scopus Award 2013
- Emeritus Researcher of the Colombian Ministry of Science, Technology and Innovation
