= Bugalagrande =

- Municipality and town
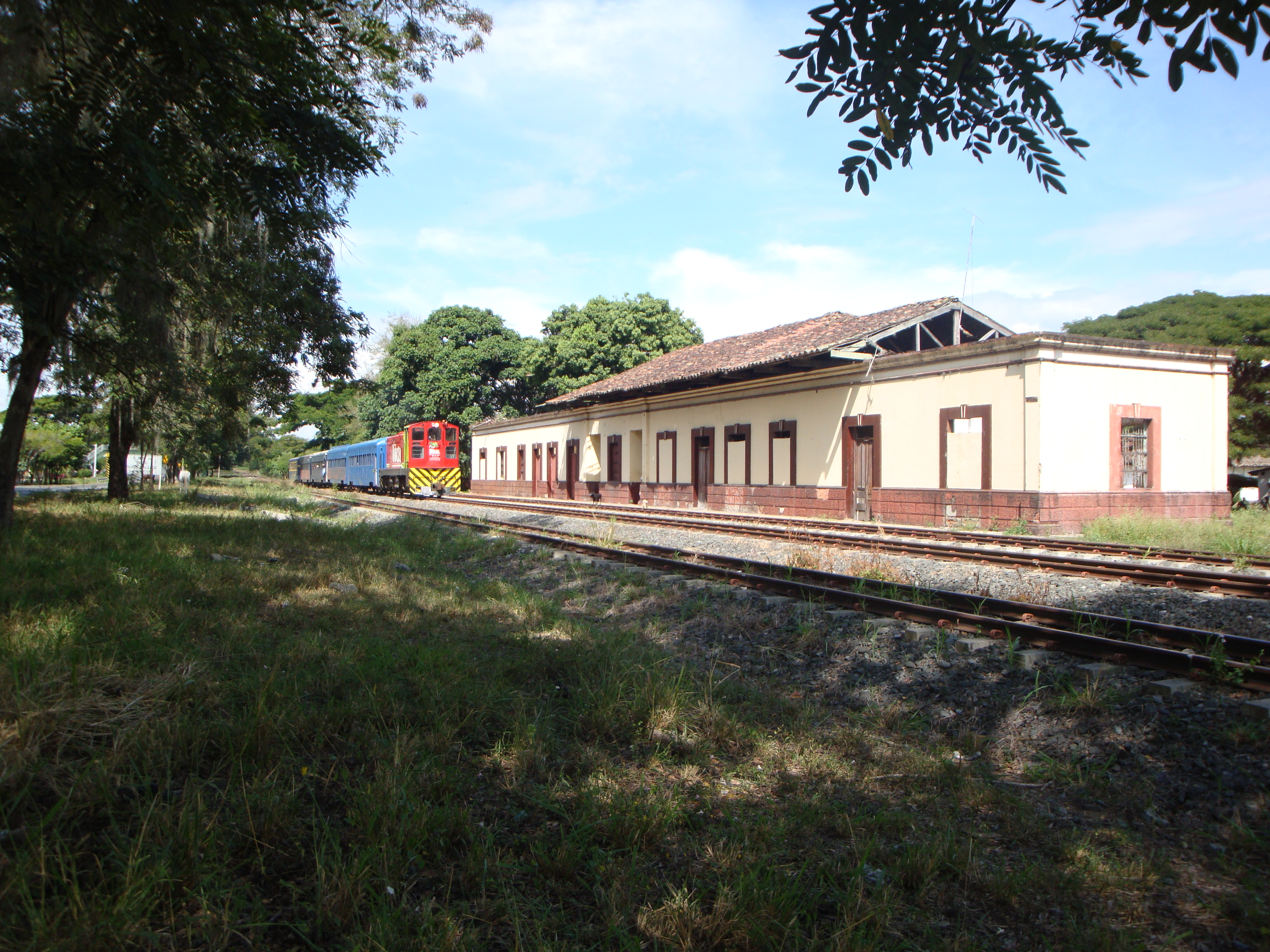
- The historic train station in 2014, prior to renovations

- Flag

- Location of the municipality and town of Bugalagrande in the Valle del Cauca Department of Colombia.

- Location in Colombia
- Coordinates: 4°13′N 76°10′W
- Country: Colombia
- Department: Valle del Cauca Department

Area
  - Municipality and town: 374 km^{2} (144 sq mi)
  - Urban: 2 km^{2} (0.77 sq mi)
- Elevation: 950 m (3,120 ft)

Population (2025)
  - Municipality and town: 25,476
  - Density: 68/km^{2} (180/sq mi)
  - Urban: 11,902
- Time zone: UTC-5 (Colombia Standard Time)
- Climate: Af
- Website: https://www.bugalagrande-valle.gov.co/

Bugalagrande is a municipality located in the Valle del Cauca department of Colombia. It is situated in the Cauca River Valley, a fertile region known for its agricultural production, particularly sugarcane. The town has a history tied to the economic development of the Valle del Cauca, benefiting from its strategic location for agriculture and transportation. Bugalagrande is noted as a very hospitable town with very friendly locals.

== History ==
It was founded in 1662 by Diego Rengifo Salazar, who brought numerous indigenous people to his encomienda. It is said to have been named Bugalagrande because the river running through the town is significantly bigger than the river that runs through the nearby town of Buga. In 1854 its name was changed to Nariño, in honor of Antonio Nariño, a precursor of Colombian independence, a name it retained until 1875, when it was changed back.

== Economy ==
The economy of the town is based on agriculture, livestock, and industrial businesses, notably a Nestle factory, one of the largest in the country. The most commonly grown crop is sugarcane, but other crops grown in Bugalagrande and its subsequent municipalities include coffee, banana, sorghum, corn, pineapple, soy, and to a lesser extent cotton, avocados, yucca, and a great variety of tropical fruits including but not limited to passion fruit and, a regional staple, chontaduro. The municipality greatly benefits from the nearby convergence of the Bugalagrande River and the Cauca River, which allows the area to be even more fertile than the already fertile Cauca River Valley. In recent years, tensions have risen between the Nestle factory and locals, including the labor syndicate SINALTRAINAL, who allege that the factory and subsequently the company mistreat workers and damage the environment. The company has brought tanks, special forces units, and overall increased military presence in the town upon request, most notably in 1988. Allegations have also been made against Nestle that they have killed, disappeared, or intimidated union workers and leaders. At least two deaths are directly connected to these allegations, Hector Daniel Useche Beron in 1986, and Omar Dario Rodriguez Salazar in 2000. Union and syndicate leaders have also raised allegations of intimidation and forced displacement. This conflict in recent years has been characterized by vandalism of the factory and nearby areas, boycotts of Nestle products, and occasional protests.

== Places of Interest ==
=== Historic Train Station ===
Built in 1872 as part of the Ferrocarril del Pacifico (Pacific Railway), Bugalagrande's historic train station is listed on Colombia's Sites of National Heritage. It underwent extensive renovations in 2019, as it had decayed after a few decades of being vacant. In the modern day it is host to community events and gatherings, as well as "brujitas", makeshift motorcycles adapted to train tracks that offer sightseeing rides down the railway. Adjacent to the train station is a futsal field, which is popular among locals.

=== Capilla Nuestra Senora de la Concepcion ===
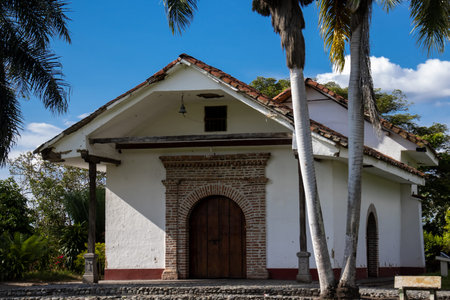
Capilla Nuestra Senora de la Concepcion

Located in El Overo, a division of the municipality, the Capilla Nuestra Senora de la Concepcion was built sometime between the 17th and 19th centuries during Spanish colonial rule. It is one of the most ancient structures in the north of the Cauca River Valley, and is important in the evangelization of the rural area. It has classic colonial architecture and significant cultural value.

=== Parque Simon Bolivar ===
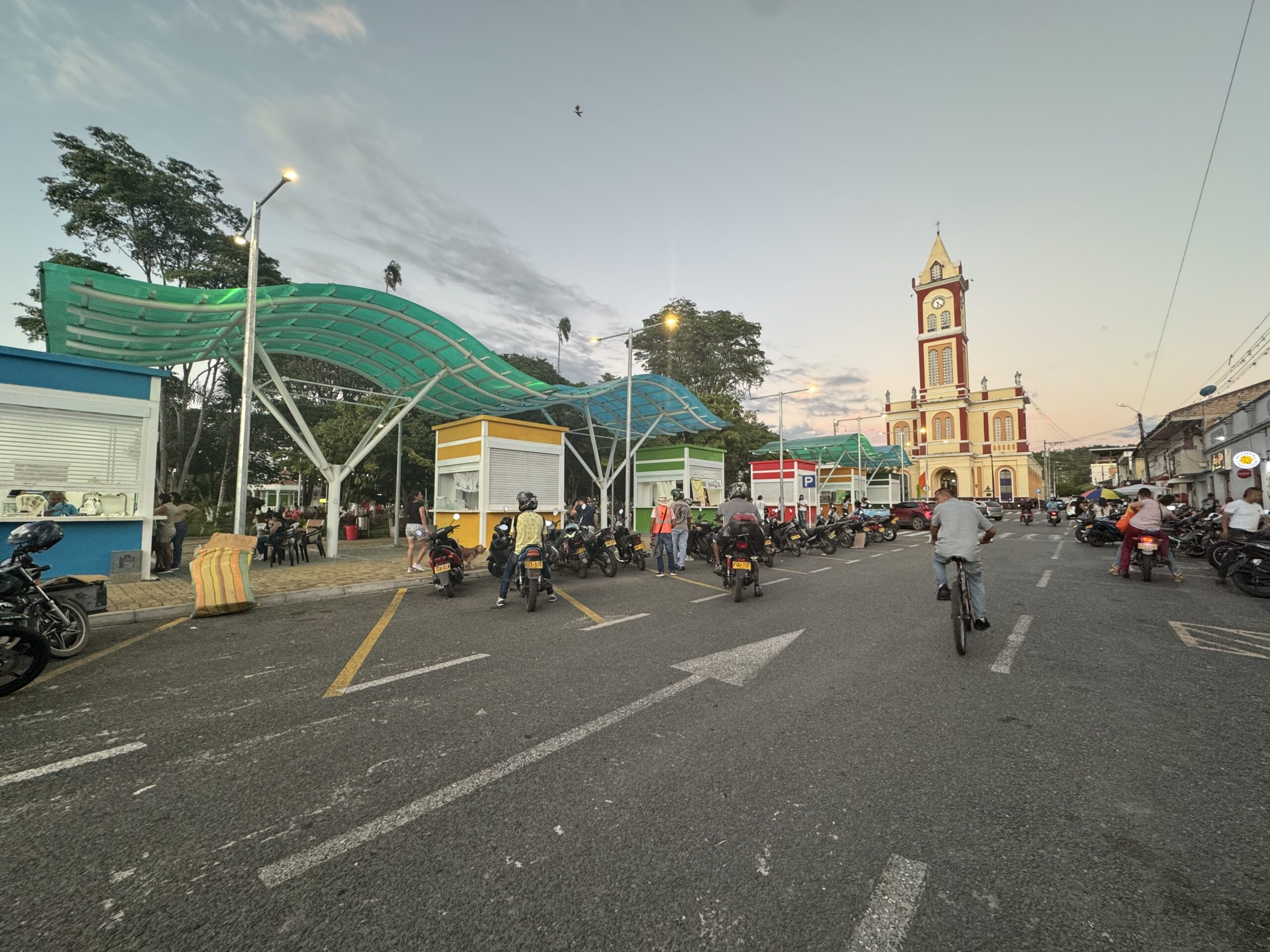
The Simon Bolivar Park and the Church of San Bernabe

The main and central park of Bugalagrande, this park is a very popular spot among locals. Adjacent to the park is the picturesque Iglesia de San Bernabe, the main church of the town. The park, formerly a historic plaza, underwent a revitalization project from 2022-2025 which saw the introduction of new kiosks for businesses. Surrounding the park is the core of Bugalagrande's nightlife and gastronomy, including multiple nightclubs and many restaurants.

== Neighborhoods ==
The town is composed of the following neighborhoods: Brisas del Rio, Canaveral, Centro, Cocicoinpa, El Eden, El Jardin, Gualcoche, Jose Antonio Galan, La Esperanza, La Maria, La Maria II, La Planta, Los Marmoles, Municipal, Minobras, Monaco, Narino, Obrero, Orisol, Paulus VI, Portales, Primero de Mayo, Ricaurte, and Urbanizacion El Jar.

== Subdivisions ==
=== Villages ===
The following villages are located in the municipality and subsequently under the same jurisdiction: Ceilan, El Overo, Galicia, Mestizal, Paila Arriba, and Uribe Uribe.

=== Hamlets ===
The following hamlets are located in the municipality and subsequently under the same jurisdiction: La Colonia, Chorreras, Guayabo, Chicoral, San Antonio, Jiguales, Lagunilla, La Morena, La Esmeralda, San Antonio, Raiceros, La Cristalina, Alto Bonito, El Placer, El Rocío, Raiceros, and San Isidro.

== Climate ==
Climate data for Bugalagrande (SanMarcos), elevation 1,002 m (3,287 ft), (1981–2010)
Month	Jan	Feb	Mar	Apr	May	Jun	Jul	Aug	Sep	Oct	Nov	Dec	Year
Mean daily maximum °C (°F)	29.4 (84.9)	29.7 (85.5)	29.7 (85.5)	29.1 (84.4)	29.0 (84.2)	29.1 (84.4)	29.8 (85.6)	30.4 (86.7)	30.0 (86.0)	29.0 (84.2)	28.4 (83.1)	28.8 (83.8)	29.4 (84.9)
Daily mean °C (°F)	23.3 (73.9)	23.4 (74.1)	23.4 (74.1)	23.3 (73.9)	23.2 (73.8)	23.3 (73.9)	23.3 (73.9)	23.6 (74.5)	23.5 (74.3)	23.0 (73.4)	22.9 (73.2)	23.1 (73.6)	23.3 (73.9)
Mean daily minimum °C (°F)	17.2 (63.0)	17.4 (63.3)	17.8 (64.0)	18.1 (64.6)	18.1 (64.6)	17.6 (63.7)	17.0 (62.6)	16.7 (62.1)	17.2 (63.0)	17.5 (63.5)	17.8 (64.0)	17.6 (63.7)	17.5 (63.5)
Average precipitation mm (inches)	78.1 (3.07)	82.4 (3.24)	145.1 (5.71)	189.4 (7.46)	160.1 (6.30)	91.9 (3.62)	80.8 (3.18)	71.4 (2.81)	121.8 (4.80)	187.1 (7.37)	169.7 (6.68)	112.9 (4.44)	1,490.8 (58.69)
Average precipitation days	9	9	14	15	15	12	9	8	12	17	15	11	143
Average relative humidity (%)	78	77	79	81	82	81	79	76	77	80	81	81	79
Source: Instituto de Hidrologia Meteorologia y Estudios Ambientales

== Notable People ==
- Julián Millán (born 1998), footballer
- Johan Wallens (born 1992), footballer
- Carlos Barahona (born 1980), footballer
- Humberto Gonzalez Narvaez (1929-2016), politician and diplomat
- Hector Fabio Useche (born 1974), politician and acclaimed odontologist
