= Jamundí =

- Municipality and city
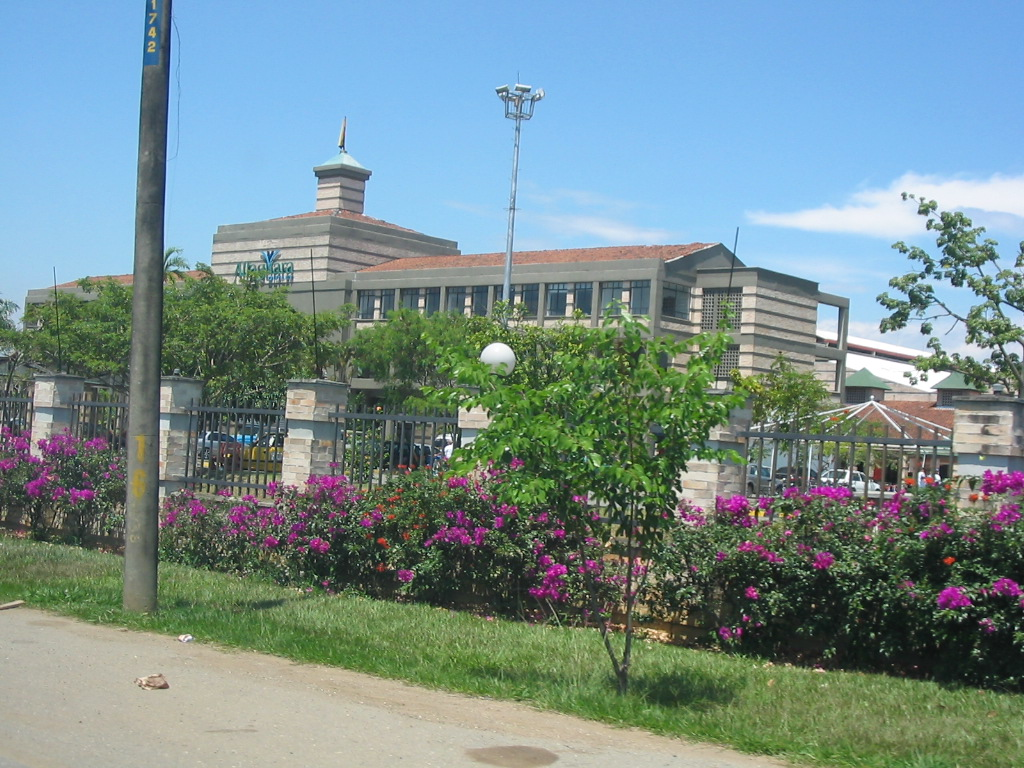
- Alfaguara shopping mall in Jamundí

- Flag Coat of arms

- Location of the municipality and town of Jamundí in the Valle del Cauca Department of Colombia

- Location in Colombia
- Coordinates: 3°16′N 76°33′W
- Country: Colombia
- Department: Valle del Cauca Department
- Founded: 23 March 1536
- Founder: Juan de Ampudia and Pedro de Añasco

Government
  - Mayor: Andrés Felipe Ramírez (2020–2023)

Area
  - Municipality and city: 629 km^{2} (243 sq mi)
  - Urban: 24.84 km^{2} (9.59 sq mi)
- Elevation: 975 m (3,199 ft)

Population (2020 est.)
  - Municipality and city: 167,147
  - Density: 266/km^{2} (688/sq mi)
  - Urban: 130,114
  - Urban density: 5,238/km^{2} (13,570/sq mi)
- Demonym: Jamundeña
- Time zone: UTC-5 (Colombia Standard Time)
- Area code: 57 + 2
- Website: www.jamundi.gov.co

Jamundí is a town and municipality in the Department of Valle del Cauca, Colombia.

Jamundí is located 17 kilometres (11 mi) south of Cali (the capital of the department) in the west riverside of the Cauca River The average temperature is 23 °C.

== History ==
Jamundi was founded on March 23, 1536; four months before Cali, by the Spanish conquistadors Pedro de Añasco and Juan de Ampudia. The name comes from the cacique Jamundí, chief of the tribe that lived in the territory before the arrival of the Spanish.

== Geography ==
The municipality is characterized by a flat surface, although some mountainous terrain at the west, the "Farallones de Cali", that presents heights of 4200 meters. It's located in between the Cauca River and the "Western Ranges of Colombia", also it has seven rivers: "Claro River", "Cauca", "Guachinte", "Jamundí", "Jordán", "Pital" and "Timba" and a lot of streams that flow in the town and the rural area.

== Armed conflict and crime ==
Jamundí is highly affected by the Colombian armed conflict as of 2011. FARC rebels have a significant presence in the municipality and have, as of 2013, frequently attacked the police and army there. In August 2011 a large group of FARC guerrillas attacked the military, killing two soldiers from the Colombian army and wounding four more.

Jamundí is also the locality where serial killer Luis Alfredo Garavito, one of the most prolific serial killers of all time, committed his first murder. In 1992, while drinking heavily at a local bar, Garavito lured a young boy to an isolated area, where he raped and murdered him. He confessed to this and the other murders after his arrest in April 1999.

== Tourism ==
Parque De Los Cholados: Jamundi's Cholado Park is located in a plaza close to Downtown Jamundi. This park is dedicated solely to selling a popular Colombian dessert called Cholado. Numerous vendors come here and set up shop to sell this dessert. It is said that the Cholado was originally made in Jamundi and that the Cholados made here are made using the authentic, original recipe. Many from neighboring Cali visit Jamundi just so they can come to Cholado Park and eat authentic Cholados. The vendors in Cholado Park also frequently sell other desserts, such as Luladas, Snow Cones, and Fruit Salads.

Centro Comercial Alfaguara: Alfaguara Shopping Mall is located in the south of the town, was opened in 1996, have 89 shops, two man-made lakes, and a hypermarket: Éxito.

== Sports ==
Had a football (soccer) team called Depor F.C. which plays in the Colombian second division. It is now based in the city of Cali, changing its name to Depor Aguablanca.

== Climate ==
Climate data for Jamundí (Potrerito), elevation 1,010 m (3,310 ft), (1971–2000)
Month	Jan	Feb	Mar	Apr	May	Jun	Jul	Aug	Sep	Oct	Nov	Dec	Year
Mean daily maximum °C (°F)	29.0 (84.2)	29.2 (84.6)	29.5 (85.1)	28.9 (84.0)	28.3 (82.9)	28.4 (83.1)	29.1 (84.4)	29.7 (85.5)	29.4 (84.9)	28.4 (83.1)	28.3 (82.9)	28.0 (82.4)	28.8 (83.8)
Daily mean °C (°F)	23.9 (75.0)	23.9 (75.0)	23.9 (75.0)	23.6 (74.5)	23.5 (74.3)	23.6 (74.5)	23.9 (75.0)	24.0 (75.2)	23.7 (74.7)	23.0 (73.4)	23.0 (73.4)	23.3 (73.9)	23.6 (74.5)
Mean daily minimum °C (°F)	18.6 (65.5)	18.8 (65.8)	18.9 (66.0)	18.8 (65.8)	18.7 (65.7)	18.3 (64.9)	17.6 (63.7)	17.7 (63.9)	18.1 (64.6)	18.2 (64.8)	18.5 (65.3)	18.5 (65.3)	18.4 (65.1)
Average precipitation mm (inches)	123.5 (4.86)	150.7 (5.93)	181.9 (7.16)	255.3 (10.05)	236.2 (9.30)	133.3 (5.25)	71.6 (2.82)	89.0 (3.50)	139.7 (5.50)	245.7 (9.67)	213.6 (8.41)	155.1 (6.11)	1,995.6 (78.57)
Average precipitation days	12	13	15	19	19	14	10	11	14	21	18	16	180
Average relative humidity (%)	77	76	78	79	80	79	74	73	75	79	80	80	78
Mean monthly sunshine hours	189.1	155.5	179.8	150.0	161.2	174.0	204.6	198.4	177.0	158.1	159.0	155.0	2,061.7
Mean daily sunshine hours	6.1	5.5	5.8	5.0	5.2	5.8	6.6	6.4	5.9	5.1	5.3	5.0	5.6
Source: Instituto de Hidrologia Meteorologia y Estudios Ambientales

== Gallery ==
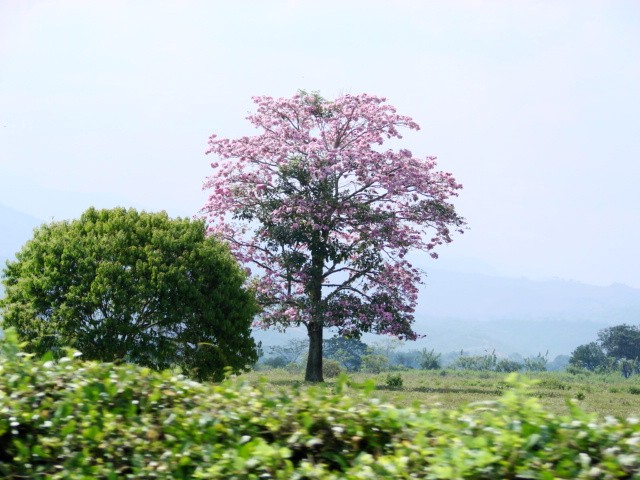
Rural area of Jamundí

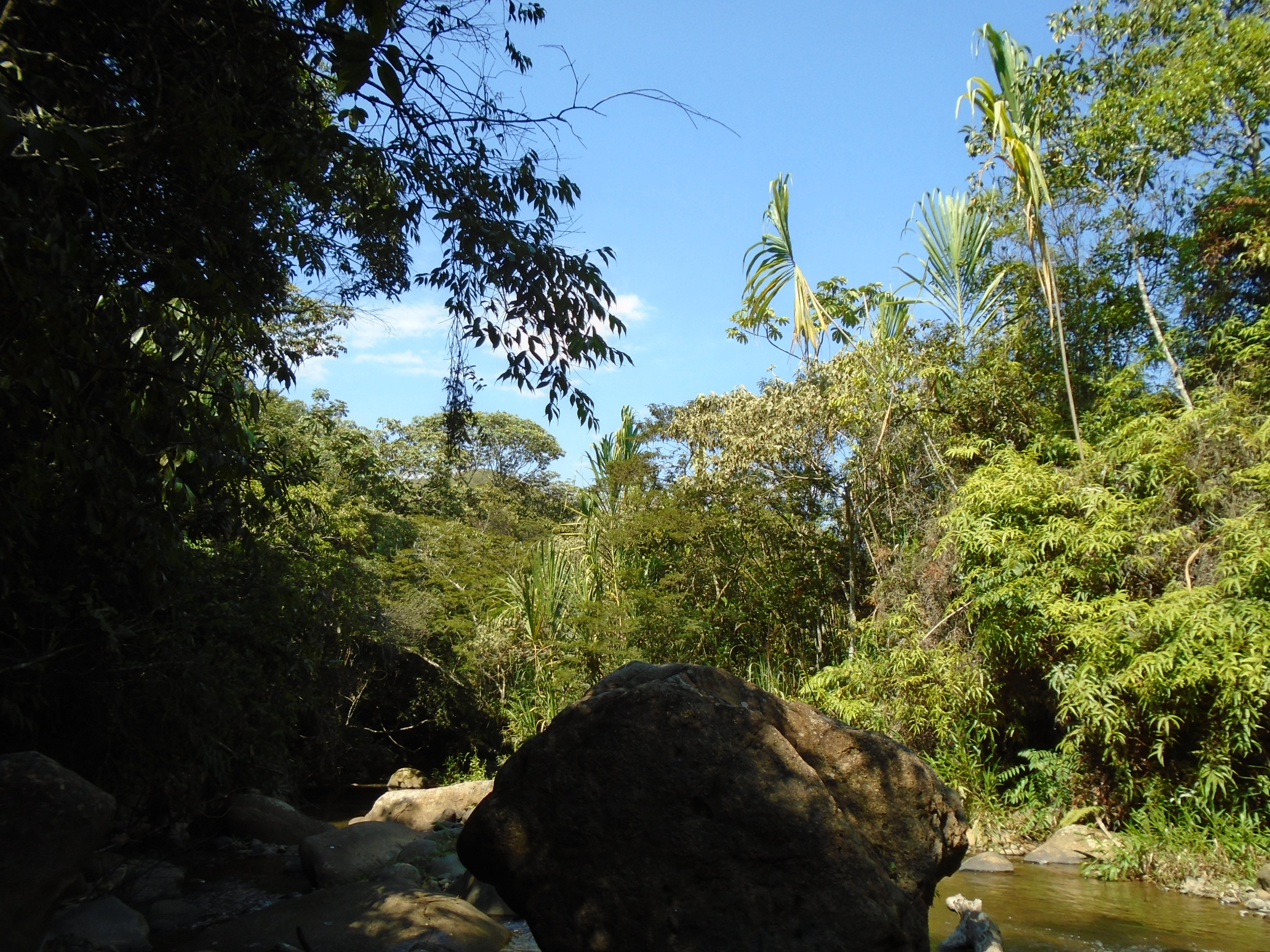
Nature in Jamundí

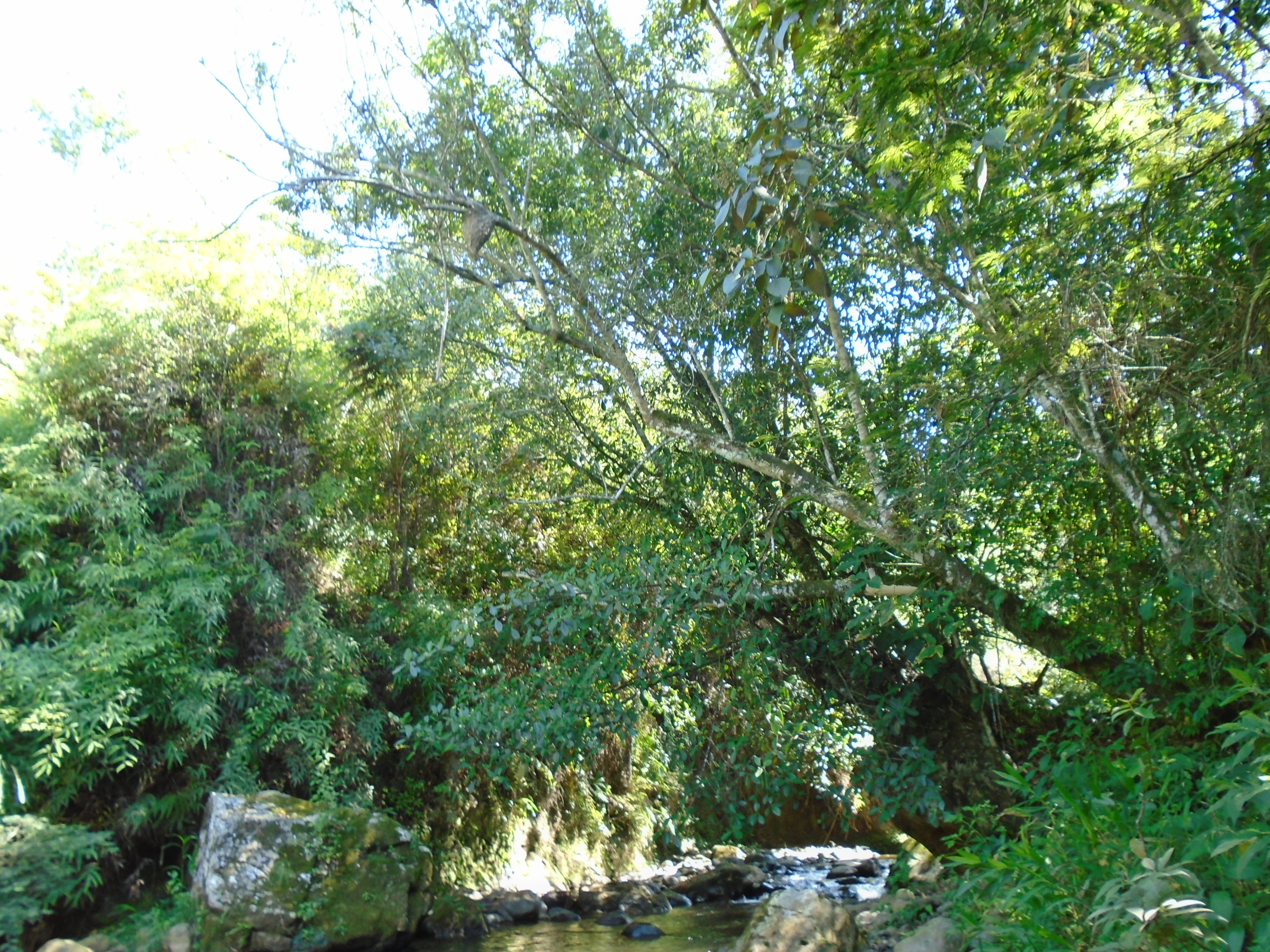
Nature

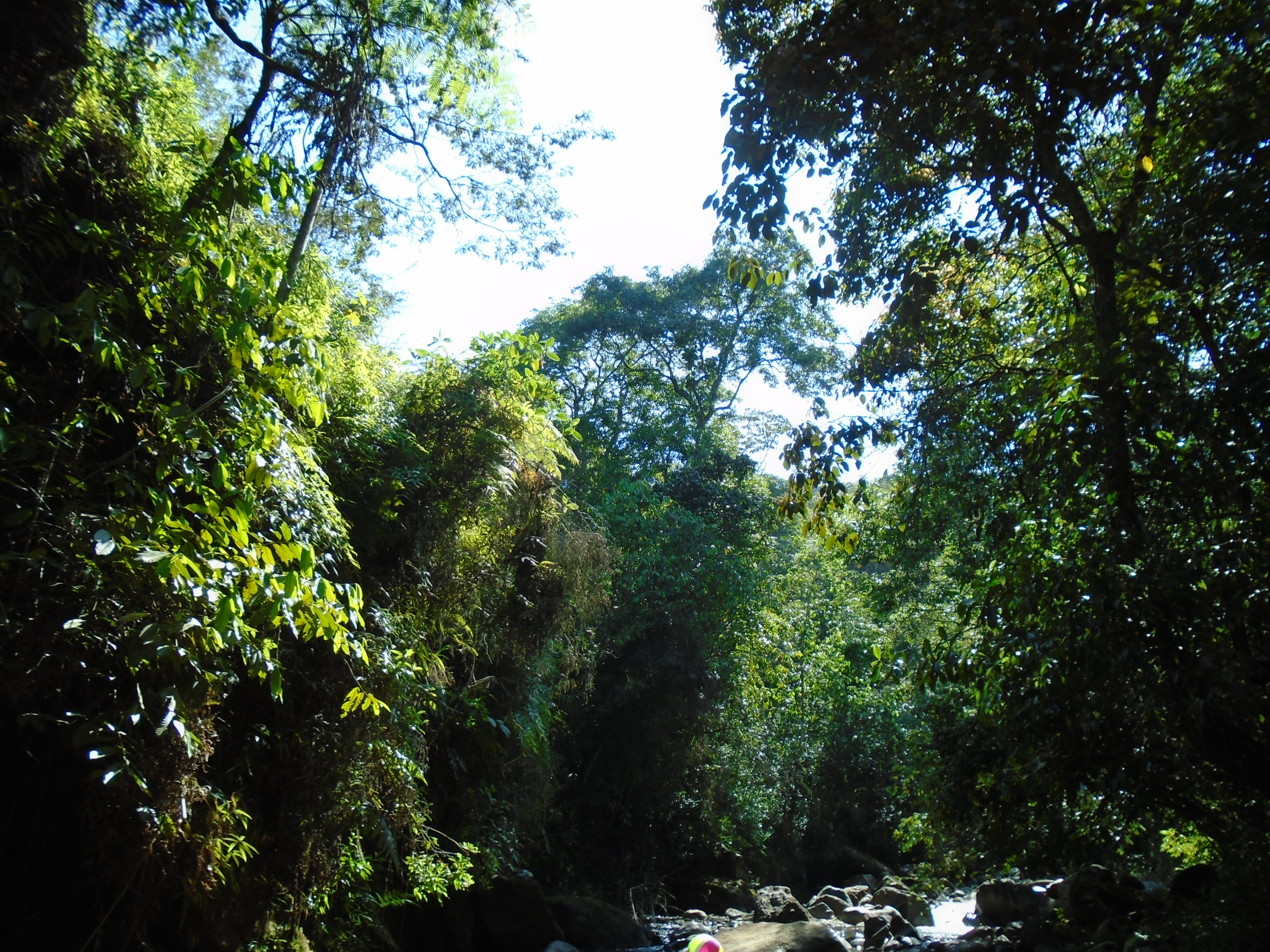
Nature

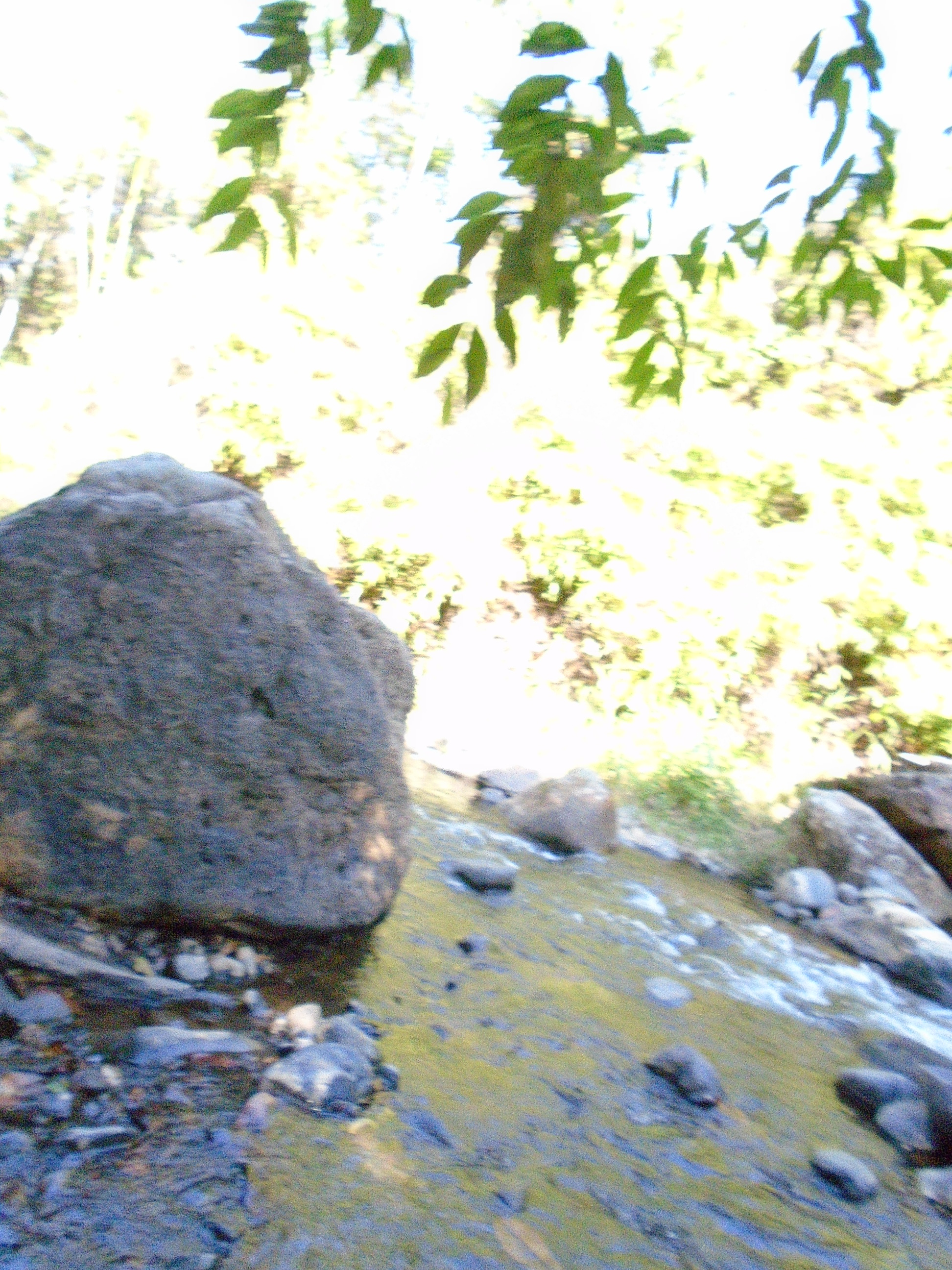
Nature
