= Instituto Mayor Campesino =

Coordinates: 3°52′18.11″N 76°17′55.03″W

- Abbreviation: IMCA
- Predecessor: Peasant University
- Established: 1962; 64 years ago
- Founder: Francisco Javier Mejía
- Director: Erminsu Iván David Pabón
- Affiliations: Jesuit, Catholic
- Website: IMCA

Instituto Mayor Campesino (IMCA) was founded by the Jesuits in Buga, Colombia, in 1962 to be of service to rural villagers. It has undertaken a wide variety of works over time for the integral development of workers and peasants.

== Activities ==
IMCA is currently involved in:

- Production and commercialization
- Organization
- Training
- Pastoral assistance
- Publishing
- Networking
