= Versalles =

Coordinates: 4°40′N 76°15′W

Versalles, Valle del Cauca
- Municipality and town

- Flag Coat of arms

- Location of the municipality and town of Versalles in the Valle del Cauca Department of Colombia.
- Country: Colombia
- Department: Valle del Cauca Department

Population (2015)
  - Total: 7,214
- Time zone: UTC-5 (Colombia Standard Time)

Versalles is a town and municipality located in the Department of Valle del Cauca, Colombia.

Versalles is a town near El Dovio and Roldanillo. It has a somewhat cooler climate than those towns, being situated at a higher altitude.
