= Restrepo, Valle del Cauca =

Coordinates: 3.825°N 76.525°W

- Municipality and town
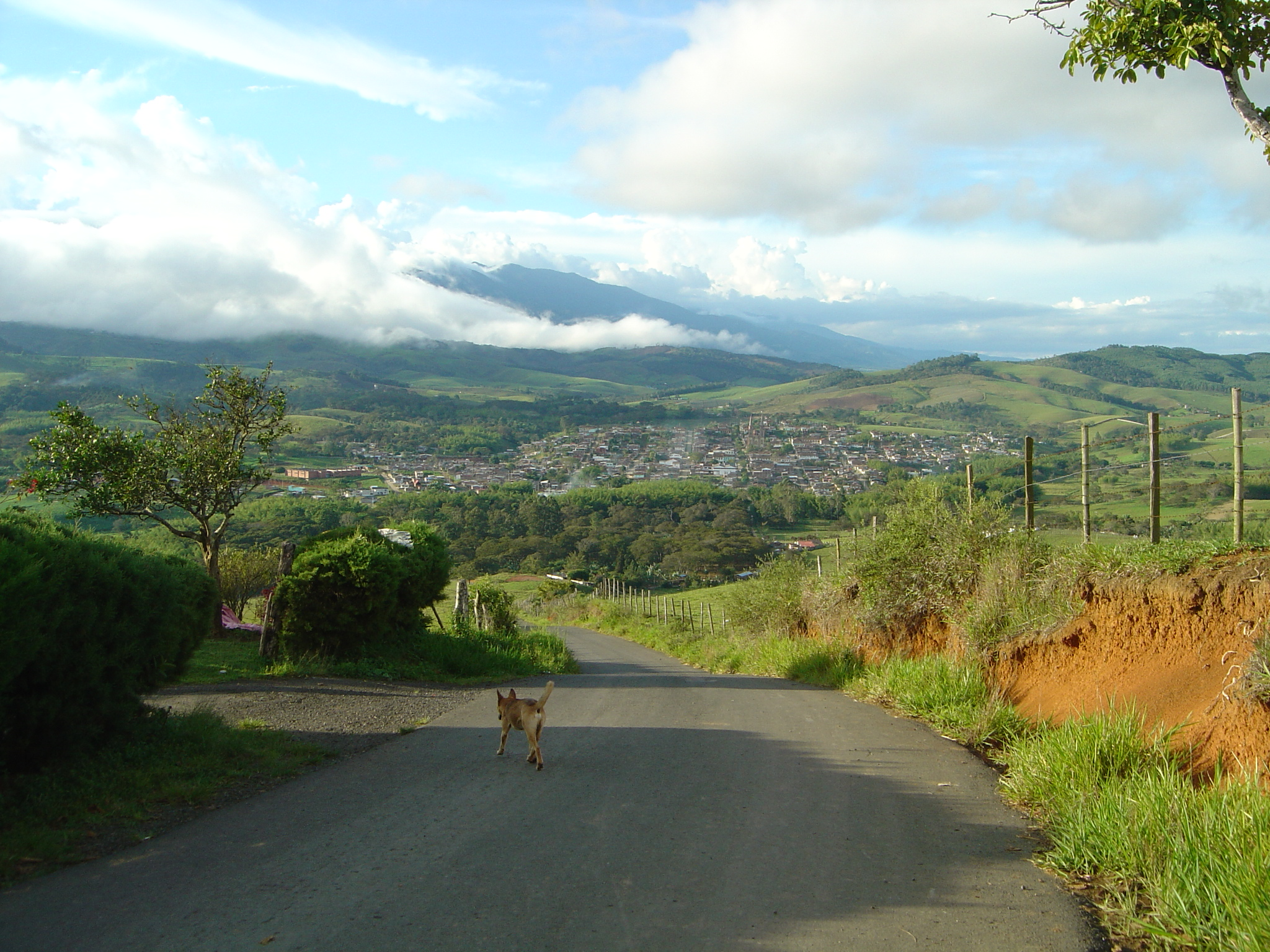

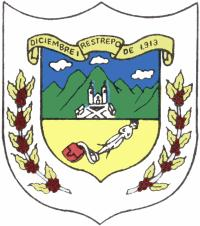
- Flag Coat of arms

- Location of the municipality and town of Restrepo, Valle del Cauca in the Valle del Cauca Department of Colombia
- Country: Colombia
- Department: Valle del Cauca Department

Area
  - Total: 135 km^{2} (52 sq mi)
- Elevation: 1,400 m (4,600 ft)

Population (2015)
  - Total: 16,227
  - Density: 120/km^{2} (311/sq mi)
- Time zone: UTC-5 (Colombia Standard Time)

Restrepo is a town and municipality located in the Department of Valle del Cauca, Colombia. It was founded December 1, 1913 by Julio Fernandez Medina, Anselmo Rendon Nicanor Grisales and other settlers. It has been a Municipality since April 3, 1925, under Ordinance No. 030 of the Departmental Assembly. Mostly mountainous, its major economic activities are agriculture and animal husbandry. Its key products are banana, pineapple, sugarcane, beans, fruits, vegetables, and corn.

== Climate ==
Climate data for Restrepo (Julio Fernandez), elevation 1,360 m (4,460 ft), (1981–2010)
Month	Jan	Feb	Mar	Apr	May	Jun	Jul	Aug	Sep	Oct	Nov	Dec	Year
Mean daily maximum °C (°F)	25.7 (78.3)	26.1 (79.0)	26.1 (79.0)	25.8 (78.4)	25.8 (78.4)	25.8 (78.4)	25.9 (78.6)	26.2 (79.2)	25.9 (78.6)	25.2 (77.4)	25.2 (77.4)	25.2 (77.4)	25.7 (78.3)
Daily mean °C (°F)	20.0 (68.0)	20.2 (68.4)	20.3 (68.5)	20.3 (68.5)	20.2 (68.4)	20.2 (68.4)	19.9 (67.8)	20.1 (68.2)	19.9 (67.8)	19.6 (67.3)	19.7 (67.5)	19.8 (67.6)	20.0 (68.0)
Mean daily minimum °C (°F)	16.6 (61.9)	16.6 (61.9)	16.7 (62.1)	16.8 (62.2)	16.9 (62.4)	16.6 (61.9)	16.1 (61.0)	16.4 (61.5)	16.3 (61.3)	16.4 (61.5)	16.4 (61.5)	16.5 (61.7)	16.5 (61.7)
Average precipitation mm (inches)	49.4 (1.94)	67.6 (2.66)	76.4 (3.01)	130.3 (5.13)	128.1 (5.04)	84.7 (3.33)	59.5 (2.34)	65.6 (2.58)	106.5 (4.19)	145.2 (5.72)	108.5 (4.27)	66.0 (2.60)	1,087.8 (42.83)
Average relative humidity (%)	78	77	78	80	80	79	78	78	78	80	80	80	79
Mean monthly sunshine hours	155.0	138.3	151.9	126.0	127.1	135.0	161.2	161.2	132.0	117.8	117.0	155.0	1,677.5
Mean daily sunshine hours	5.0	4.9	4.9	4.2	4.1	4.5	5.2	5.2	4.4	3.8	3.9	5	4.6
Source: Instituto de Hidrologia Meteorologia y Estudios Ambientales
