= Andalucía, Valle del Cauca =

Andalucía
- Municipality and town
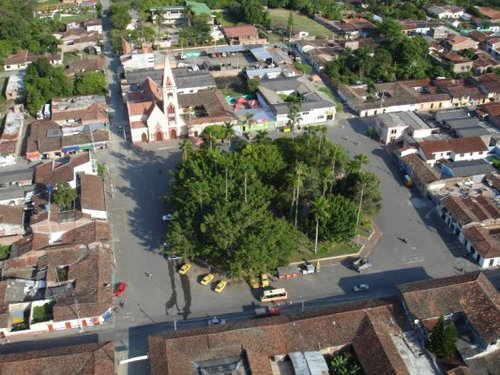

- Flag Coat of arms

- Location of the municipality and town of Andalucía, Valle del Cauca in the Valle del Cauca Department of Colombia.

- Location in Colombia
- Coordinates: 4°10′N 76°10′W
- Country: Colombia
- Department: Valle del Cauca Department

Area
  - Total: 168 km^{2} (65 sq mi)

Population (Census 2018)
  - Total: 18,132
  - Density: 108/km^{2} (280/sq mi)
- Time zone: UTC-5 (Colombia Standard Time)
- Climate: Af

Andalucía is a town and municipality located in the north of the Department of Valle del Cauca, in Colombia.
