= Juan de Ampudia =

Captain Juan de Ampudia (died 1541) was a Spanish explorer and conquistador.

He was born in Jérez de la Frontera, Spain. De Ampudia participated in the Spanish founding of many towns and cities. He took part in the conquests of Nicaragua, Perú, Ecuador and Colombia. De Ampudia accompanied Pedro de Alvarado to Perú and then took part of the foundation of the city of San Francisco de Quito on December 6, 1534. His name can be read in the atrium of the Metropolitan Cathedral in Quito.

Juan de Ampudia was, with Diego de Tapia, one of the first mayors (alcaldes) of the Quito city government. He also created the first tile factory on the side of a hill now called "El Tejar". He helped Sebastián de Belalcázar to pacify the area around Quito and killed Zopozopanqui, a local chieftain, leading to the rebellion against the Spanish. He died in Popayán.

Captain De Ampudia joined Pedro de Añasco's expedition and founded the town of Timbío on November 1, 1535. He undertook many expeditions down the Cauca River where he acquired the nom de guerre "Atila del Cauca". On December 24, 1536 he and his troops took the hill called El Azafate in order to secure the route that De Belalcázar would take to found the city of Popayán on January 13, 1537. Under orders from Benalcazar he went after the rebelling Captain Osorio and died of spear wounds on his way back to Popayán in 1541.
