= Omar Rayo =

Colombian painter, sculptor, caricaturist and plastic artist

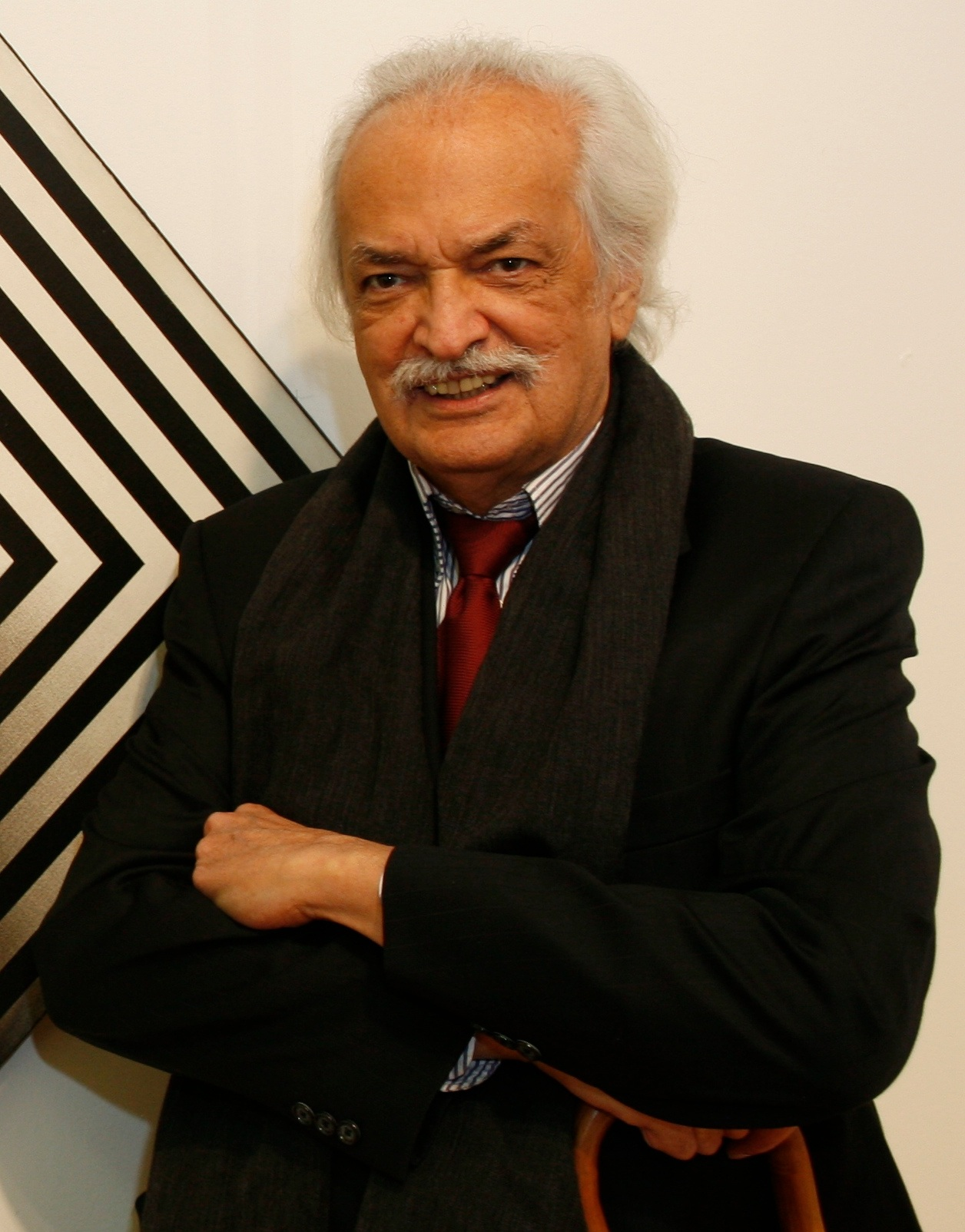
- Born: January 20, 1928; Roldanillo, Valle del Cauca
- Died: June 7, 2010 (aged 82); Palmira, Valle del Cauca
- Style: Shapes

Omar Rayo Reyes (January 20, 1928 – June 7, 2010) was a renowned Colombian painter, sculptor, caricaturist and plastic artist. He won the 1970 Salón de Artistas Colombianos. Rayo worked with abstract geometry primarily employing black, white, red and yellow. He was part of the Op Art movement. Rayo's work shows that geometric art is as much a part of the past as it is of the future. He used traces of the past to discover new ways to present visual and geometric sketches.

One of his most celebrated exhibitions was carried out in the National Room of the Museum of the Palace of fine arts of Mexico, titled "20 years, 100 works: Omar Rayo."

== Museum ==
The Museo Rayo de Dibujo y Grabado Latinoamericano was founded on January 20, 1981, by Rayo in his hometown of Roldanillo with funds the artist himself provided. The museum was also funded with help from the Colombian government and others so that this site would remain a permanent exhibit of his works of art during the late 1980s. The museum was designed by Mexican architect Leopoldo Gout and opened with a collection of 2,000 of Rayo's artwork and some 500 other Latin American artists' works. The museum contains a library, many modules for expositions, a graphic arts workshop and a theater. Sadly government care has been diminishing, and Miss Agueda Pizarro had found a hard time carrying by with financial sustainment. Several activities are carried out by the foundation of the museum's for promoting arts in the region.

== Personal life ==
Rayo met New York-born poet Águeda Pizarro, almost fourteen years his junior, in New York in 1963. At the time Rayo was dating a friend of hers from university, but Rayo soon began going out with Pizarro instead, and she moved in with him in 1968. The couple divided their time between New York and Roldanillo, spending six months in each place. Their daughter Sara was born in 1977, at which point they made the decision to marry. Sara Rayo is now a successful artist in her own right.

== Death ==
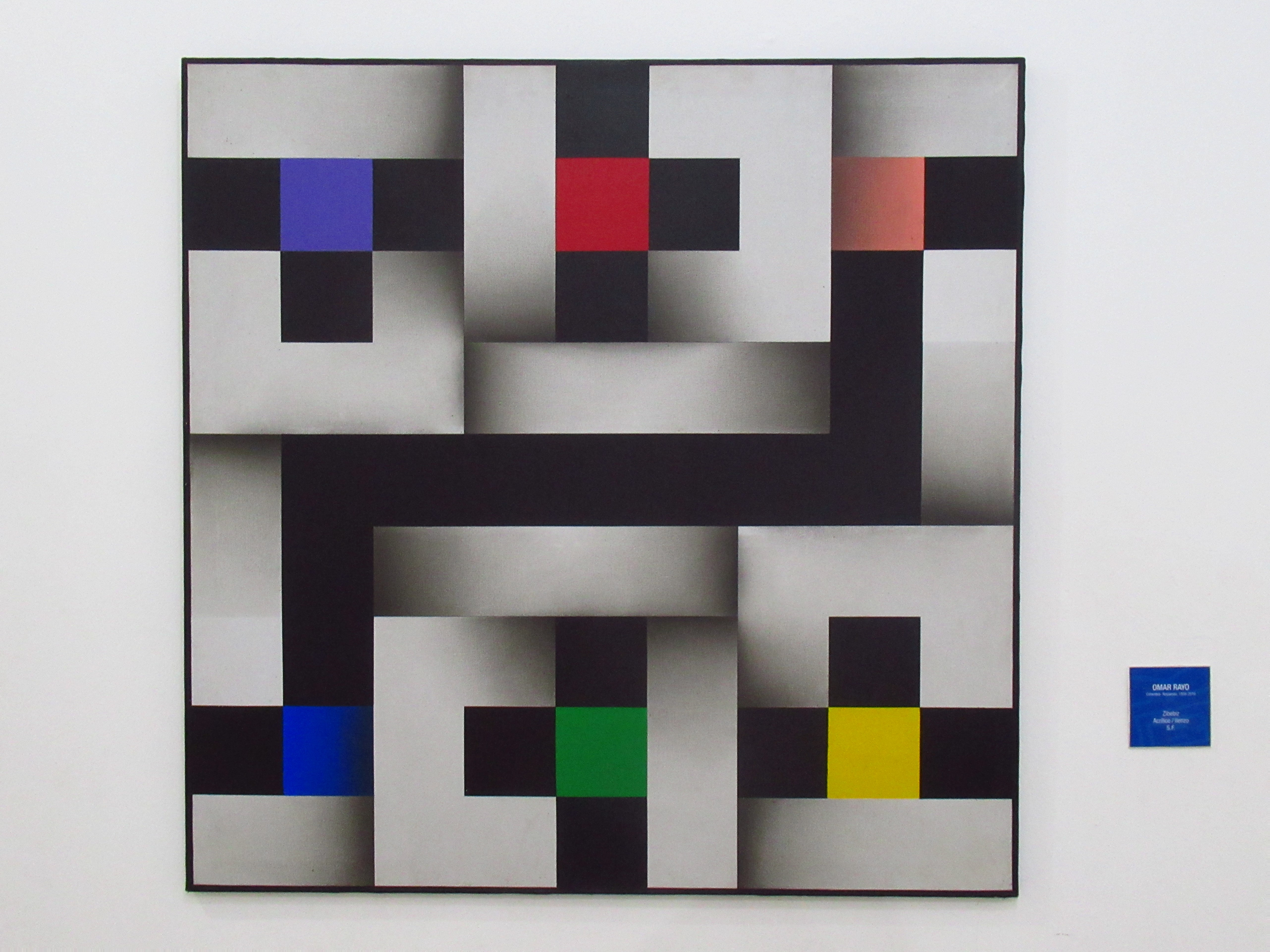
Zibebiz (1994), in the Museo Bolivariano de Arte Contemporaneo.

Rayo suffered his first heart attack in 1998, and a more serious one in January 2006, which resulted in him spending 30 hours in a coma before recovering.

On the morning on June 7, 2010, Rayo collapsed during breakfast at his home in Roldanillo, according to the testimony of one of his assistants, Alejandro Mendoza. At the time his wife Águeda and daughter Sara were at Sara's home in Cali. Rayo was taken to the local hospital where the cause of the collapse was identified as another heart attack. At the hospital he was resuscitated and transferred by ambulance to a hospital in the departmental capital Cali, but during the journey near the city of Palmira, Rayo's condition deteriorated and his vital signs were lost; he was pronounced dead on arrival at the Valle de Lili hospital in Cali.

== Tribute ==
On January 20, 2012, Google celebrated Rayo's 84th birthday with a Google Doodle.
