= La Unión, Valle del Cauca =

La Unión
- Municipality and town
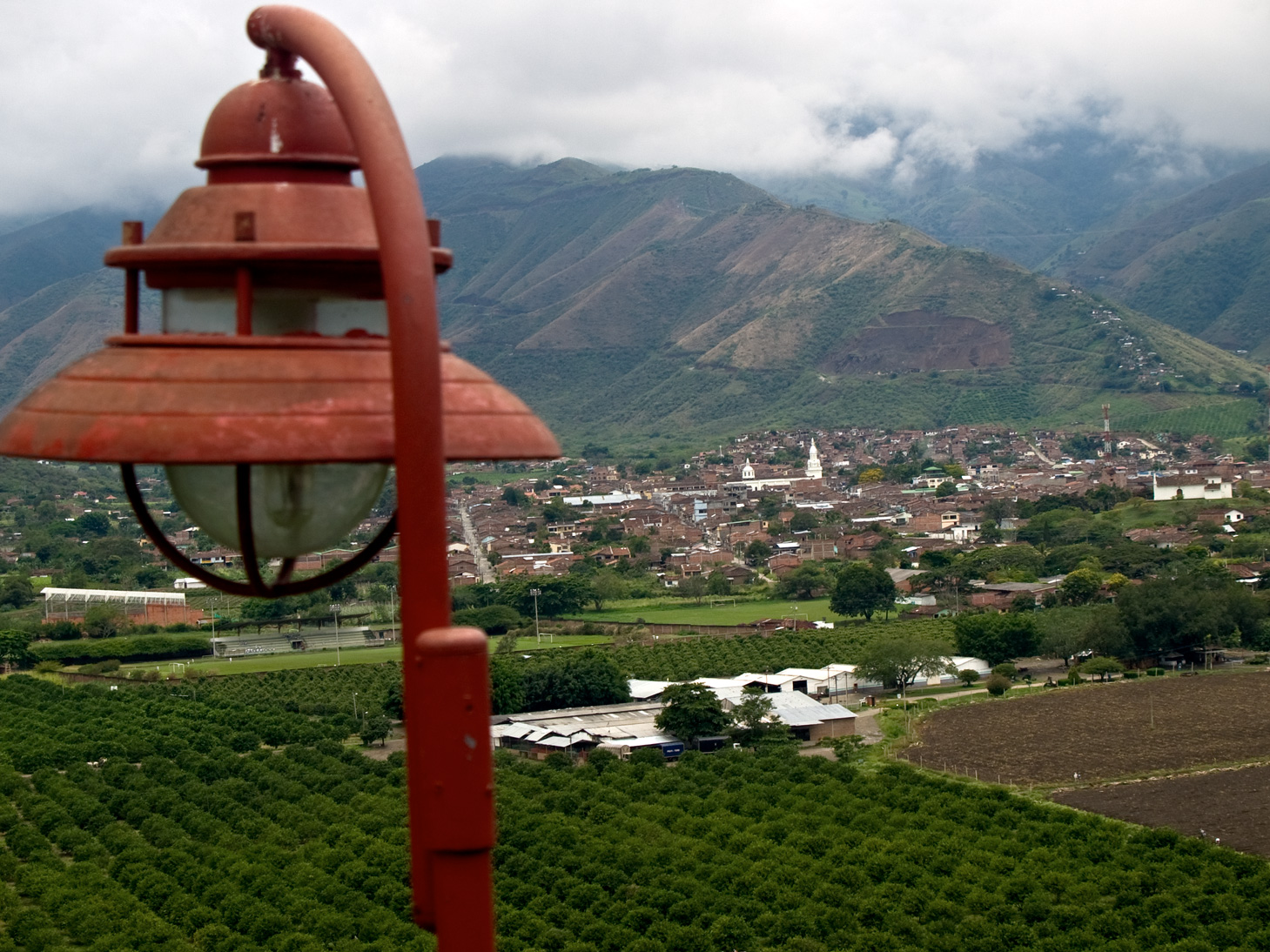

- Flag Coat of arms

- La Unión is a small town located in the north of the Valle del Cauca's department in Colombia. It is recognized for being one of the biggest producers of tropical fruits in the country. It is also famous for its vineyards and production of wine.

- Location in Colombia
- Coordinates: 3°39′14″N 76°34′20″W
- Country: Colombia
- Department: Valle del Cauca Department

Area
  - Municipality and town: 120.9 km^{2} (46.7 sq mi)
  - Urban: 4.16 km^{2} (1.61 sq mi)

Population (2020 est.)
  - Municipality and town: 34,493
  - Density: 285.3/km^{2} (738.9/sq mi)
  - Urban: 27,603
  - Urban density: 6,640/km^{2} (17,200/sq mi)
- Time zone: UTC-5 (Colombia Standard Time)

La Unión is a town and municipality located in the Department of Valle del Cauca, Colombia. The town, home to Casa Grajales, the country’s largest wine producer, is known for its grapes.

== Climate ==
Climate data for La Unión (Cent Admo La Union), elevation 920 m (3,020 ft), (1981–2010)
| Month | Jan | Feb | Mar | Apr | May | Jun | Jul | Aug | Sep | Oct | Nov | Dec | Year |
|---|---|---|---|---|---|---|---|---|---|---|---|---|---|
| Mean daily maximum °C (°F) | 31.1 (88.0) | 31.6 (88.9) | 31.4 (88.5) | 30.4 (86.7) | 29.7 (85.5) | 30.2 (86.4) | 31.0 (87.8) | 31.8 (89.2) | 31.0 (87.8) | 30.0 (86.0) | 29.4 (84.9) | 30.1 (86.2) | 30.6 (87.1) |
| Daily mean °C (°F) | 24.4 (75.9) | 24.8 (76.6) | 24.9 (76.8) | 24.4 (75.9) | 24.1 (75.4) | 24.1 (75.4) | 24.4 (75.9) | 24.7 (76.5) | 24.3 (75.7) | 23.8 (74.8) | 23.7 (74.7) | 24.0 (75.2) | 24.3 (75.7) |
| Mean daily minimum °C (°F) | 18.6 (65.5) | 18.8 (65.8) | 19.1 (66.4) | 19.3 (66.7) | 19.2 (66.6) | 18.8 (65.8) | 18.3 (64.9) | 18.3 (64.9) | 18.5 (65.3) | 18.8 (65.8) | 18.9 (66.0) | 18.7 (65.7) | 18.8 (65.8) |
| Average precipitation mm (inches) | 44.5 (1.75) | 63.9 (2.52) | 97.0 (3.82) | 144.0 (5.67) | 143.7 (5.66) | 85.8 (3.38) | 77.9 (3.07) | 77.0 (3.03) | 106.7 (4.20) | 116.9 (4.60) | 104.7 (4.12) | 60.8 (2.39) | 1,123.1 (44.22) |
| Average precipitation days | 8 | 9 | 13 | 16 | 16 | 12 | 10 | 10 | 15 | 17 | 14 | 10 | 150 |
| Average relative humidity (%) | 73 | 71 | 72 | 75 | 77 | 76 | 72 | 70 | 73 | 75 | 75 | 74 | 74 |
| Mean monthly sunshine hours | 151.9 | 135.5 | 151.9 | 129.0 | 136.4 | 138.0 | 182.9 | 182.9 | 147.0 | 136.4 | 132.0 | 139.5 | 1,763.4 |
| Mean daily sunshine hours | 4.9 | 4.8 | 4.9 | 4.3 | 4.4 | 4.6 | 5.9 | 5.9 | 4.9 | 4.4 | 4.4 | 4.5 | 4.8 |
Source: Instituto de Hidrologia Meteorologia y Estudios Ambientales
