= Bolívar, Valle del Cauca =

Bolívar
- Municipality and town
- Flag Coat of arms

- Location of the municipality and town of Bolívar, Valle del Cauca in the Valle del Cauca Department of Colombia.

- Location in Colombia
- Coordinates: 4°20′19″N 76°11′5″W
- Country: Colombia
- Department: Valle del Cauca Department

Area
  - Total: 602 km^{2} (232 sq mi)

Population (Census 2018)
  - Total: 13,954
  - Density: 23.2/km^{2} (60.0/sq mi)
- Time zone: UTC-5 (Colombia Standard Time)
- Climate: Am

Bolívar is a town and municipality located in the Department of Valle del Cauca, Colombia.

Ricaurte, a village within the municipality of Bolívar, is home to the world's largest known cluster of people with fragile X syndrome. Around 5% of the village population carries the genetic mutation or premutation.

== Notable people ==
- Fanor Mondragón, Colombian chemist, professor and researcher
