= Obando, Valle del Cauca =

Coordinates: 4°35′N 75°55′W

- Municipality and town
- Flag Coat of arms

- Location of the municipality and town of Obando, Valle del Cauca in the Valle del Cauca Department of Colombia.
- Country: Colombia
- Department: Valle del Cauca Department

Area
  - Total: 171 km^{2} (66 sq mi)

Population (Census 2018)
  - Total: 10,970
  - Density: 64.2/km^{2} (166/sq mi)
- Time zone: UTC-5 (Colombia Standard Time)

Obando is a town and municipality located in the Department of Valle del Cauca, Colombia.
