= Roldanillo =

Coordinates: 4°25′N 76°09′W

- Municipality and town
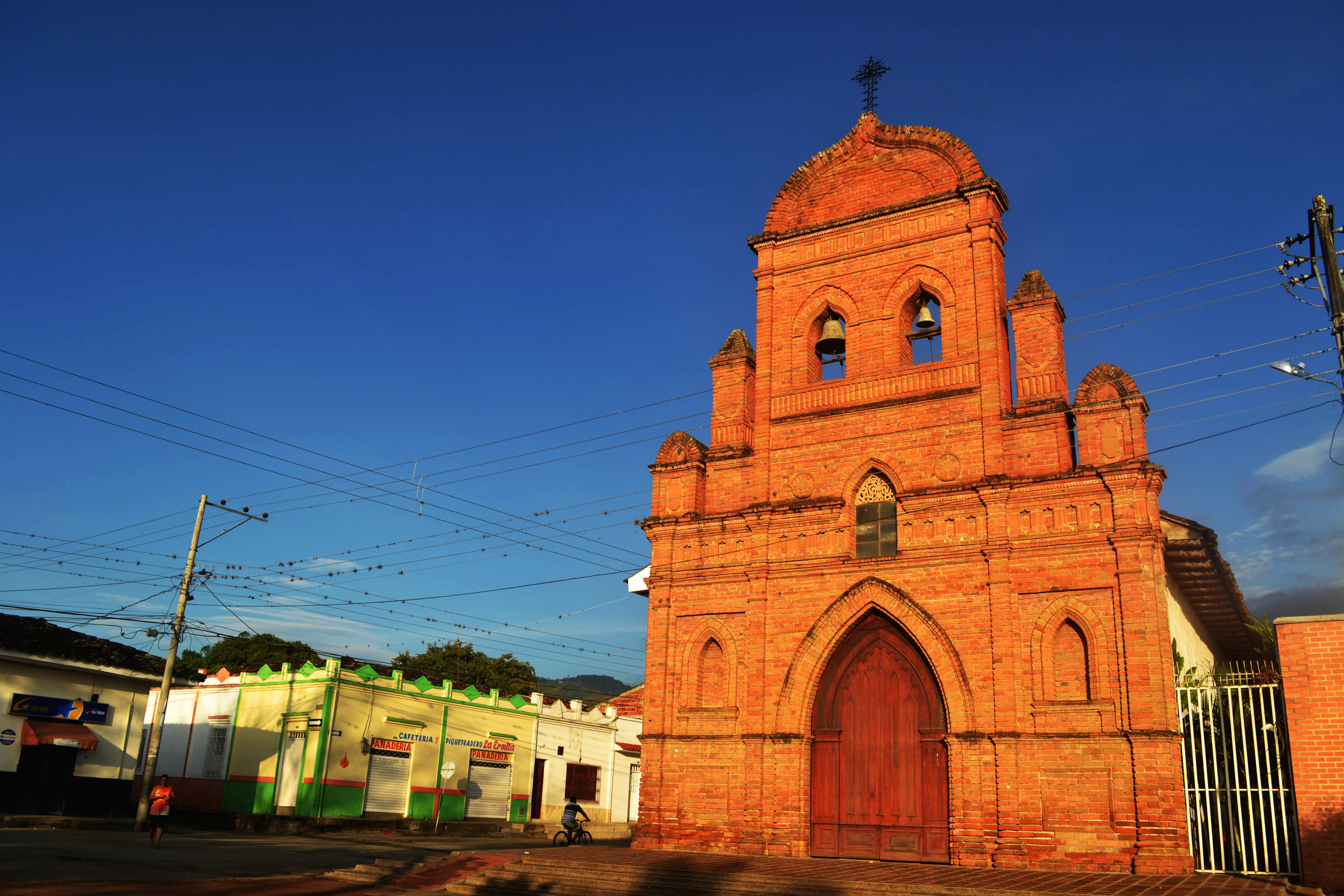
- Chapel of the Ermita in Roldanillo

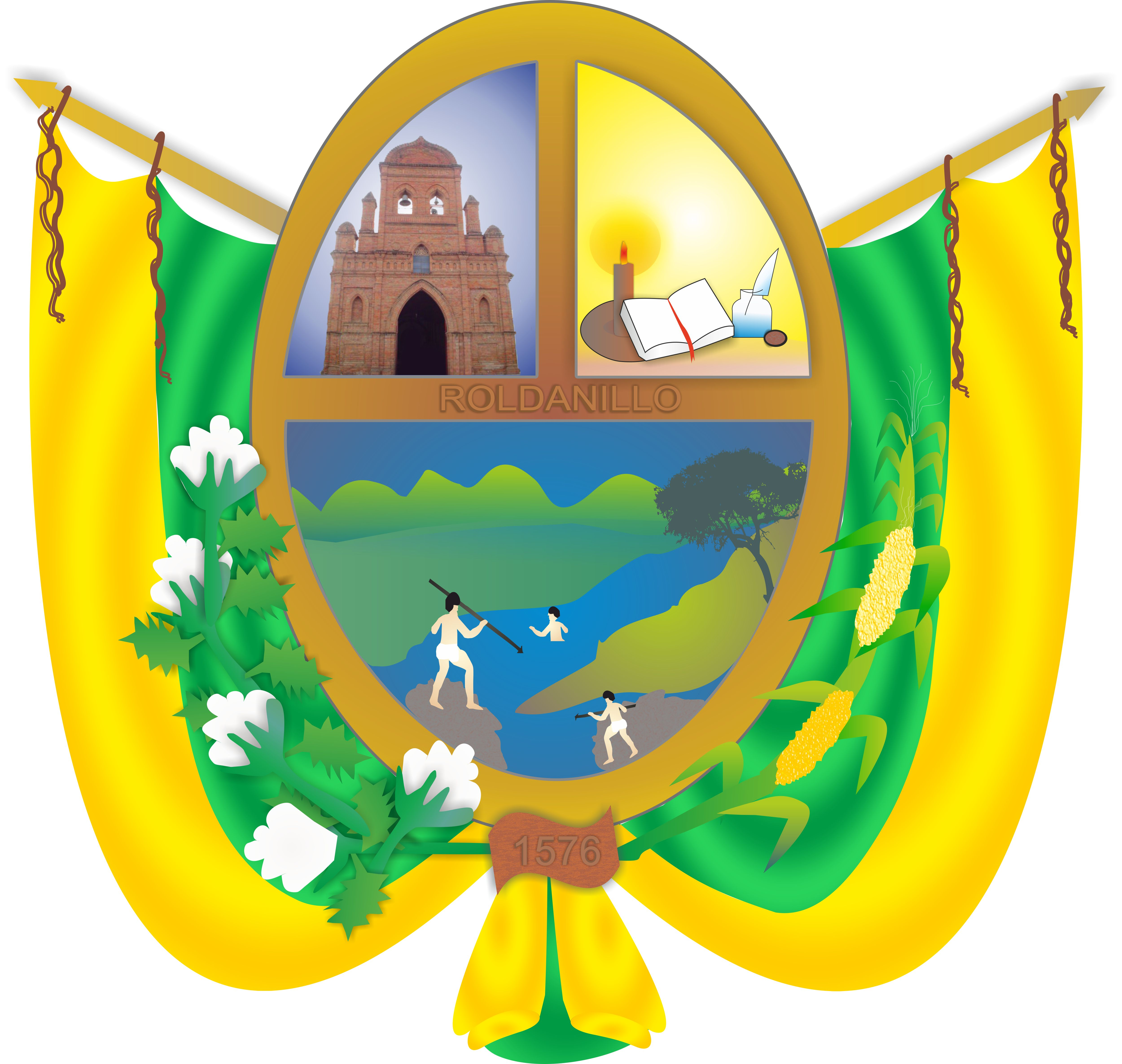
- Flag Coat of arms

- Location of the municipality and town of Roldanillo in the Valle del Cauca Department of Colombia.
- Country: Colombia
- Department: Valle del Cauca Department

Area
  - Municipality and town: 235.7 km^{2} (91.0 sq mi)
  - Urban: 4.57 km^{2} (1.76 sq mi)

Population (2018 census)
  - Municipality and town: 36,797
  - Density: 156.1/km^{2} (404.3/sq mi)
  - Urban: 27,626
  - Urban density: 6,050/km^{2} (15,700/sq mi)
- Time zone: UTC-5 (Colombia Standard Time)

Roldanillo is a town and municipality located in the Department of Valle del Cauca, Colombia.

It is also a tourist hot spot and known as Colombia's flying capital. It has hosted a range of international competitions, including the paragliding world cup superfinals.

Roldanillo's Occidente bus terminal has service to Cali, Rozo, Tulua, Buga, Armenia, Cartago, and Pereira, as well as nearby towns such as Zarzal, El Dovio, Naranjal, La Union, Sevilla, Andalucia, Primavera, and La Tulia.

== Notable residents ==
- Omar Rayo

== Climate ==
Climate data for Roldanillo (Tierrablanca), elevation 930 m (3,050 ft), (1971–2000)
Month	Jan	Feb	Mar	Apr	May	Jun	Jul	Aug	Sep	Oct	Nov	Dec	Year
Mean daily maximum °C (°F)	31.1 (88.0)	31.6 (88.9)	31.4 (88.5)	30.5 (86.9)	30.0 (86.0)	30.4 (86.7)	31.2 (88.2)	31.5 (88.7)	31.0 (87.8)	29.8 (85.6)	29.8 (85.6)	30.2 (86.4)	30.7 (87.3)
Daily mean °C (°F)	24.5 (76.1)	24.7 (76.5)	24.8 (76.6)	24.5 (76.1)	24.2 (75.6)	24.2 (75.6)	24.5 (76.1)	24.6 (76.3)	24.4 (75.9)	23.9 (75.0)	23.8 (74.8)	24.2 (75.6)	24.4 (75.9)
Mean daily minimum °C (°F)	18.8 (65.8)	19.1 (66.4)	19.5 (67.1)	19.6 (67.3)	19.4 (66.9)	19.0 (66.2)	18.5 (65.3)	18.8 (65.8)	18.9 (66.0)	19.0 (66.2)	19.0 (66.2)	18.9 (66.0)	19.0 (66.2)
Average precipitation mm (inches)	44.6 (1.76)	55.1 (2.17)	88.3 (3.48)	107.0 (4.21)	122.4 (4.82)	84.7 (3.33)	68.5 (2.70)	73.2 (2.88)	98.0 (3.86)	124.3 (4.89)	83.8 (3.30)	65.0 (2.56)	1,014.9 (39.96)
Average precipitation days	8	10	13	17	19	14	10	12	16	19	15	12	165
Average relative humidity (%)	72	71	72	74	76	75	72	71	72	76	76	74	73
Mean monthly sunshine hours	192.2	163.9	179.8	147.0	158.1	174.0	213.9	189.1	171.0	151.9	156.0	173.6	2,070.5
Mean daily sunshine hours	6.2	5.8	5.8	4.9	5.1	5.8	6.9	6.1	5.7	4.9	5.2	5.6	5.7
Source: Instituto de Hidrologia Meteorologia y Estudios Ambientales
