= Diego de Tapia Aldana =

Spanish friar and philosopher

Diego de Tapia Aldana was a friar, philosopher and writer from Spain from the house of Uclés in the 16th century.

== Biography ==
Diego was a presbyter and canon regular in the Order of Santiago in the convent in Úcles, a town in Spain.

He was celebrated in his data for his erudition and wisdom. He was a student at the University of Salamanca, and he wrote various works

- Dialogus de triplici bono et vent homini nobilitate.., Salmanticae, Excudebat Cornelius Bonardus, 1588.
- Philemon dialogus,..., Salamanca, 1588, folio.
