= Buga, Valle del Cauca =

Guadalajara de Buga Buga
- Municipality and city
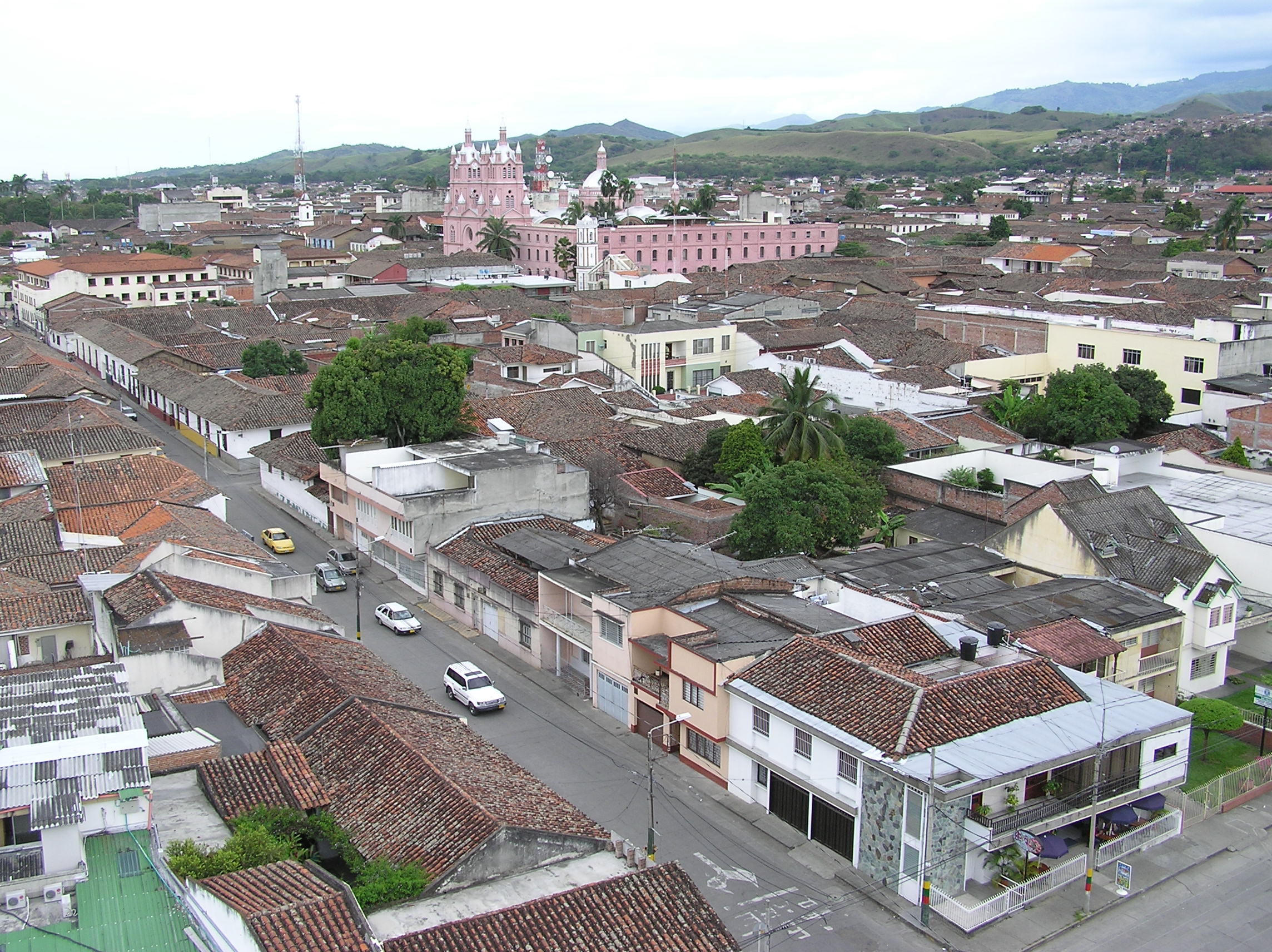

- Flag Coat of arms
- Nickname: Ciudad Señora
- Location of the municipality and town of Buga, Valle del Cauca in the Valle del Cauca Department of Colombia.

- Location in Colombia
- Coordinates: 03°54′00″N 76°18′07″W
- Country: Colombia
- Department: Valle del Cauca Department
- Founded: March 4th, 1570
- Incorporated: 1884

Government
  - Mayor: Karol Vanessa Martinez Silva

Area
  - Municipality and city: 825.9 km^{2} (318.9 sq mi)
  - Urban: 11.53 km^{2} (4.45 sq mi)
- Elevation: 969 m (3,179 ft)

Population (2020 est.)
  - Municipality and city: 128,945
  - Density: 156.1/km^{2} (404.4/sq mi)
  - Urban: 109,753
  - Urban density: 9,519/km^{2} (24,650/sq mi)
- Demonym: Bugueño
- Time zone: UTC-5 (Colombia Standard Time)
- Area code: 57 + 2
- Website: Official website (in Spanish)

Buga (Spanish pronunciation: [ˈbuɣa]), formally Guadalajara de Buga, is a city and municipality in the Valle del Cauca Department of Colombia. It is famous for its Basilica del Señor de los Milagros, which houses an image of Christ called el Señor de los Milagros ("the Lord of the Miracles").

Buga is a city with a cattle industry. It is located 46 mi (74 km) from Cali.

== History ==
Guadalajara de Buga, which is the city's formal name, is one of the oldest cities in Colombia; founded in 1555 by Giraldo Gil de Estupiñán under the order of the Spanish conquistador Sebastián de Belalcázar and known as Buga la Real ("the Royal Buga") or La Ciudad Señora ("the Lady City"). It was the home of many wealthy families coming from Spain and settling in the New World.

King Philip II of Spain gave Guadalajara de Buga its city status officially at the end of the 16th century and also granted its coat of arms for the many services rendered to the crown. During colonial era, Buga was in the Royal Audience of Quito, initially part of the Viceroyalty of Peru, and from 1739 until the creation of the Republic of La Gran Colombia, part of the Viceroyalty of Nueva Granada. After the dissolution of the Gran Colombia, it became part of the Republic of Nueva Granada (modern-day Colombia, since the newly created Ecuador, successor of the Royal Audience of Quito, did not summon representatives from Cauca to its first congress.

During the years of Independence, Simón Bolívar, called el libertador ("the liberator"), visited the city on two occasions, for which commemoration plates were placed.

American Airlines Flight 965 crashed into a mountain near Buga on 20 December 1995.

In 2013, Buga became the first municipality in the Valle del Cauca department to be named a Pueblo Patrimonio (heritage town) of Colombia. As of March 2021, it remains both the southernmost and westernmost town in the Pueblo Patrimonio network.

== Demographics ==
It has a population of approximately 127,547 inhabitants, according to the 2018 census.

=== Ethnography ===
- Mix of White and Indigenous & whites (91.6%)
- Blacks or Afro-Colombians (8.3%)
- Amerindians or indigenous (0.1%)

== Culture ==
Currently the city receives over 3 million pilgrims per year to visit the Basilica of The Lord of the Miracles.

There is the cultural centre (Casa de la cultura) that offers art and literary training. It is an old-style house located on 6th Street 11-11, open since 1962. Buga is also famous for "The Holy Water Ale Brewing Company," one of the only hostel, microbrewery combination destinations in South America. Run by Colombian/German staff the Hostel can provide service in 3 different languages.

The city is also host to the NGO Instituto Mayor Campesino (IMCA) that assists in the development of farming communities.

== Twin city ==
- Guadalajara, Castile-La Mancha, Spain

== Climate ==
Climate data for Buga (Vinculo El), elevation 979 m (3,212 ft), (1981–2010)
Month	Jan	Feb	Mar	Apr	May	Jun	Jul	Aug	Sep	Oct	Nov	Dec	Year
Mean daily maximum °C (°F)	30.2 (86.4)	30.3 (86.5)	30.4 (86.7)	29.5 (85.1)	29.4 (84.9)	29.4 (84.9)	29.9 (85.8)	30.5 (86.9)	30.2 (86.4)	29.6 (85.3)	29.3 (84.7)	29.6 (85.3)	29.9 (85.8)
Daily mean °C (°F)	23.7 (74.7)	24.0 (75.2)	24.0 (75.2)	23.6 (74.5)	23.5 (74.3)	23.4 (74.1)	23.7 (74.7)	24.0 (75.2)	23.8 (74.8)	23.2 (73.8)	23.1 (73.6)	23.3 (73.9)	23.6 (74.5)
Mean daily minimum °C (°F)	18.6 (65.5)	18.7 (65.7)	19.1 (66.4)	19.1 (66.4)	19.2 (66.6)	18.9 (66.0)	18.7 (65.7)	18.7 (65.7)	18.7 (65.7)	18.7 (65.7)	18.7 (65.7)	18.7 (65.7)	18.8 (65.8)
Average precipitation mm (inches)	65.6 (2.58)	73.3 (2.89)	124.0 (4.88)	155.6 (6.13)	123.5 (4.86)	68.1 (2.68)	50.7 (2.00)	60.2 (2.37)	101.7 (4.00)	164.9 (6.49)	133.8 (5.27)	85.0 (3.35)	1,206.3 (47.49)
Average precipitation days	11	12	14	18	17	13	11	11	15	19	17	13	169
Average relative humidity (%)	76	75	76	80	81	80	76	74	76	78	80	79	78
Mean monthly sunshine hours	176.7	158.1	158.1	135.0	139.5	153.0	179.8	173.6	144.0	148.8	144.0	161.2	1,871.8
Mean daily sunshine hours	5.7	5.6	5.1	4.5	4.5	5.1	5.8	5.6	4.8	4.8	4.8	5.2	5.1
Source: Instituto de Hidrologia Meteorologia y Estudios Ambientales
