= Toro, Valle del Cauca =

Coordinates: 4°36′42″N 76°04′53″W

Toro
- Municipality and town
- Flag Coat of arms

- Location of the municipality and town of Toro in the Valle del Cauca Department of Colombia
- Country: Colombia
- Department: Valle del Cauca Department
- Founded: 3 June 1537
- Founder: Melchor Velásquez de Valdenebro

Area
  - Total: 166 km^{2} (64 sq mi)
- Elevation: 950 m (3,120 ft)

Population (2015)
  - Total: 16,394
  - Density: 98.8/km^{2} (256/sq mi)
- Time zone: UTC-5 (Colombia Standard Time)

Toro is a city and municipality located in the north of the department of Valle del Cauca, Colombia. The climate is warm.

== Etymology ==
It is believed that Toro is called because among the conquerors who visited the region were people born in Toro province of Zamora in Spain.

== History ==
Toro was founded on June 3, 1537 by Melchor Velásquez de Valdenebro.

== Economy ==
The base of the economy is agriculture, animal husbandry and mining, have recently been intensified cultivation of sugar cane, grape and passion fruit, especially those of coffee, bananas, beans, cassava, cotton, sorghum and vegetables. The cultivation of coffee is highlighted by becoming a monoculture farms in the hillside.

In Toro is San Juan Bautista Chapel, which has about 450 years. Still retains the niches of wood, some religious images of great beauty, expository and the missal of the time. There is an original painting of San Juan Bautista that belongs to the altar. Still retains the choir and the pulpit.

== Other characteristics ==
Average temperature: 23 degrees Celsius (73 °F)
Area: 166 km² (64 mi²)
Population: 19,076
Cali distance: 175 km (108 mi)
Date of incorporation: 1632 (Order of Apr. 26)
Major rivers: Toro, Induque and San Lazaro
Economic activity: agriculture, livestock and mining
Main products: cane sugar, corn, cotton, quartz, and gold
Tourist attractions: Cultural events on the anniversary of the town, San Juán Bautista chapel, and the Ecological Path
Fairs and festivals: Anniversary in August and Cinetoro, International Experimental Film Festival
Basic infrastructure: 4 colleges, 33 schools, banks, hospitals, and library
