= Valle del Cauca Department =

Department of western Colombia

Department of Valle del Cauca Departamento del Valle del Cauca
- Department
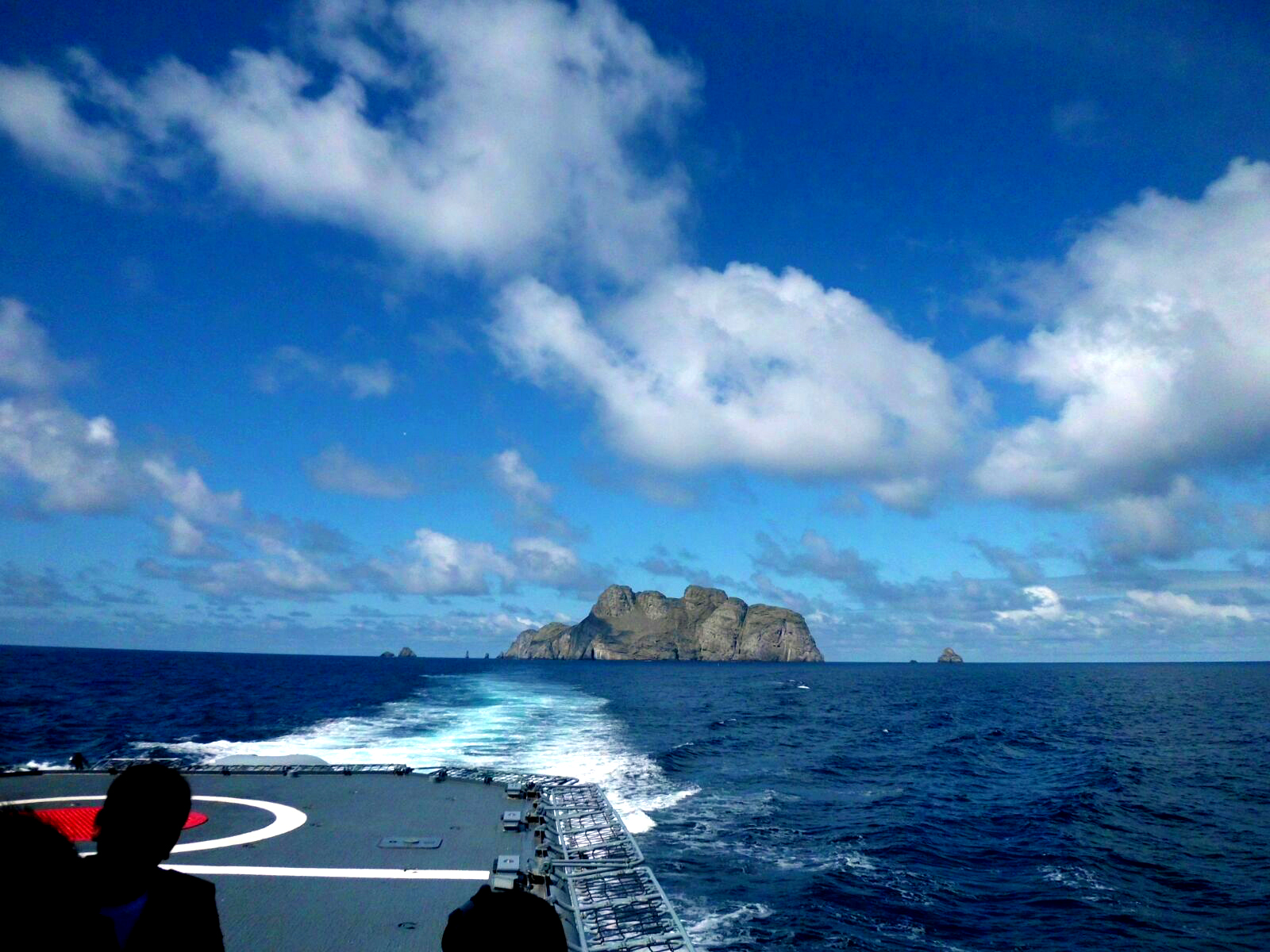
- Malpelo Island

- Flag Coat of arms
- Anthem: Himno al Valle del Cauca
- Valle del Cauca shown in red

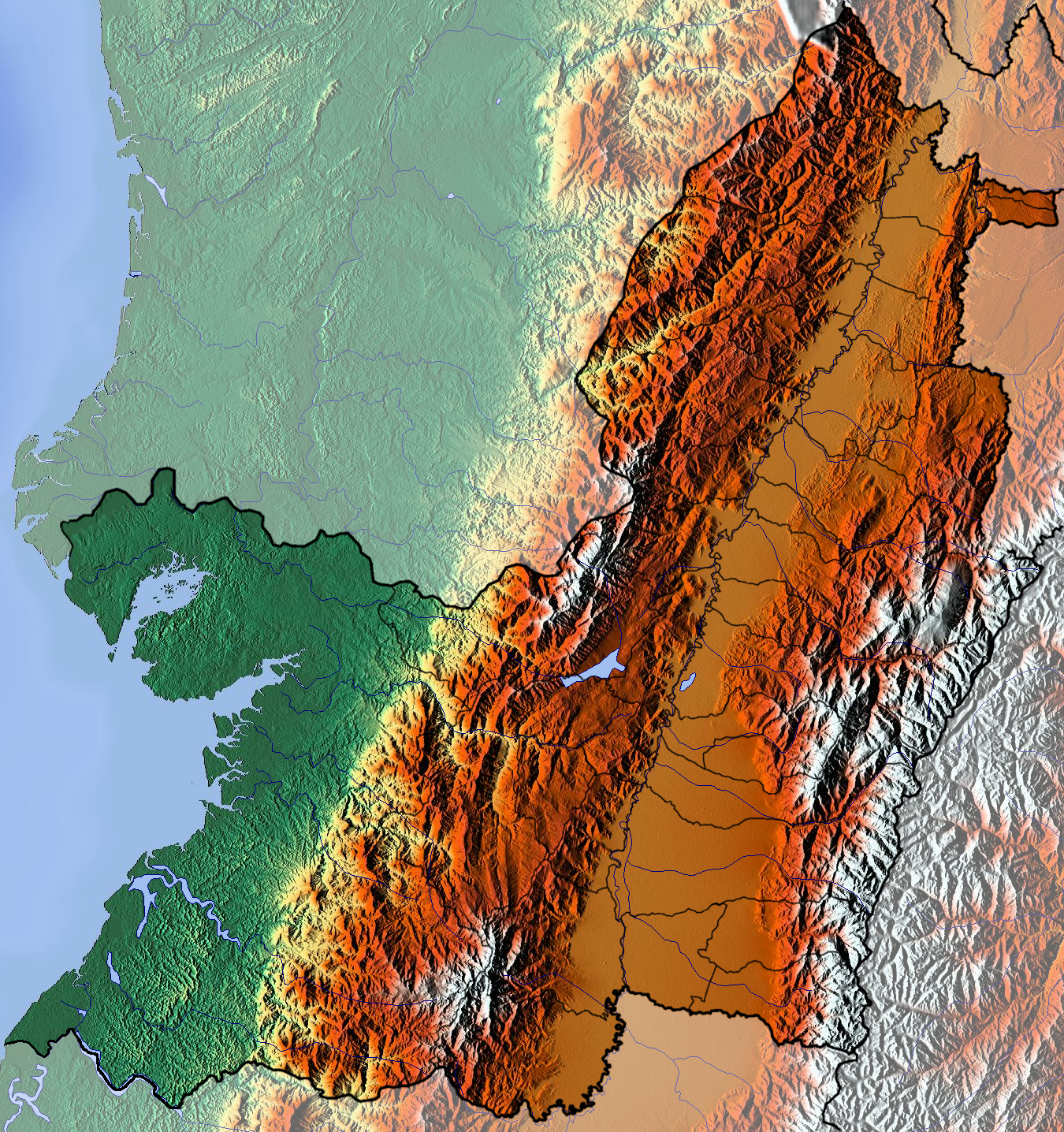
- Topography of the department
- Coordinates: 3°25′N 76°31′W
- Country: Colombia
- Region: Andean Region/Pacific Region
- Established: 16 April 1910
- Capital: Cali

Government
  - Governor: Dilian Francisca Toro (2024–2027) (Social Party of National Unity)

Area
  - Total: 22,140 km^{2} (8,550 sq mi)
  - Rank: 23rd

Population (2018)
  - Total: 4,475,886
  - Rank: 3rd
  - Density: 202.2/km^{2} (523.6/sq mi)
- Demonym(s): vallecaucano, valluno

GDP
  - Total: COP 139,863 billion (US$ 32.9 billion)
- Time zone: UTC−5
- ISO 3166 code: CO-VAC
- Municipalities: 42
- HDI: 0.812 very high · 2nd of 33
- Website: www.valledelcauca.gov.co

Valle del Cauca (Spanish for "Cauca Valley"; Spanish pronunciation: [ˈbaʎe ðel ˈkawka]) is a department in western Colombia abutting the Pacific Ocean. Its capital is Santiago de Cali. Other cities such as Buenaventura, Buga, Cartago, Palmira and Tuluá have great economical, political, social and cultural influence on the department's life. Valle del Cauca has the largest number of independent (i.e., nonmetropolitan) towns with over 100,000 inhabitants of any department in the country, counting six within its borders. Buenaventura has the largest and busiest seaport in Colombia, moving about 8,500,000 tons of merchandise annually.

== Geography ==
The department of Valle del Cauca is located in the western part of the country, between 3° 5′ N and 5° 1′ N latitude and 75° 42′ W and 77° 33′ W longitude. It borders the departments of Risaralda and Quindío to the north, Cauca to the south, Tolima to the east, and Chocó and the Pacific Ocean to the west. The valley is geographically bounded by the Cordillera Central and Occidental and is watered by numerous rivers that empty into the Cauca River. The department is divided into four zones: the Pacific Fringe, which is humid and mostly jungle; the western mountain range, also humid and full of jungle, heavily deforested because of the paper industry; the Andean valley of the Cauca River, whose surrounding lands are the most fertile in the country; and the western ridge of the Cordillera Central. Valle del Cauca also administers Malpelo Island in the Pacific.

== History ==
=== Prehistory ===
==== Hunter-gatherer societies ====
Palynological analyses performed by experts have determined that during the Superior Pleistocene some 40,000–10,500 years ago, the valleys of El Dorado and Alto Calima had Andean forests and sub-Andean vegetation. The discovery of projectiles indicated that there were communities of hunter-gatherers at the end of the Pleistocene and the beginning of the Holocene. The extinction of the Pleistocenic megafauna in the beginning of the Holocene forced humans to adapt to their new environment, becoming hunter-gatherers. In the lower basin of the Calima River (Sauzalito River, El Recreo River, and El Pital River), archaeologists found the oldest traces of hunter-gatherers who inhabited the Valley of the Cauca River. According to these, in 5000 BC these societies already had some level of primitive agriculture and cultivated maize. There is little information about the years between 3000 and 1500 BC.

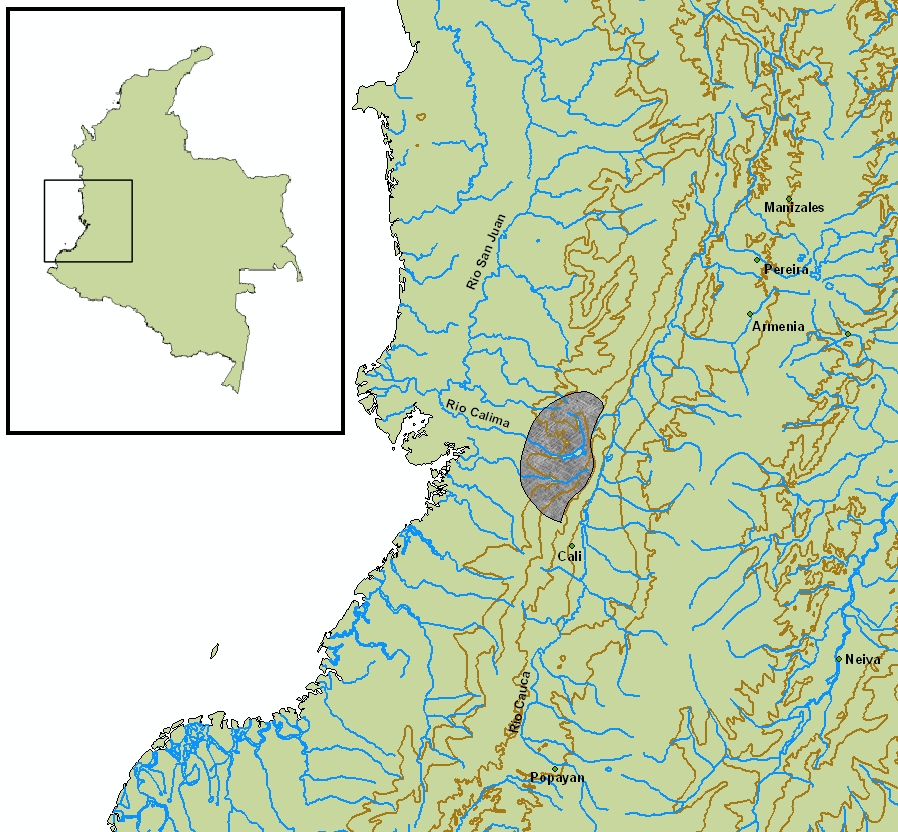
Ilama culture location (c. 1500–1 BC)

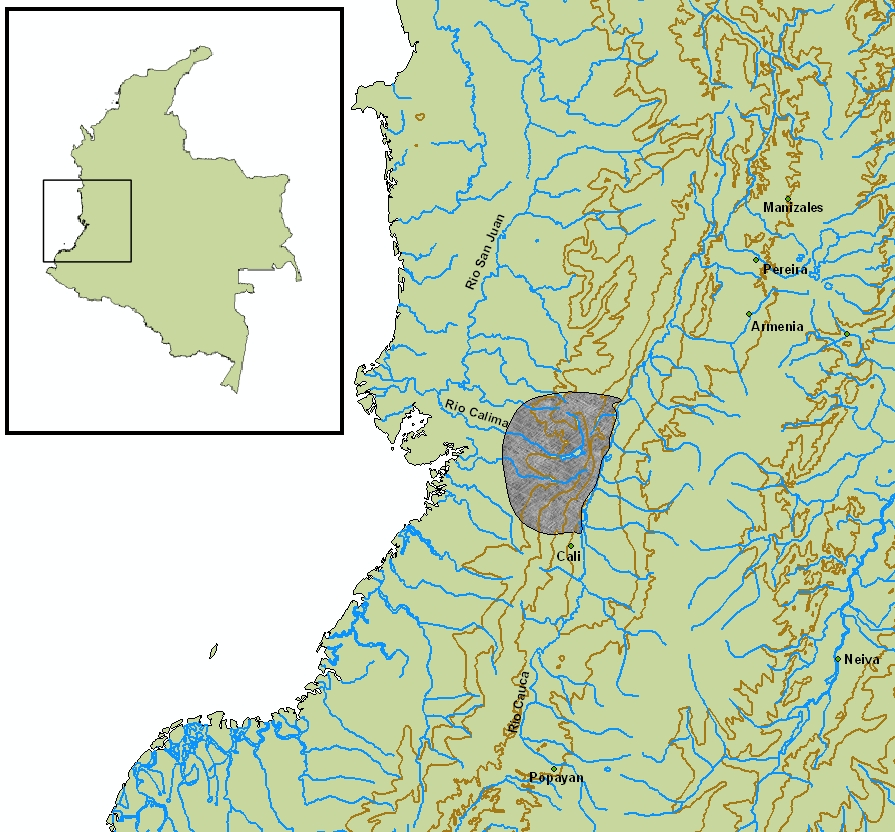
Location of the Yotoco culture (c. 1–1200 AD)

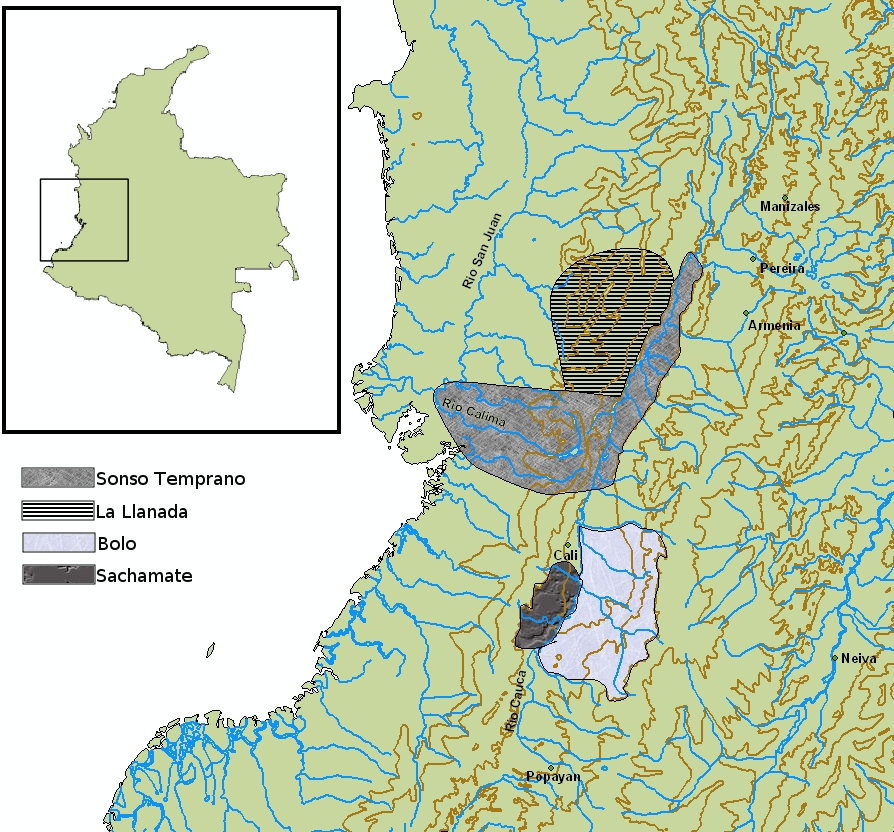
Late Period I cultures (c. 600–1300)

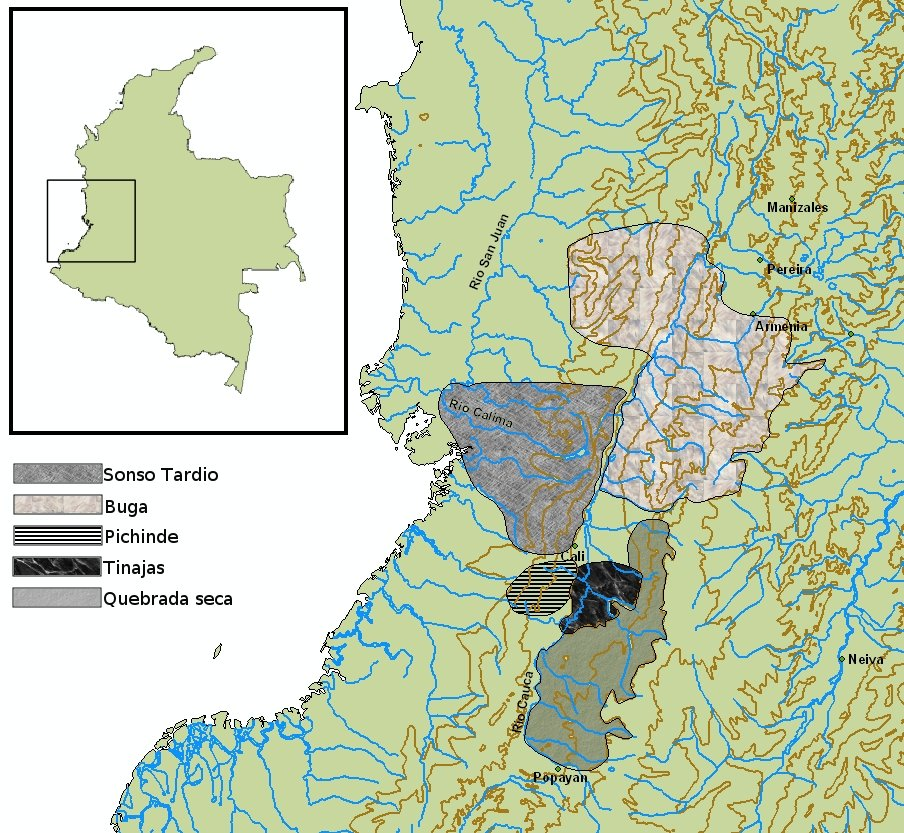
Late Period II cultures (c. 1400–1600)

==== Ancient agricultural–pottery societies (1500 BC – 600 AD) ====
In 1500 BC the first agricultural–pottery society, the Ilama culture, appeared, extending along the Calima River (in what is now the towns of Restrepo and Darién). Its society had a social structure of cacicazgos ("chiefdoms") that prevailed until the arrival of the Spaniards. The Ilama economy was based on migratory agriculture using maize, yuca, and beans; hunting; fishing; textile manufacturing; and metallurgy. The chief or cacique was the head of the settlement and had chamanes ("spiritual leaders"), warriors, farmers, hunters, pottery men, and goldsmiths. By 100 AD, the Ilama had developed into the Yotoco, whom expanded the region of the Ilama further, down the Cauca River to the Pacific Ocean, and southward to the present-day region of Santiago de Cali (Cali).

The Yotoco were a highly stratified society, headed by caciques, who managed several settlements. They existed in the region until around 1200 AD. A rising population forced them to develop effective agricultural systems to meet food demand, which improved pottery and metalworking techniques. Yotoco agriculture — based on maize, yuca, beans, arracacha, and achiote, among other foods - was more diverse than that of the Ilama. The Yotoco experienced a decline beginning in the 6th century AD.

==== Pre-Columbian agricultural–pottery societies (600–1600) ====
This archeological period is called the Late Period and is divided into Late Period I (6th to 13th centuries) and Late Period II (14th to 16th centuries). In Late Period I the Valle del Cauca region was inhabited by the early Sonso culture, Bolo, Sachamate, and La Llanada. During Late Period II the region was inhabited by the late Sonso culture, Pichinde, Buga, and Quebrada Seca. Their development is attributed to population growth. Almost all the settlers in the area became subject to the rule of one main cacique.

=== Arrival of the Spanish and conquest ===
The first 67 Spanish explorers arrived in the area after founding the village of Popayán, in an expedition from Quito headed by Sebastián de Belalcázar. In the Valle del Cauca the explorers founded the village of Villa de Ampudia, named after one of them, Juan de Ampudia. By orders of Belalcázar the village was then moved to the Riviera of the Cauca River, within the Gorrones indigenous people's territory. In 1536, a Captain Muñoz ordered the city to be moved to the Valley, where the Village of Cali was founded on 25 July of that same year. Another Spanish explorer, Juan de Vadillo, coming from the village of Cartagena de Indias, entered Cali on 23 December 1538 with a second group of explorers, but he returned to Cartagena, leaving many of his men behind including Pedro Cieza de León. A third group of explorers, led by Admiral Jorge Robledo under orders of Lorenzo de Aldana, advanced to the North of the Valle del Cauca and founded the villages of Anserma (now part of Caldas Department; 15 August 1539), Cartago (9 August 1540), and Antioquia (25 November 1541), and under command of Pascual de Andagoya who came from Panama to Cali with a fourth group of explorers.

=== Department of Valle del Cauca ===
The Department of Valle del Cauca was created by decree number 340 on April 16, 1910, which created 12 other departments in Colombia. The Valle del Cauca Department was a result of the union of four former departments: Cartago, Buga, and Cali.

== Government ==
The government of Valle del Cauca is similar to the central government of Colombia, which has three branches of power: executive, legislative, and judicial, along with various control agencies with oversight capacity. The executive branch in Valle del Cauca is represented by the governor, the legislative branch is represented by the department assembly and its deputies, and the judicial branch is represented by four department-wide court systems: the Superior Tribunal of Cali, the Penal Court of the Circuit of Cali, the Administrative Tribunal of Valle del Cauca, and the Superior Military Tribunal for military cases. Valle del Cauca has 42 municipalities, each with a mayor, who is a popularly elected representative of the governor.

=== Administrative divisions ===
==== Municipalities ====
- Alcalá
- Andalucía
- Ansermanuevo
- Argelia
- Bolívar
- Buenaventura
- Buga
- Bugalagrande
- Caicedonia
- Cali
- Calima
- Candelaria
- Cartago
- Dagua
- El Águila
- El Cairo
- El Cerrito
- El Dovio
- Florida
- Ginebra
- Guacarí
- Jamundí
- La Cumbre
- La Unión
- La Victoria
- Obando
- Palmira
- Pradera
- Restrepo
- Riofrío
- Roldanillo
- San Pedro
- Sevilla
- Toro
- Trujillo
- Tuluá
- Ulloa
- Versalles
- Vijes
- Yotoco
- Yumbo
- Zarzal

=== Department's agencies and institutions ===
- Universidad del Valle (University – Multiple Campuses): Univalle is one of the largest and most respected universities in Colombia. It is entirely funded by the government.
- Hospital Universitario (University Health Centre): The University Health Centre of Valle located in the heart of Cali is designated as a level 4 hospital, the highest level in the national ranking system. Its E.R and traumatology centres are ranked among the country's busiest and most well trained.
- Acuavalle (Department's water management and rural water supply Agency)
- Bellas Artes (Fine Arts School): Until the 80's it was Colombia's most admired Arts School. Due to funding reductions and other problems, its influence gradually disappeared.
- Beneficiencia del Valle (Department's Lottery): Currently, the biggest prize awarded is $1,200,000,000 COP (about US$500,000). In the Colombian system, regional lottery agencies run their own programs and prizes. Departments' budgets are largely funded by lottery agencies transfers.
- Infivalle (Department's financial agency)
- Indervalle (Department's sports Institution)
- Industria de Licores (Department's Liquor Company): Aguardiente Blanco del Valle is the main product made by the company.
- Telepacifico (Regional TV channel)
- Incolballet (School of Ballet of Colombia)
- Bibliovalle (Libraries Network): The department runs a network of libraries in municipalities with no resources to run their own. The Central Department's library is located in Cali into the Rodrigo Lloreda Caicedo Science Center.

== Economy ==
Valle del Cauca has a diversified economy. Its valley contains sugarcane, cotton, soy, and sorghum crops, and there are coffee crops in the mountains. The department is known for its sugar industry, which provides sugar to the markets of the rest of the country and nearby countries. The sugar is obtained from the large sugar cane plantations, which were introduced to the department by Sebastián de Belalcázar. The production by the city of Yumbo also stands out, where several companies are found, most prominently the paper and cement businesses. The port at Buenaventura is Colombia's main port on the Pacific coast, allowing for the import and export of goods, and is of great importance for the economy of both the department and the country.

== Demographics ==
Historical population
Year	Pop.	±%
1973	2,186,801	—
1985	3,027,247	+38.4%
1993	3,736,090	+23.4%
2005	4,161,425	+11.4%
2018	4,475,886	+7.6%

More than 80% of the population lives in cities or towns. The coverage of public services is among the highest in the country, with electrical power and education standing out the most.

=== Population ===
The capital of the department is Santiago de Cali, with approximately 2,800,000 inhabitants. It is made up of 42 municipalities, the most populous being, from north to south, Cartago (famous for its craftsmanship, embroidery, and the Casa del Virrey, "House of the Viceroy"), Roldanillo (location of the museum containing works by the artist Omar Rayo), Tuluá (located in the center of the department), Yumbo (an industrial center with more than 2,000 industries), Ginebra, Palmira, Buga, and Jamundí.

The population of nonmetropolitan towns with over 100,000 inhabitants is as follows (capital in italics):

Town	Female	Male	Total
Cali	1,270,850	1,129,713	2,400,563
Buenaventura	167,972	156,235	324,207
Buga	57,635	53,852	111,847
Cartago	64,209	57,532	121,741
Palmira	144,582	133,776	278,258
Tulua	95,922	87,314	183,236

== Culture ==
=== Architecture ===
The Cauca Valley was historically a place dedicated to cattle and agricultural activities. For this reason, the region has not developed an artistic and European-influenced architectural style, as the relative near city of Popayán, located in the department of Cauca; instead, the department generates simple and pragmatic constructions, with a few exceptions. The material of the colonial constructions was basically of wood and bricks, with some use of stones.

=== Cuisine ===
The food most closely associated with the department is sancocho de gallina, a stew made with an old hen, potatoes, yucca, corn, and other ingredients; the characteristic flavor comes from a herb called cimarrón or recao (Eryngium foetidum).

== See also ==
- Norte del Valle Cartel — Colombian cartel
