= University City of Bogotá =

Flagship campus and headquarters of the National University of Colombia

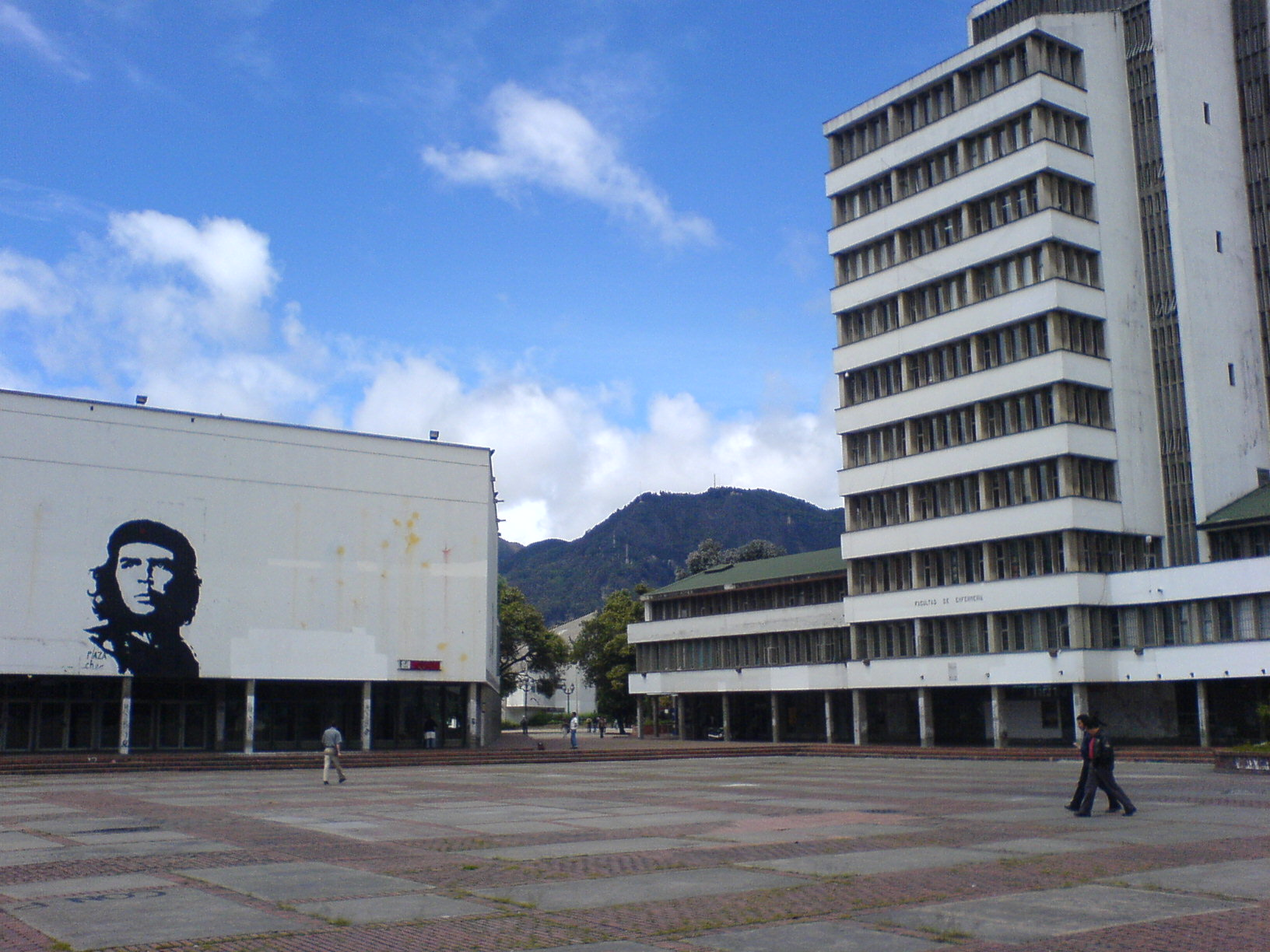
- León de Greiff Auditorium
- Established: 1937
- Parent institution: National University of Colombia
- Location: Bogotá; 4.637767°N 74.083987°W
- Architect: Leopold Rother
- Website: bogota.unal.edu.co

The University City of Bogotá (Spanish: Ciudad Universitaria de Bogotá, CUB), also known as the White City (Spanish: Ciudad Blanca), is the flagship campus of the National University of Colombia, located near Teusaquillo, in Bogotá, Colombia. It is the largest university campus in Colombia, with an overall area of 1,200,000 m^{2} (300 acres) and a constructed area of 308,541 m^{2} (76.242 acres), giving it ample green areas, open spaces, and pedestrian paths. Amongst its buildings are seventeen that have been declared national monuments; these constitute a cross section of the last 60 years of Colombian architecture.

The University City Rafael Uribe began when Alfonso López Pumarejo, in his first term of office as president of the country, envisioned the National University of Colombia as a modern, evolutionary, and experimental infrastructure including a balance of science and arts. The University City in Bogotá of National University of Colombia may be viewed as an example of the architectonic expression of the modernization of the State from 1930 to the present time.

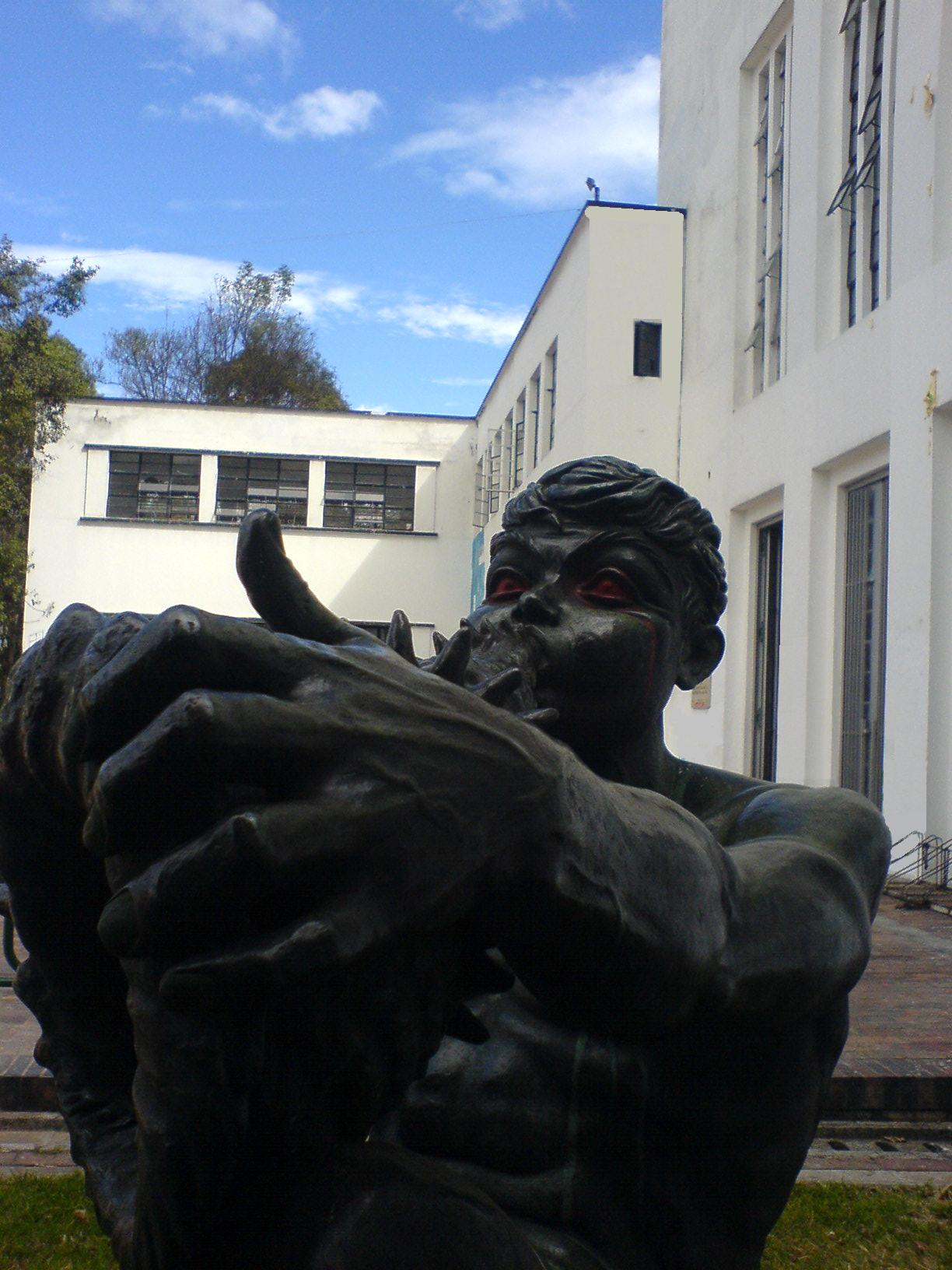
School of Beaux Arts, University City, Bogotá

By virtue of law 68, enacted in 1935, it was made the National University of Colombia, an independent organization which opened education to a wider cross section of the population. This new broader view of education, the educational and administrative structure of the University City of Bogotá, its place in the state and its architecture had to reflect, in their respective scopes, the spirit of modernization on which the country was based. The state granted lands to the future university which were west of the city at the time, intending to stimulate the urban development of that zone. This plan succeeded to the point that, in 2006, the National University in its campus of Bogotá is considered both central and easily accessible.

To design the university, which had until then distributed academic functions across scattered locations throughout Bogotá and to different governmental organizations, the national government invited architect Fritz Karsen, expert in university subjects, and the architect Leopold Rother to come assist them. Karsen defined and integrated an academic structure in an ellipse form from which radiated the five great academic divisions and his respective dependencies. The scheme was translated by Rother into the proposed space distribution for the in a "puristic cubism" style, but with some characteristics of the seat of the famous school of Bauhaus, in Dessau (Germany), with a prismatic volumetry, white and austere.

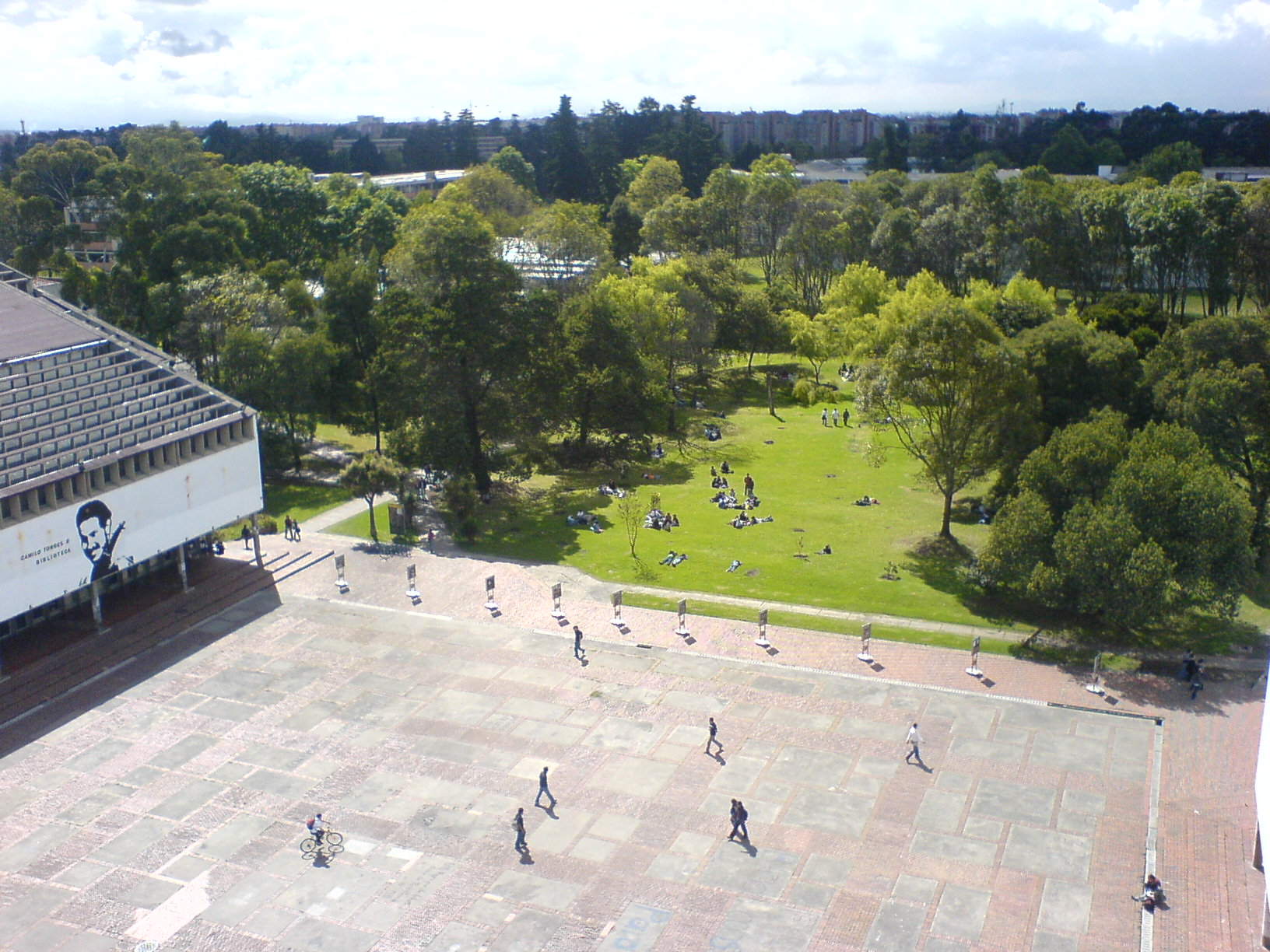
Central Square, University City, Bogotá

The space distribution offered the concept of "campus" for the first time in Colombia, where all the required buildings are scattered through green zones for relaxation, integrated with one another and connected by footpaths through the campus and two roads around the perimeter. Architects the Office of National Buildings of the Public Work Ministry, the Colombian organization in charge of the design and construction of the national administrative buildings, assisted Karsen and Rother in designing the campus.

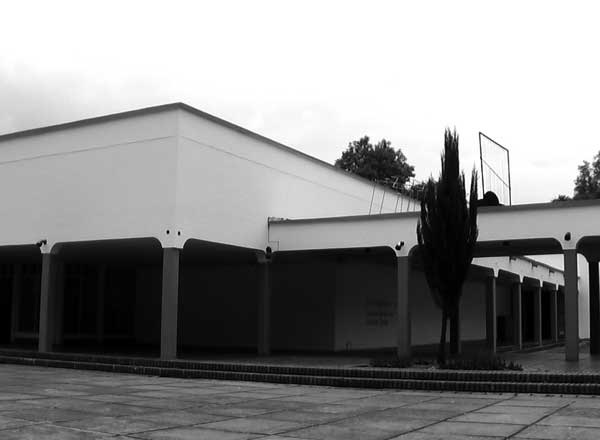
Art Museum, University City, Bogotá

The composition of plants and facades with tendency to the asymmetry, the handling of new materials and new constructive techniques are, in synthesis, the elements that served as foundation the design. The constructions of the University City followed, in general terms, although the symmetrical composition in the space distribution of some buildings and the use of traditional constructive systems in others is well known. The use of stucco and white paint earned the campus the name of "White City".

The work of architect Leopold Rother is remarkable in that, in addition to participating in the initial planning stages of the campus, designed several specific buildings: the stage Alfonso Lopez (1937), the administrative offices (1937), porters' lodges at the entrances of streets 26 and 45 (1937), faculty housing (1939), research laboratories (1940), the engineering building, in conjunction with Bruno Violi (1940), and the press (1945). Rother stayed in the country as a teacher and influenced several generations of architects formed in the newly created Faculty of Architecture of the University. Of the initial buildings, the set of veterinary medicine and the faculty of architecture, both designed by Erik Lange and Ernesto Blumenthal (1938), the faculty of Alberto Wills Ferro (1940) and the student residences of Julio Bonilla are due to Silver's emphasis (1939 and 1940) and have been declared National Monuments.

The University City, in its design and construction, has furthered acceptance of modern architectonic language and its condition of paradigm and is considered one of the ten most important works of the century, in Colombia.
