= Claudia Patricia Vaca González =

Colombian pharmaceutical chemist

Claudia Patricia Vaca González is a Colombian pharmaceutical chemist and associate professor at the National University of Colombia (Universidad Nacional de Colombia). She specializes in pharmacoepidemiology and has contributed to the field through her research and academic work. She has provided commentary on issues of public health. She led the conference: "Management of medicines from a State Social Enterprise in 2024."

== Career ==
Vaca González has been involved in academia, serving as a professor in the Department of Pharmacy at National University of Colombia. Her areas of expertise include pharmacoepidemiology, pharmaceutical policy, and public health. Between July 2010 and January 2015, Vaca González served as an adviser to the Office of the Minister of Health in Colombia, contributing to the development of policies on medicines and biotherapeutics. She is the founder and director of the Center for Thought on Medicines, Information, and Power at the National University of Colombia.
