= Sonny Jiménez de Tejada =

First Colombian woman to earn an engineering degree in Colombia

- Born: Sonny Jiménez Arbeláez; 6 January 1922; Medellín, Colombia
- Died: 5 May 2014 (aged 92); Medellín, Colombia
- Occupation: Engineer

Sonny Jiménez de Tejada (6 January 1922 – 5 May 2014) was the first Colombian woman to earn an engineering degree in Colombia. Additionally, she held various political positions, such as Deputy of the Departmental Assembly of Antioquia in 1968, Secretary of Administrative Services of the Medellín municipal office in 1975 and executive director of the Prodevelopment Corporation of the Faculty of Mines.

== Biography ==
Sonny Jiménez de Tejada was born Sonny Jiménez Arbeláez on 6 January 1922 in Medellín, Colombia, to Luis Emilio Jiménez and Débora Arbeláez. In 1941, she entered the Faculty of Mines of the National University of Colombia, where she graduated as a civil and mining engineer in 1946 as the first woman to do so. Later, she completed a Master of Science in Civil Engineering, at the Carnegie Institute of Technology in 1948. She went on to complete a masters in Urban Physical Planning at the National University of Colombia in Medellín in 1976. She worked with the Women's Professional Association encouraging women to study engineering.

Tejada was celebrated for her work and contribution to women's access to higher education in Colombia.

== Personal life ==
Tejada married fellow engineer José Tejada Sáenz. They had five children, one of whom is a professor of mathematics Débora Tejada. He died in 2011.Tejada died on May 5, 2014, in Medellín.
