= Diana Pombo =

Colombian environmentalist, architect, and writer

Diana Carolina Pombo
- Born: 10 January 1952; Bogotá, Colombia
- Died: 12 November 2016; Colombia
- Education: National University of Colombia
- Occupation(s): Environmentalist, architect, writer

Diana Carolina Pombo Holguín (10 January 1952 – 12 November 2016) was a Colombian environmentalist, architect and writer. Pombo was born in Bogotá, where she studied architecture at the National University of Colombia, further specializing in environmental topics in universities of France, Germany and Brazil. She contributed to the construction of current environmental policies, and the creation of the National Environmental Movement.

Pombo was an advisor on several occasions to entities such as Colciencias, the Ministry of the Environment, the Alexander von Humboldt Biological Resources Research Institute, together with the Regional Autonomous Corporations. She was also from the United Nations organization in addition to a long journey through non-governmental organizations.

She was an advisor to the Minister of the Environment Manuel Rodríguez Becerra, presented the design of the first National Biodiversity Strategy and the First International Cooperation Program for the Environment. She made valuable contributions in the creation of the Water, Forests and Biodiversity policy. Pombo was the founder of the Institute of Environmental Management (IGEA), as well as her work on the Cartagena Protocol on biosafety and transgenics, the protection of traditional knowledge of indigenous, farming and Afro-Colombian communities, in addition to coordinating the team Latin America for the international negotiation of issues of access to genetic resources of the Andean countries. Among her publications is ‘Tropics’, an old woman about culture, the idiosyncrasies of the people, but also about the places they inhabit, their animals, their plants and objects. She died in Bogotá on 12 November 2016 due to uterine cancer.
