= Omar-Darío Cardona Arboleda =

Columbian author & academic

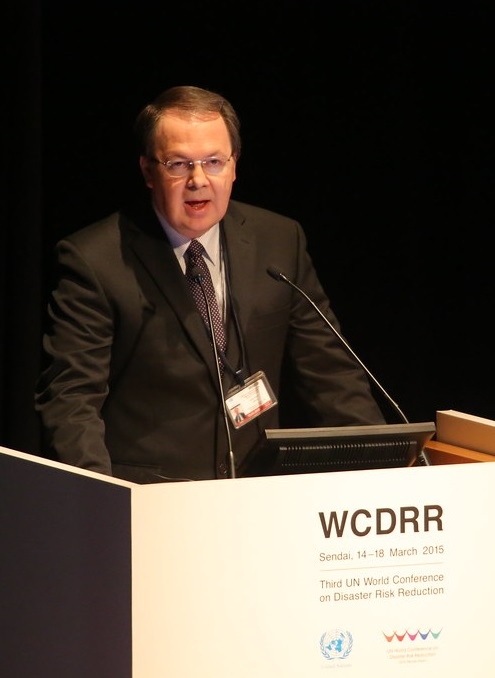
- Born: July 28, 1958 (age 68); Manizales, Colombia
- Occupations: Civil engineer, academic, and author
- Spouse: Ketty Carla Mendes Arraiol
- Awards: United Nations Sasakawa Prize for Disaster Risk Reduction

Academic background
- Education: B.Sc., and Ph.D
- Alma mater: National University of Colombia; Institute of Earthquake Engineering and Engineering Seismology; Technical University of Catalonia

Academic work
- Institutions: National University of Colombia; Technical University of Catalonia; University of Los Andes (Colombia)

Omar-Darío Cardona Arboleda is a civil engineer, academic, and author. He is a Titular Professor of integrated disaster risk management and climate change adaptation in the Institute of Environment Studies at the National University of Colombia, Co-founder, and CEO of Ingeniar: Risk Intelligence.

He has authored many books including, Indicators of Disaster Risk and Risk Management, Seismic Risk and its Prevention, Financial Disaster Risk Management, Holistic Estimation of Seismic Risk Using Complex Dynamic Systems, A Guide to Measuring Urban Resilience, and Seismic Vulnerability of Hospitals. His research work focuses on earthquake engineering, disaster risk management, climate change adaptation, civil engineering, and urban planning. He has received recognition for his work on vulnerability assessment, probabilistic risk modeling, and disaster risk reduction on a global scale.

Cardona is a Fellow of the American Concrete Institute. He is a founder member of the Latin American Network of Social Studies on Disaster Prevention (LA RED), and has been a member of scientific committees of IPCC for SREX, and AR5, Integrated Research on Disaster Risk (IRDR), and Global Earthquake Model (GEM) Science Board.

== Education ==
Cardona received a bachelor's degree in Civil Engineering from the National University of Colombia in 1980. Subsequently, he specialized in Earthquake Engineering from Institute of Earthquake Engineering and Engineering Seismology, Disaster Prevention from Oxford Polytechnic, and Risk Mitigation from the Colorado State University between 1985 and 1991. In 2000, he completed his Ph.D. in Earthquake Engineering and Structural Dynamics at the Technical University of Catalonia.

== Career ==
Cardona started his academic career as a System Programmer in 1981 at the Prodatos S.A. Manizales Electronic Data Processing Center. He concurrently served as an Assistant Professor of Earthquake Resistant Design, Reinforced Concrete and Prestressing, Structural Analysis at the National University of Colombia in 1981. Followed by this appointment, he served as a Professor of Vulnerability and Seismic risk from 1990 to 2003 in the Department of Civil & Environmental Engineering at the University of Los Andes. Between 2011 and 2018, he served as Academic Advisor in the Institute for Environment and Human Security at the United Nations University, and International Center of Excellence in Vulnerability and Resilience Metrics at the University of South Carolina. As of 2005, he has been a Professor of Integrated Disaster Risk Management and Climate Change Adaptation at the Institute of Environment Studies at the National University of Colombia in Manizales.

Cardona has held administrative appointments throughout his career. He held an appointment as Academic Director for the Center of Studies on Disasters and Risks from 1997 to 2003, and concurrently held an appointment as Academic Director of Specialization in Risk Assessment and Disaster Prevention at the University of Los Andes from 1997 till 2001.

Between 1988 and 1995, Cardona was an advisor of Presidency of the Republic and the Director-General of the National Directorate for Disaster Risk Management of Colombia. He has also served as the president of the Colombian Association for Earthquake Engineering from 1990 to 2003. He promoted at that time the new legislation to update the country’s national earthquake-resistant construction requirements, including a new seismic hazard assessment and approaches for structural vulnerability assessment and seismic retrofitting, as well as special design standards for hospitals and other essential buildings. He is the co-founder and CEO of Ingeniar: Risk Intelligence.

== Research ==
Cardona has authored over 290 publications. His research focus includes probabilistic risk modeling, climate change adaptation, seismic hazard, earthquake engineering, and multi-hazard risk assessment.

=== Vulnerability and disaster risk management ===
In one of his inputs as a lead researcher, Cardona examined the determinants of risk including, exposure and vulnerability. This assessment report highlighted that variations in risk and the impacts that occur when that risk is realized are largely driven by trends in vulnerability and exposure. Before formulating and putting the effective adaptation and disaster risk management strategies into action, it is essential to comprehend the multifaceted nature of vulnerability and exposure to identify how the weather and climatic events contribute to the occurrence of environmental catastrophe. The study also disclosed that vulnerability and exposure are dynamic, and dependent on many factors including, economic, social, institutional, geographic, and environmental.

In another study, he characterized vulnerability as an essential factor in understanding disaster risk management, and addressed its significance for the effective policy making process. He designed and proposed four indicators that identify country's progress in managing the risk: Disaster Deficit Index, Local Disaster Index, Prevalent Vulnerability Index, Risk Management Index. This system of indicators aims at reducing vulnerability and losses, recovering from disasters, prepare for catastrophes and disasters. Early on in 2004, he indicated a need for rethinking the concepts of vulnerability and risk from a holistic perspective in a research review study. He regarded the absence of a comprehensive and multidisciplinary evaluation of risk to be a significant factor in the decline of risk management effectiveness. He concluded that a holistic approach of risk can assess the dynamics of social system, and advance the risk management by incorporating effective measures that will lead to adequate reduction of risk by authorities and communities. Another study showed that MOVE (Methods for the Improvement of Vulnerability Assessment in Europe) can be used as a starting point for creating and differentiating vulnerability assessment indicators and criteria. As an integrative and holistic framework, it deals with various aspects that should be tended to while evaluating vulnerability with regards to natural hazards and climate change. The study also revealed a need for a multiple thematic approach for vulnerability assessment and examined key linkages between the disaster risk management (DRM) and climate change adaptation (CCA) research.

=== Multi-hazard risk assessment ===
Cardona has extensively researched on probabilistic and holistic risk evaluation. In 2006, he proposed that a multidisciplinary approach is a pre-requisite for risk evaluation as it takes social fragility and lack of resilience in account in addition to economic losses. This evaluation approach combines a hard approach i.e., type of casualties and physical loss as well as a soft approach such as, social condition context including the capacity to absorb the effects, lack of preparedness, and political instability. It revealed that potential negative consequences of disaster are linked with the physical as well as social conditions and the latter can aggravate the impacts of former. The study also applied the proposed holistic approach for seismic risk evaluation to the cities of Bogota and Barcelona. He determined total risk level by the evaluation of seismic risk from a holistic perspective, and regarded it as useful in the decision-making process for risk reduction. Having discussed that, he examined the seismic vulnerability and risk analysis methods with regards to Spain that indicates a considerably high degree of vulnerability to earthquakes. He explored the seismic risk evaluation using the holistic approach, and presented the evidence of robustness of the said approach by considering physical exposure, social fragilities, as well as lack of resilience of urban area. In addition to that, he also conducted a research study in order to estimate the probabilistic seismic losses and the public economic resilience from a macroeconomic impact lens. The Disaster Deficit Index (DDI) was employed, and it suggested a simple way to measure the potential losses regarding the fiscal exposure of a country to assess them as contingent liabilities.

Cardona has also contributed to the first time fully probabilistic multi-hazard assessment at global level for the UNDRR’s Global Assessment Report on Disaster Risk Reduction 2013, 2015, and 2017. The classification of globe was conducted with respect to set of seismogenetic areas, and Gutenberg–Richter magnitude–frequency distribution was assumed for the regions. This study results in the computation of probabilistic seismic hazard and the coarse-grain probabilistic risk computations were also performed. The Global Assessment Report presented risk maps and rankings at global level along with the calculated average annual loss in all countries with respect also to tsunami, tropical cyclone wind, storm surge and flood risk assessment.

The robustness of the holistic seismic risk evaluation in urban centers was examined using the Urban Seismic Risk index (USRi). The research study was conducted in order to validate the robustness of the given indicator, and characterize the evaluation of disaster risk in different megacities of the world was presented as well. The fully probabilistic seismic risk assessment was also conducted for several cities using a comprehensive approach dependent on building-by-building and aerial images database. The vulnerability functions were assigned to the buildings, and risk evaluation were presented in a diverse set of metrics. These studies hold great significance for the stakeholders to identify risk, and factors of vulnerability that can be targeted to reduced or intervened. An approach was developed for the quantification of climate-related disaster risk and its use within decision making processes to support adaptation, based on extended catastrophe modeling theory to incorporate deep uncertainty through imprecise, non-stationary, probability metrics. The model was applied in Colombia covering floods, droughts, tropical cyclones, landslides, and wildfires. An exposure model was constructed covering country-wide portfolios of buildings with multiple uses, infrastructure, crops and ecosystems, accounting for a multisector approach. All this work has been based on the development, improvement, and use of the Comprehensive Approach to Probabilistic Risk Assessment (CAPRA); an open-source multi-hazard risk modeling platform. The main natural, governance, and public policy lab used by Cardona has been the city of Manizales in Colombia, where the conceptual frameworks, scientific and technical tools, and disaster risk management decision-making have been implemented in practice.

== Awards and honors ==
- 2004 – United Nations Sasakawa Prize for Disaster Reduction, United Nations Office for Disaster Risk Reduction
- 2005 - Medal Alfonso Carvajal Escobar of the Caldas Society of Engineers and Architects
- 2009 - Order of Merit Julio Garavito Armero in grade Cruz de Comendador, from Colombian Society of Engineers and the National Government

== Bibliography ==
=== Books ===
- Seismic Vulnerability of Hospitals: Fundamentals for Engineers and Architects (1999) ISBN 978-84-89925-33-5
- Seismic Risk and Its Prevention (2000) ISBN 978-84-930662-1-5
- Holistic Estimation of Seismic Risk Using Complex Dynamic Systems (2001)
- Methodology for Evaluating Risk Management Performance (2004) ISBN 9788495999668
- “Ex post" Assessment of the State of Damage to Buildings Affected by an Earthquake (2005) ISBN 978-84-95999-76-4
- Ancient Buildings and Earthquakes: Reducing the Vulnerability of Historical Built-up Environment by Recovering the Local Seismic Culture: Principles, Methods, Potentialities (2005) ISBN 978-88-7228-403-2
- Indicators of Disaster Risk and Risk Management (2007) ISBN 978-958-44-0219-6
- Financial Disaster Risk Management (2009) ISBN 978-9972-787-79-9
- A Guide to Measuring Urban Resilience: Principles, Tools and Practice of Urban Indicators (2015)
- World at Risk: Revealing latent disasters (2017): GAR Atlas Unveiling Global Disaster Risk

=== Selected articles ===
- Cardona, O. D. (2004). The need for rethinking the concepts of vulnerability and risk from a holistic perspective: a necessary review and criticism for effective risk management. In Mapping vulnerability: Disasters, Development and People, G. Bankoff, G.Frerks, D. Hilhorst (Ed), (pp. 37–51), Routledge.
- Cardona, O.D. (2011). Disaster Risk and Vulnerability: Notions and Measurement of Human and Environmental Insecurity. In: Coping with Glo bal Environmental Change, Disasters and Security-Threats, Challenges, Vulnerabilities and Risks, H.G. Brauch, U. Oswald Spring, C. Mesjasz, … & J. Birkmann (Eds), 107-121, Springer-Verlag.
- Cardona, O. D., Van Aalst, M. K., Birkmann, J., Fordham, M., Mc Gregor, G., Rosa, P., ... & Thomalla, F. (2012). Determinants of risk: exposure and vulnerability. In Managing the risks of extreme events and disasters to advance climate change adaptation: special report of the intergovernmental panel on climate change (pp. 65–108). Cambridge University Press.
- Cardona, O. D., & Carreño, M. L. (2013). System of indicators of disaster risk and risk management for the Americas: Recent updating and application of the IDB-IDEA approach. In: Measuring vulnerability to natural hazards: Toward disaster resilient societies, 2nd edn., ed. J. Birkmann, 251276.
- Birkmann, J., Cardona, O. D., Carreño, M. L., Barbat, A. H., Pelling, M., Schneiderbauer, S., ... & Welle, T. (2013). Framing vulnerability, risk and societal responses: the MOVE framework. Natural hazards, 67(2), 193-211.
- Cardona, O.D. (2016). Analfabetismo científico e incertidumbre: Implicaciones para una conciencia planetaria. En: Ciencia y Humanismo, Revista Aleph 50 años, Ruiz, C.E. (Ed.), pp 153–186. Universidad de Caldas.
- Bernal, G.A, Cardona, O.D., Marulanda, M.C., Carreño, M.L. (2021). Dealing with Uncertainty Using Fully Probabilistic Risk Assessment for Decision-Making. In: S. Eslamian, F. Eslamian (eds.), 299-340, Handbook of Disaster Risk Reduction for Resilience, Springer Nature.
- Cardona, O.D. (2022). Medir la verosimilitud del futuro: Predicciones para transformar el presente, en ALEPH Convergencia de saberes, Revista Aleph 200, Ruiz, C.E. (Ed.), pp 251–270. Ediciones Revista Aleph.
