= National University of Colombia =

Public research university in Colombia

- Universidad Nacional de Colombia
- Motto: Inter-Aulas-Academiæ-Quære-Verum
- Motto in English: Search the truth in the rooms of the academy
- Type: Public, National
- Established: 22 September 1867 (158 years ago)
- Rector: Leopoldo Múnera Ruiz
- Academic staff: 3,114 (2019)
- Administrative staff: 2,932 (2019)
- Students: 53,304 (2019)
- Undergraduates: 44,621
- Postgraduates: 8,683
- Doctoral students: 1,278
- Location: Bogotá, Cundinamarca, Colombia; 4°38′8″N 74°4′58″W
- Campus: 300 acres (1,214,056.9 m^{2}); Urban
- Colours: Green and Red
- Website: unal.edu.co

The National University of Colombia (Spanish: Universidad Nacional de Colombia) is a national public research university in Colombia, with general campuses in Bogotá, Medellín, Manizales and Palmira, and satellite campuses in Leticia, San Andrés, Arauca, Tumaco, and La Paz, Cesar.

Established in 1867 by an act of the Congress of Colombia, it is one of the largest universities in the country, with more than 53,000 students. The university grants academic degrees and offers 450 academic programmes, including 95 undergraduate degrees, 83 academic specializations, 40 medical specialties, 167 master's degrees, and 65 doctorates. Approximately 44,000 students are enrolled for an undergraduate degree and 8,000 for a postgraduate degree. It is also one of the few universities that employs postdoctorate fellows in the country.

The university is a member of the Association of Colombian Universities (ASCUN), the Iberoamerican Association of Postgraduate Universities (AUIP), and the Iberoamerican University Network Universia. Along with Antioquia and Valle universities, it is part of what is known as the Golden Triangle of higher education in Colombia, being among the most selective and competitive universities in the country.

The SCImago Institutions Rankings Iber by SCImago Research Group found that the National University of Colombia produced the largest number of scientific papers published in peer-refereed publications in the country, and was the 17th (14th in 2018) most prolific in Latin America. Furthermore, according to the Latin-American Web Ranking of Universities, the National University of Colombia ranks first place in internet presence in the country. As of June 2025, it is also among the ninth best university in Latin America. Among the universities of CIVETS countries, the National University occupied second place. Globally, the university was ranked #243, and #10 in Latin America by the QS World University Rankings in 2023, placing #2 in Colombia.

The institution offers a wide selection of programmes in both undergraduate and graduate levels, such as medicine, nursing, dentistry, engineering, chemistry, pharmacy, mathematics, physics, geology, biology, psychology, social sciences, arts (music, fine arts), languages, philosophy, and law. It was the first university in Colombia to open a computer science postgraduate program in 1967.

== Campuses ==
=== Bogotá branch ===
The University City of Bogotá (Spanish: Ciudad Universitaria de Bogotá), also known as the White City (Spanish: Ciudad Blanca), is the flagship University campus. It is located in the Teusaquillo locality, northwest of the historical center. It is also the largest campus in Colombia, with an area of 1,200,000 m^{2} (300 acres) and a constructed area of 308,541 m^{2} (76.242 acres), making it an ample campus with several green areas, open spaces, and pedestrian paths. Among its buildings there are 17 which have been declared national monuments and, as a whole, it is a representation of the last 60 years of architecture in Colombia.

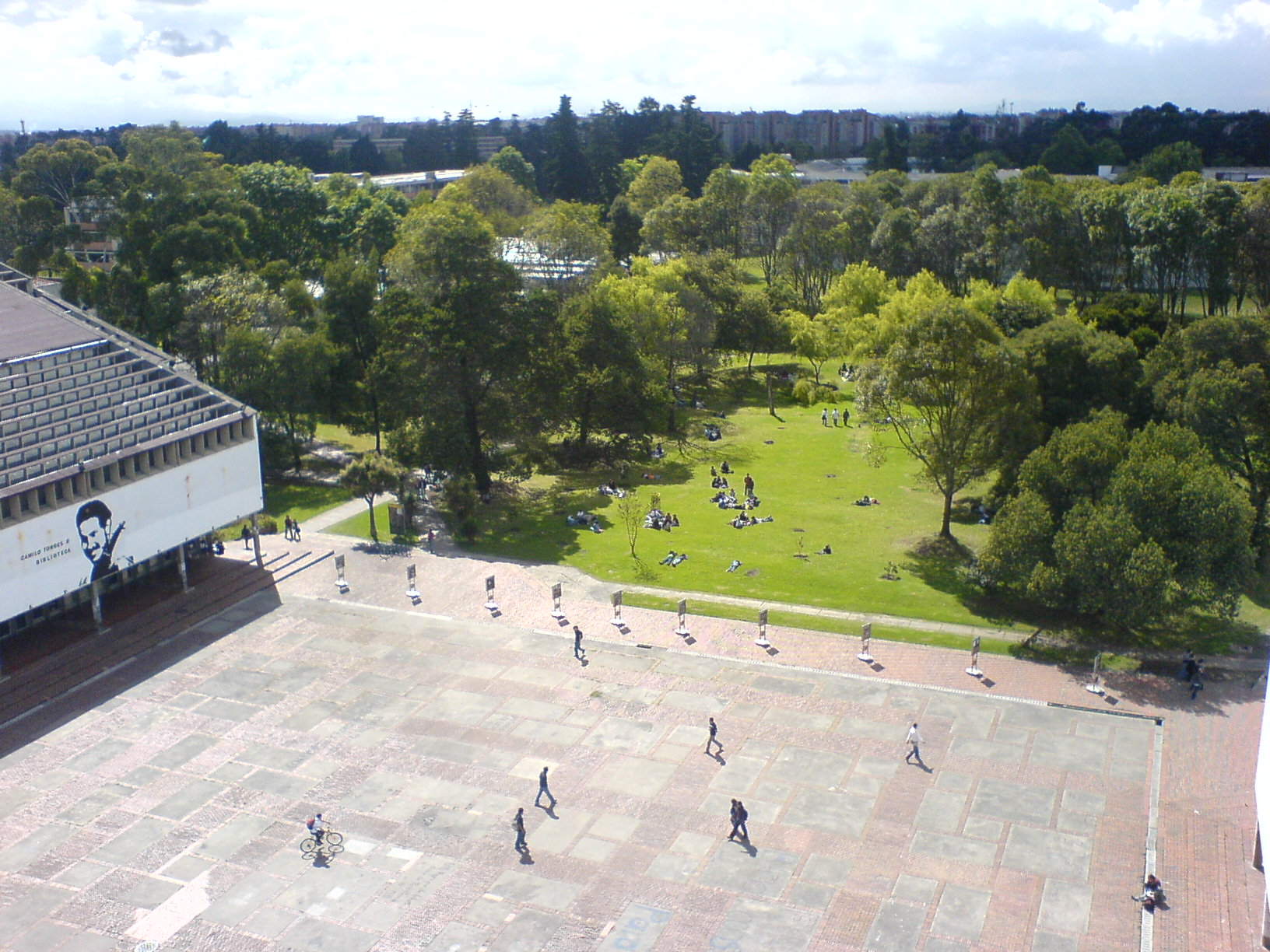
Central square, Bogota campus

The campus was designed by German educationalist Fritz Karsen and architect Leopold Rother, both refugees from Nazi Germany. Construction began in 1935, under the government of Alfonso López Pumarejo. It is organized into an ellipse, divided into five parts, each containing one academic division and its respective departments. From an aerial view, the shape of an owl can be seen, emblematic of a deep connection with wisdom and intuitive knowledge. The buildings were constructed as prismatic blocks, and painted white, in order to give an austere and clean look.

Some landmarks in the campus are the León de Greiff Auditorium, and the Francisco de Paula Santander Plaza, also known unofficially as the "Central Plaza". The campus has its own stadium, Alfonso López Pumarejo Stadium, where matches for the Colombian Professional Football are sometimes held.

=== Medellín branch ===
The National University of Colombia, Medellín has two campuses, the Central Campus and Robledo Campus, where 10,447 students study. This site provides approximately 29% of the seats for new students at National. Also this site has 555 faculty professors, of which 38% are doctors, 44% are master's, 8% were specialists and 10% are Professionals. This site offers 26 undergraduate and 73 graduate courses: 15 PhDs, 28 Masters, and 29 specializations.

Its history has given Medellín a peculiar character, since it was formed, as with most universities, from the classical degrees of Law, Medicine, Arts and Sciences. The site commenced with engineering programs, which is why Medellín today has the highest number of engineering programs (17) among all National University of Colombia campuses and in Colombia in general.

Central Campus: Located northwest of the city center, between El Volador hill eco-park and the Medellín River. Since 1938, it has been the headquarters of the National University of Colombia in Medellin, when the School of Tropical Agriculture (now the Faculty of Agricultural Sciences) joined the university. The Central Campus has an area of 272,982 m^{2}, the heart of campus has an area of 31,758 m^{2} and a portion of El Volador hill, around 269,257 m^{2}. Several learning centers can be found in at the campus including the Entomological Museum which was founded in 1937, the Museum of Mycology founded in 1987, the Herbarium "Gabriel Gutierrez," the wood collection, the Central Library "Efe Gomez" as an attractive artistic and architectural highlights, the Totem Mythic created by Master Pedro Nel Gomez, Block 41 declared a National Cultural, designed by Engineer Jesús Montoya Mejía which began in 1931, Block 11 designed by Master Pedro Nel Gómez.

Robledo Campus, also called core or more colloquially as the School of Mines, is located northwest of the city of Medellin, Robledo neighborhood is composed of three fields separated by the 80th street, which presents a difficult high-traffic pedestrian connection between the properties that make up the physical structure of the School of Mines, and Ingeominas, recently integrated into the university. It has an area of 100,978.69 m^{2}.

In 1886, the School of Mines was created and it was incorporated with the university in 1936, which is called today as the National School of Mines with approximately 3,500 students. It highlights the Museum of Geosciences, Maximum classroom buildings (block M5) and M3 block designed by Master Pedro Nel Gomez School of Mines in 1936. It was declared a National Monument in 1994 thanks to its architecture and its murals by the same Pedro Nel Gómez. The university in Medellín has five faculties of the schools offer twenty-five careers, nearly half of them are engineering at the School of Mines, also has three museums and other services.

== Academics ==
University rankings

Global – Overall
- ARWU World: 901–1000 (2023)
- QS World: =259 (2026)
- THE World: 1201–1500 (2024)
- USNWR Global: =662 (2023)

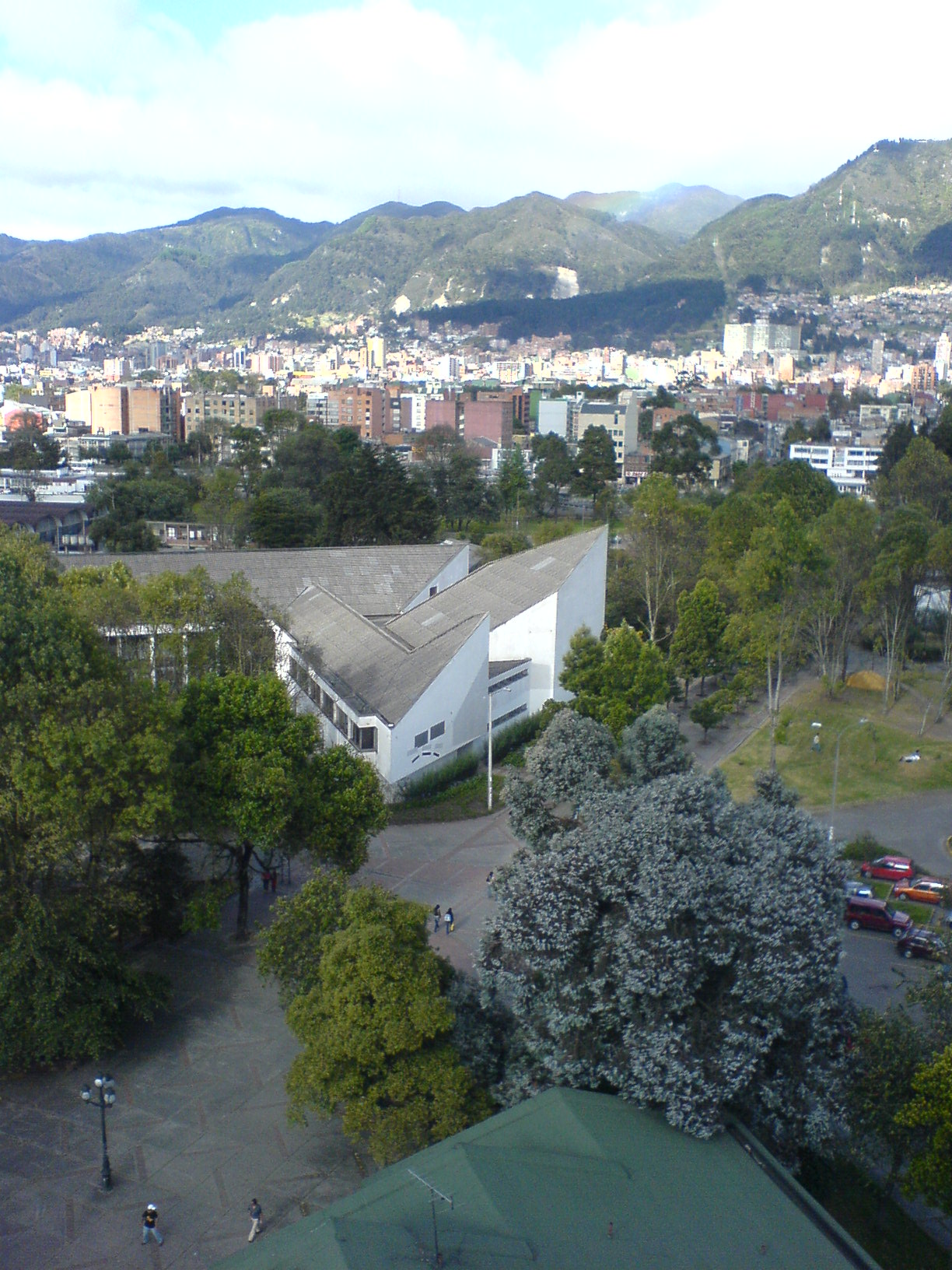
Music Conservatory

The National University of Colombia has 20 schools distributed among Bogotá, Medellín, Manizales and Palmira:

Departments in Bogotá:

- Agricultural Sciences
- Dentistry
- Economics sciences
- Engineering
- Fine Arts
- Human Sciences
- Law, Social and Political Sciences
- Medicine
- Nursing Faculty
- Science
- Veterinary Medicine and Animal Management

Interfaculty institutes

- Institute of Biotechnology
- Institute of Science and Food Technology - ICTA
- Institute of Environmental Studies - IDEA-
- Institute of Studies in Communication - IECO-
- International institute of Political Studies and Relations - IEPRI-
- Genetics Institute

Museums in Bogotá Campus:

- Casa Museo Jorge Eliécer Gaitán (Jorge Eliecer Gaitan Museum)
- Museo de Arte Universidad Nacional de Colombia (National University's Art Museum)
- Museo de Arquitectura Leopoldo Rother (Leopoldo Rother Museum of Architecture)
- Museo de Historia Natural (Museum of Natural History)
- Museo de la Ciencia y el Juego (Museum of Science and Games)
- Museo Centro de Historia de la Medicina (Museum Centre of the History of Medicine)
- Museo Entomológico (Entomological Museum)
- Observatorio Astronómico Nacional (National Astronomical Observatory)

High school (for children of professors, students, and employees):

- "Arturo Ramírez Montúfar" Pedagogical Institute - IPARM-

Departments in Medellín:

- Sciences
- Agricultural Sciences
- Mines
- Economics and Humans Sciences
- Architecture

Museums in Medellín Campus:

- Earth Sciences Museum
- Entomological Museum
- Mycology museum
- "Gabriel Gutiérrez" Herbarium
- Xiloteca

Institutes:

- Centre for Research in Extractive Metallurgy - CIMEX
- Energy Institute
- Institute for Systems and Decision Sciences
- System Institute
- Institute of Materials
- Water Institute
- Fuel Centre
- Institute of Environmental Studies - IDEA

Media:

- Unimedios
  - News agency (Agencia de Noticias UN)
  - Internal newspaper (Carta Universitaria)
  - Radio station (UN Radio)
  - Academic newspaper (UN Periódico, with articles ranging from international issues to research within the colleges)
  - UN Televisión (TV production company)
  - Prisma TV (internet television)

== Noted people ==
=== List of chancellors ===
- 1949-1950, Jaime Jaramillo Arango
- 1964-1965, José Félix Patiño Restrepo
- 1965, Rafael Casas Morales
- 1966-1967, Guillermo Rueda Montaña
- 1967-1969, Jorge Méndez Munevar
- 1969, Luis Forero Nogares
- 1969-1970, Enrique Carvajal Arjona
- 1970-1971, Mario Latorre Rueda
- 1971, Diego López Arango
- 1971, Miguel Hernández Cárdenas
- 1971-1972, Santiago Fonseca Martínez
- 1972, Jorge Arias De Greiff
- 1972-1974, Luis Duque Gómez
- 1974, Eduardo Cortéz Mendoza
- 1974-1975, Luis Pérez Velasco
- 1975-1976, Luis Mesa Velásquez
- 1977, Osmar Correal Cabral
- 1977-1978, Emilio Aljure Nasser
- 1978-1980, Ramsés Hakim Murad
- 1980-1982, Eduardo Brieva Bustillo
- 1982, Francisco Varela Aunjell
- 1982-1984, Fernando Sánchez Torres
- 1984-1988, Marco Palacios Rozo
- 1988-1990, Ricardo Mosquera Mesa
- 1990-1991, Darío Valencia Restrepo
- 1991-1993, Antanas Mockus Sivickas
- 1994-1997, Guillermo Páramo Rocha
- 1997-2003, Víctor Manuel Moncayo Cruz
- 2003-2005, Marco Antonio Palacios Rozo
- 2005-2006, Ramón Fayad Nafah
- 2006-2012, Moisés Wasserman Lérner
- 2012-2018, Ignacio Mantilla Prada
- 2018-2024, Dolly Montoya Castaño
- 2024-2025, Leopoldo Múnera Ruiz

=== Notable alumni ===
Notable alumni include:

- Peter Angritt
- Carolina Benedetti
- Jorge Eliécer Gaitán
- Fernando Botero
- Omar-Darío Cardona Arboleda
- Jaime Jaramillo Arango
- Fernando Vallejo
- Gabriel García Márquez
- Carlos Jacanamijoy
- Hernando Osorio
- Manuel Elkin Patarroyo
- Rodrigo Bernal
- Julio Garavito Armero
- Nelly Garzón Alarcón
- León de Greiff
- Leopold Rother
- Totó la Momposina
- Sonny Jiménez de Tejada
- Diana Pombo
- Rogelio Salmona
- Salomón Hakim
- Belkis Florentina Izquierdo Torres
- Antanas Mockus
- Jaime Garzón
- Jorge Velosa
- Luis Carlos Sarmiento Angulo
- José Eustasio Rivera
- Zuleika Suarez
- Luis Villar Borda
- Tatiana Toro
- Guillermina Uribe Bone

=== Notable faculty ===
- Claudia Patricia Vaca Gonzalez - Colombian pharmaceutical chemist and associate professor who specializes in pharmacoepidemiology

== Gallery ==
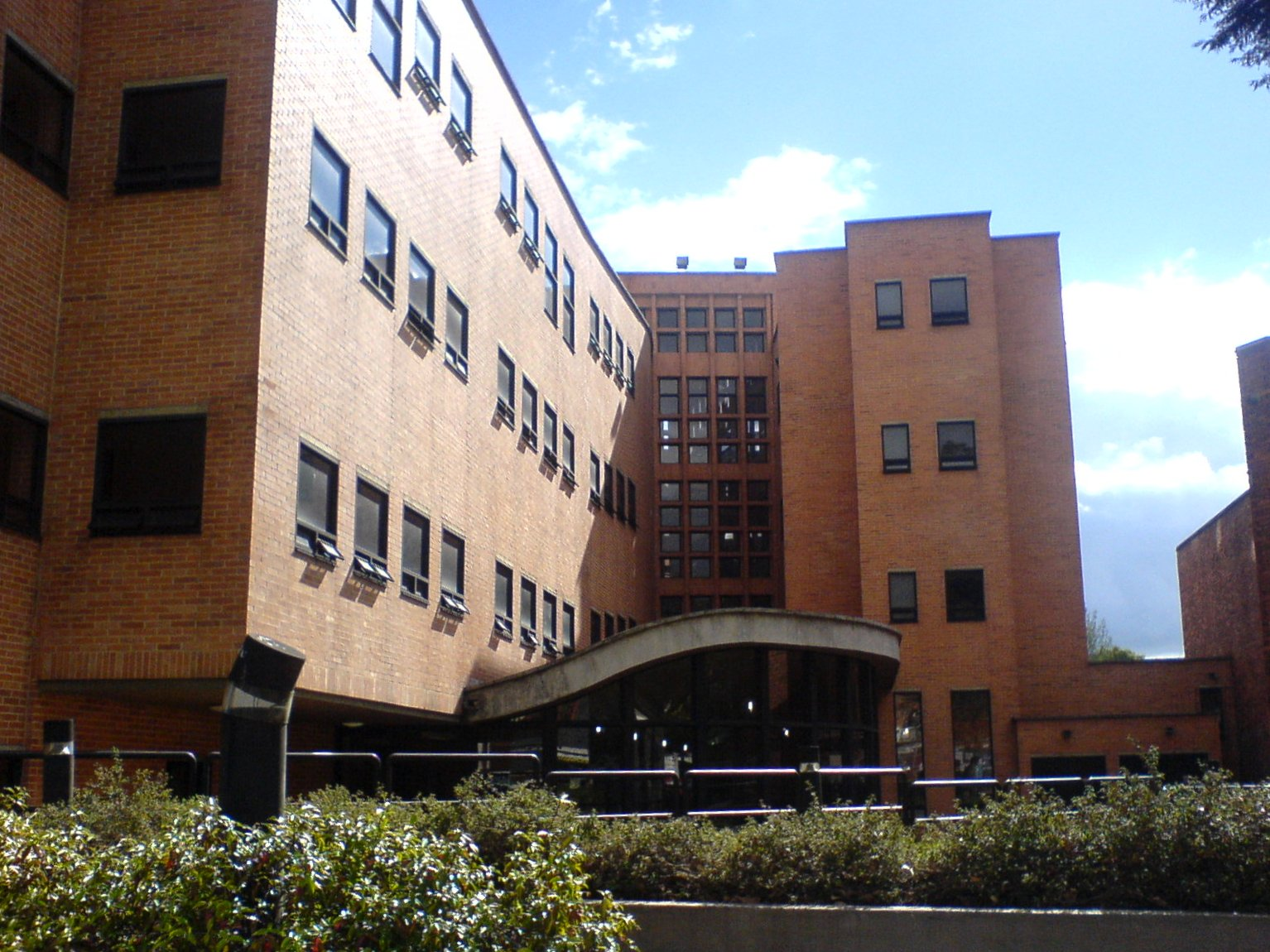
School of Economics

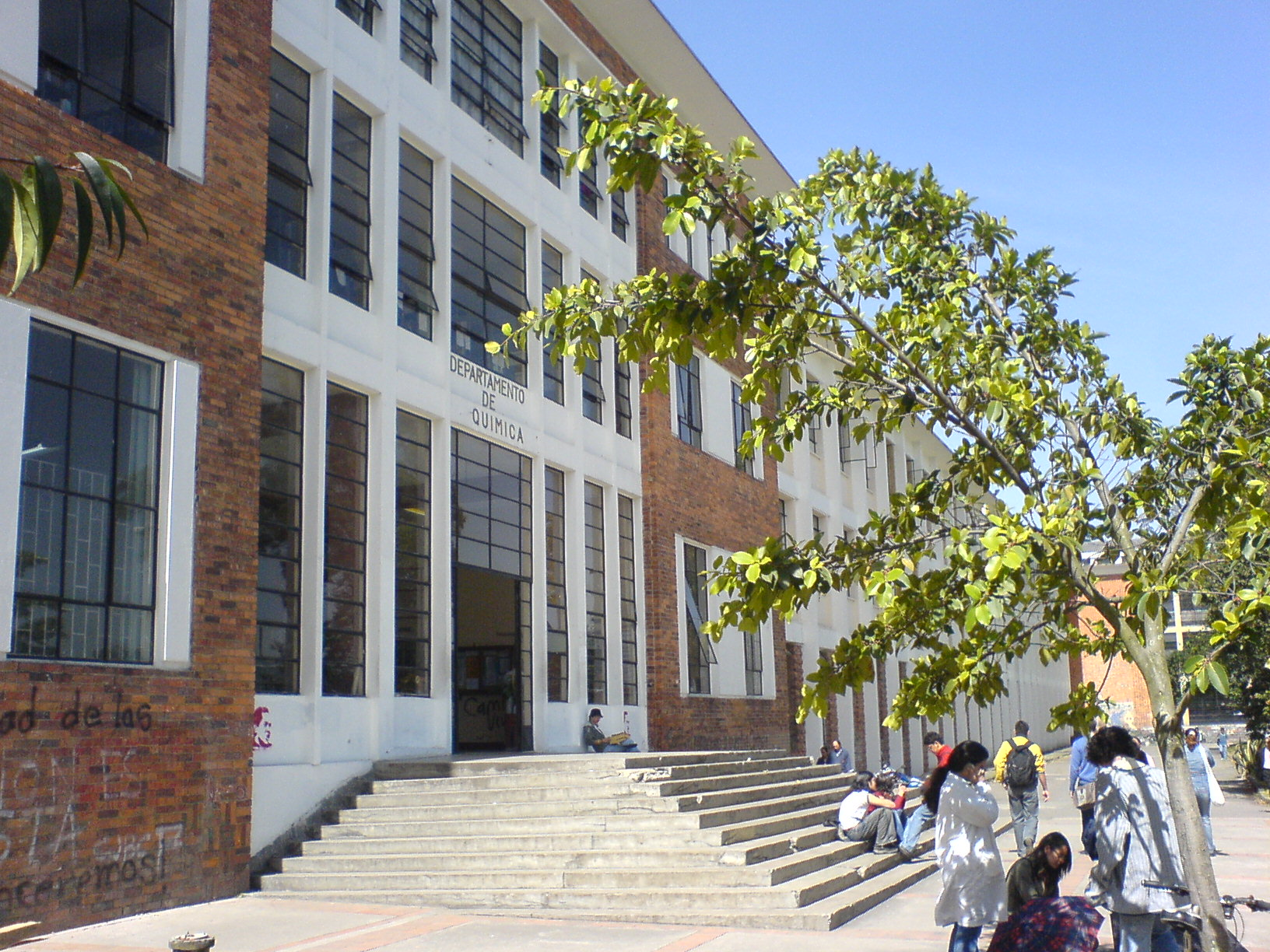
Chemistry Department

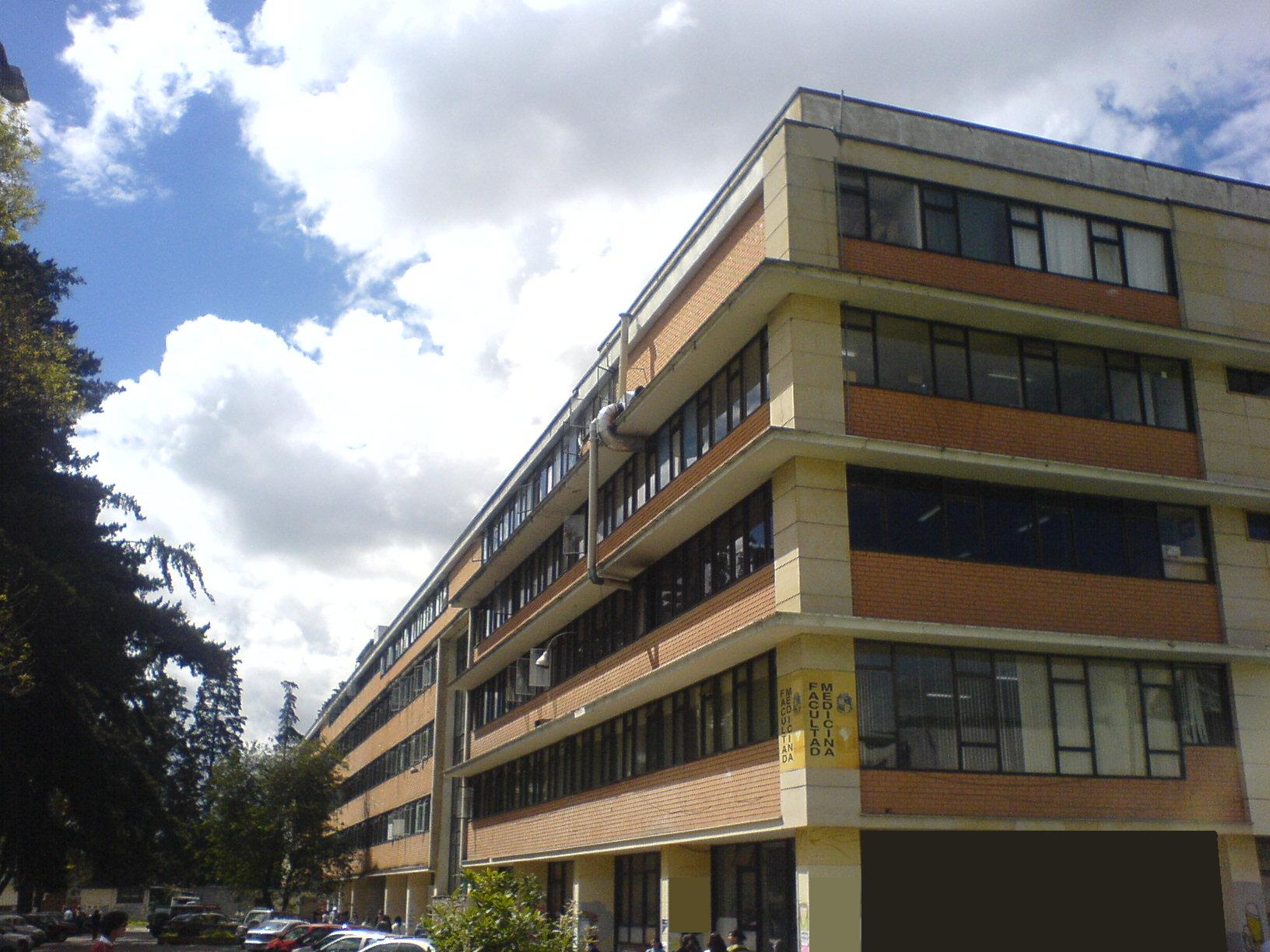
College of Medicine

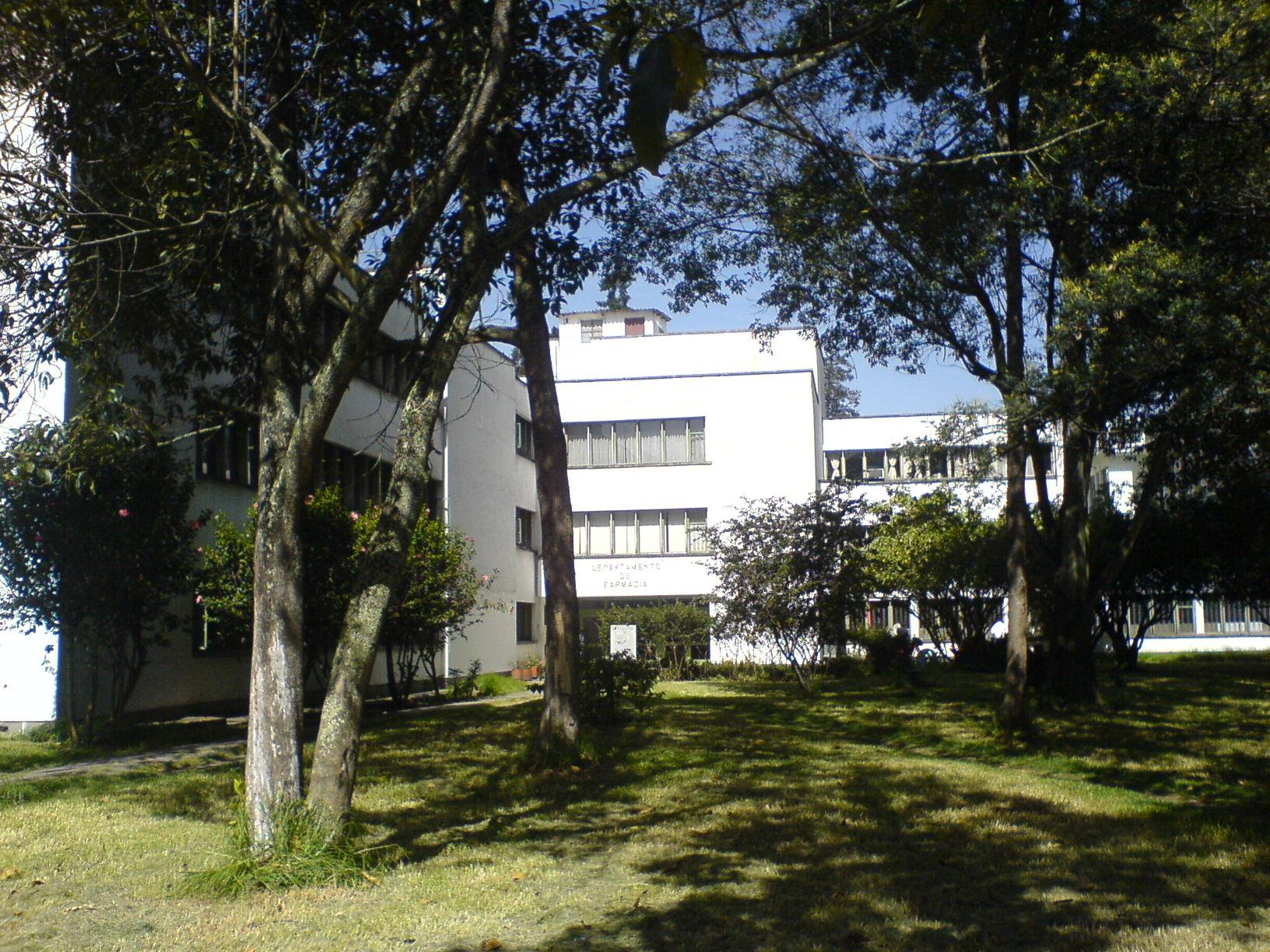
Pharmacy Department

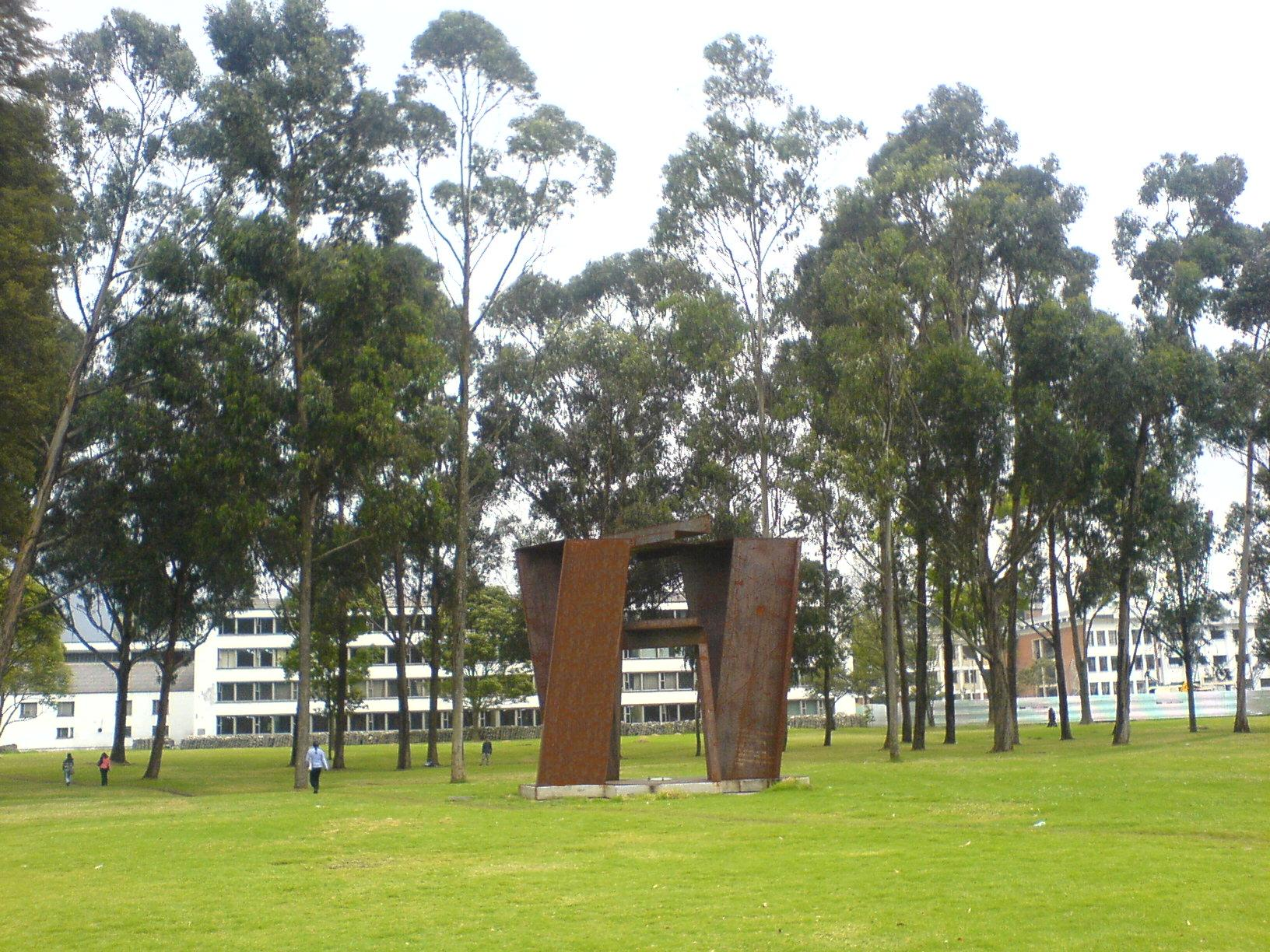
Sculpture Park

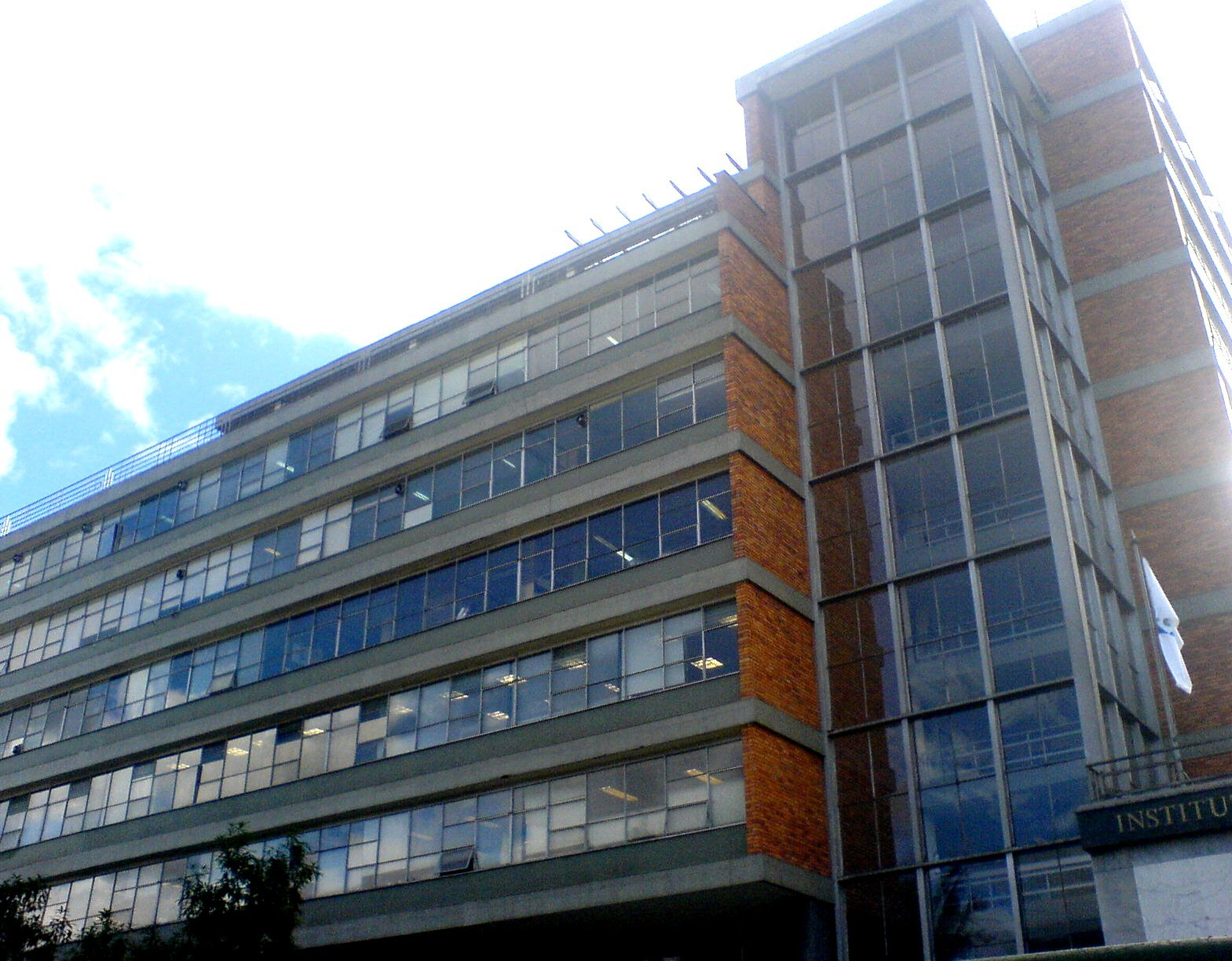
Agustín Codazzi Geographic Institute

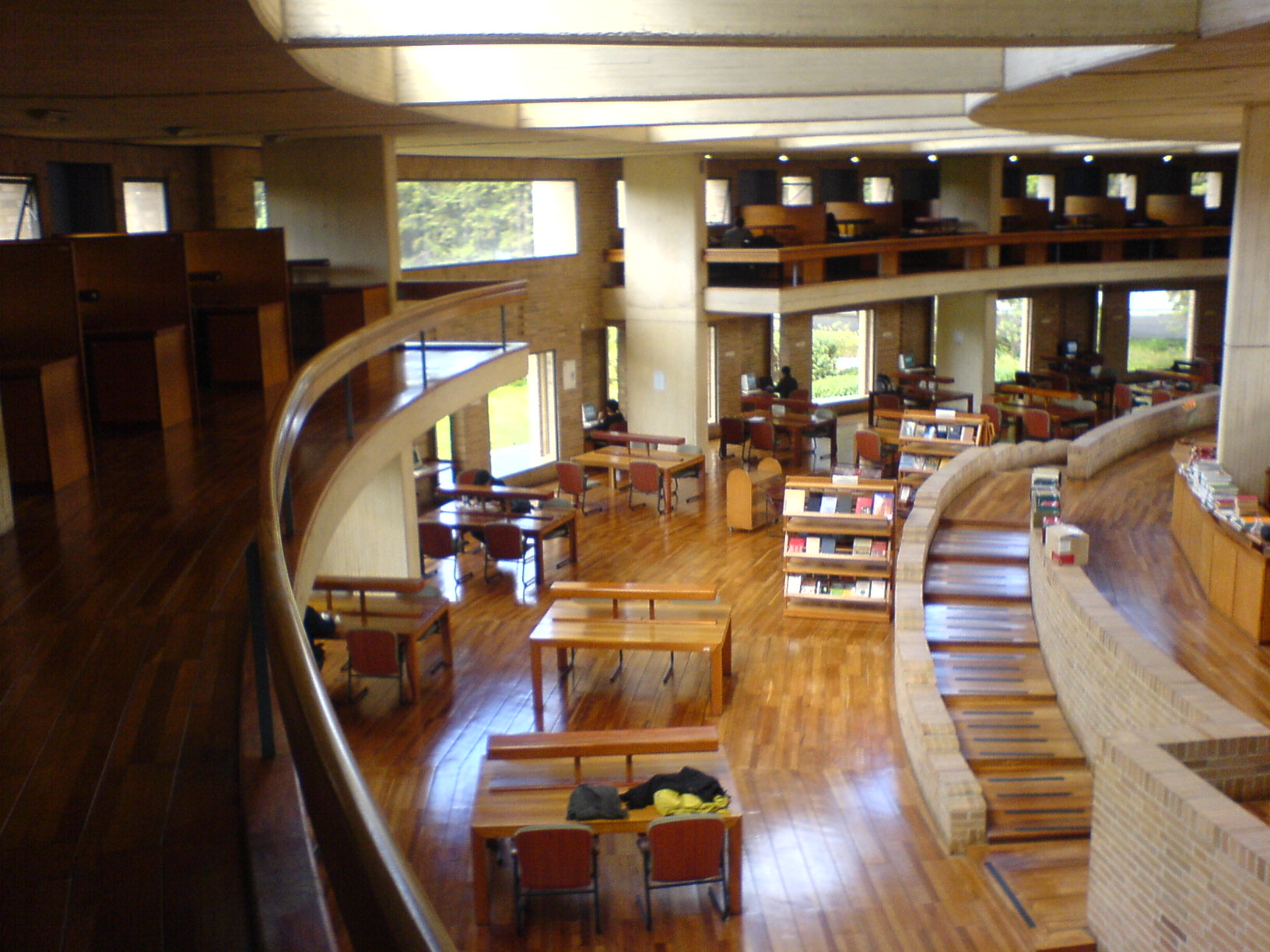
Ernesto Guhl Library

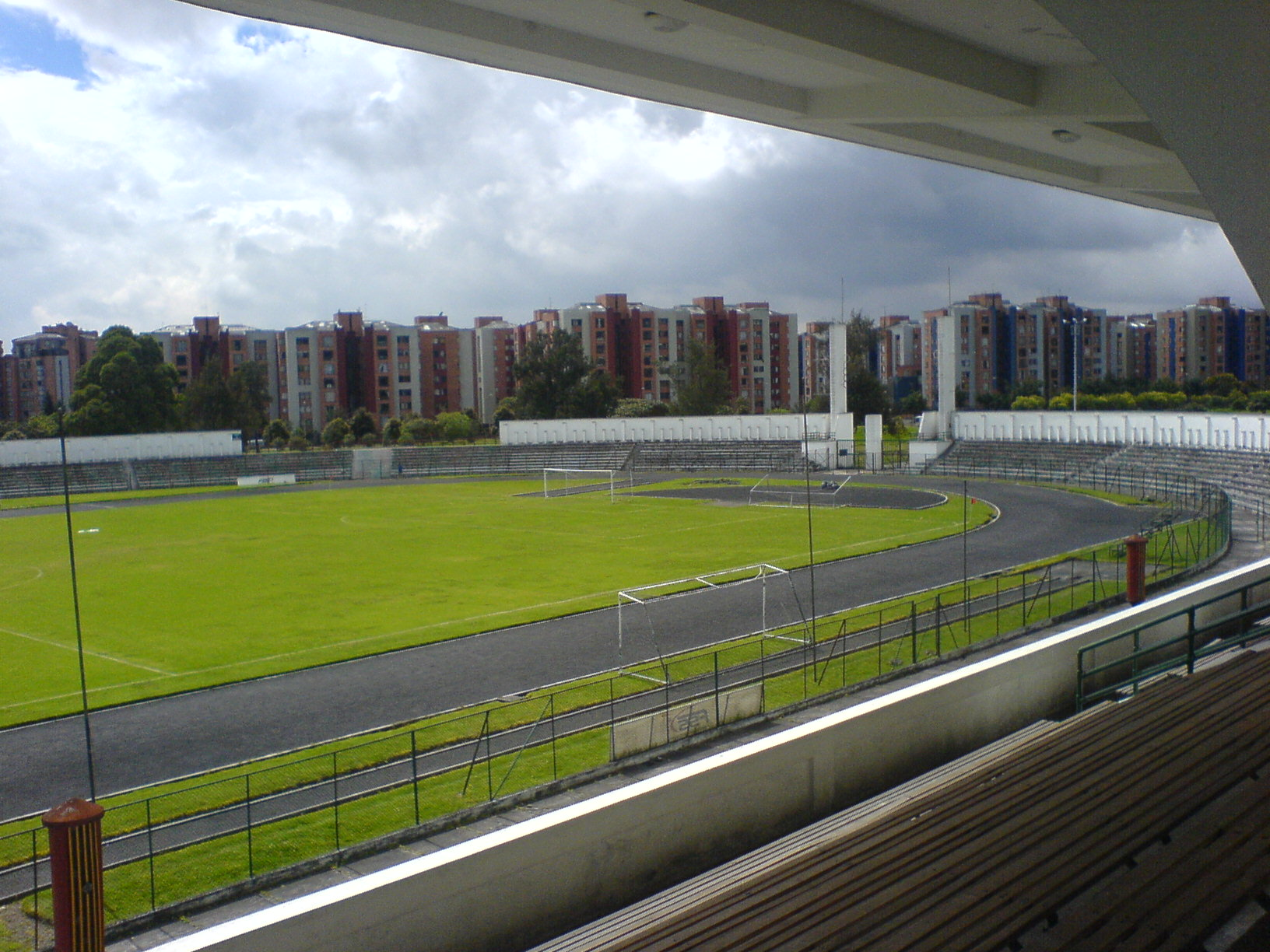
Alfonso López Pumarejo Stadium

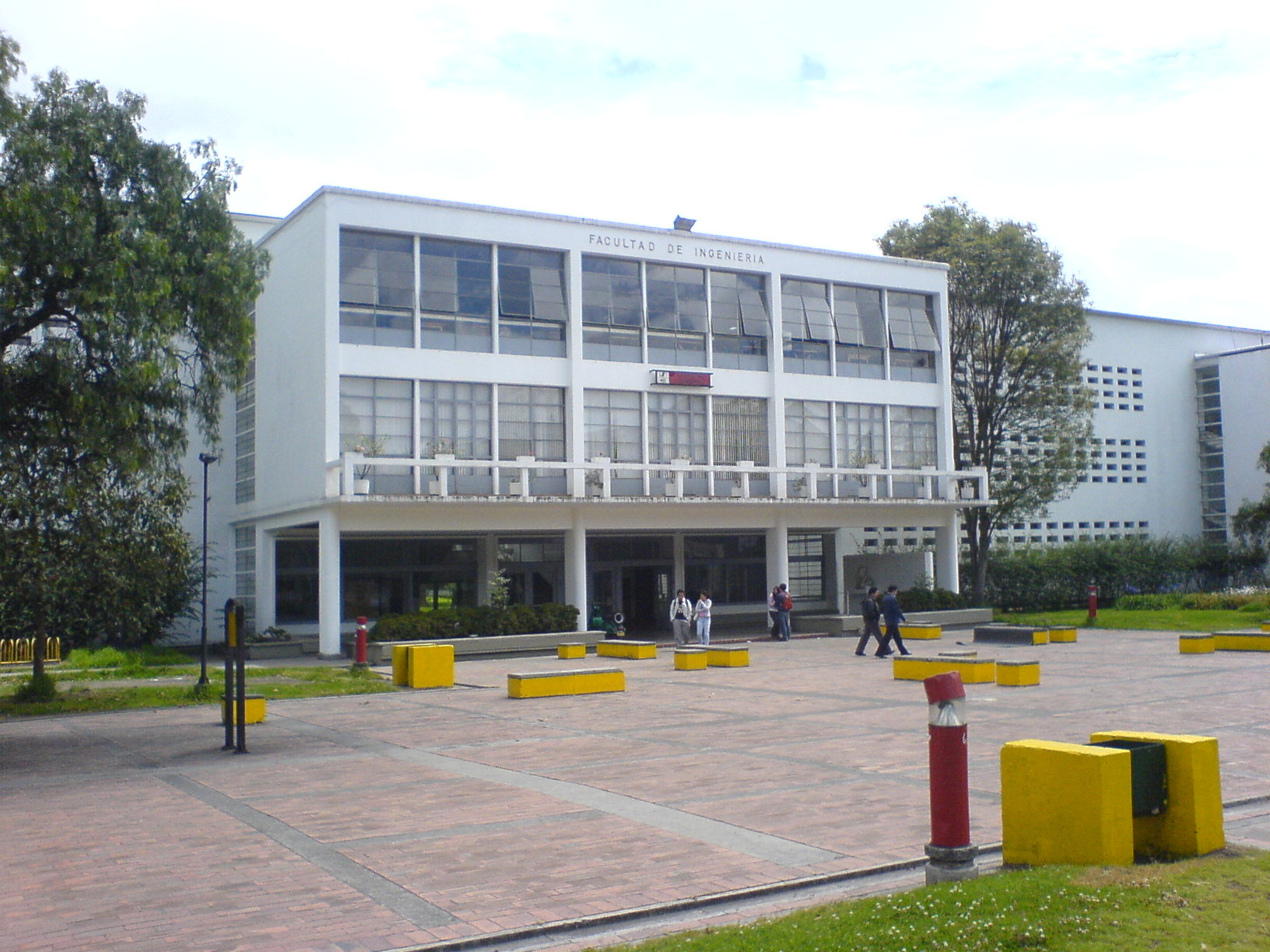
School of Engineering

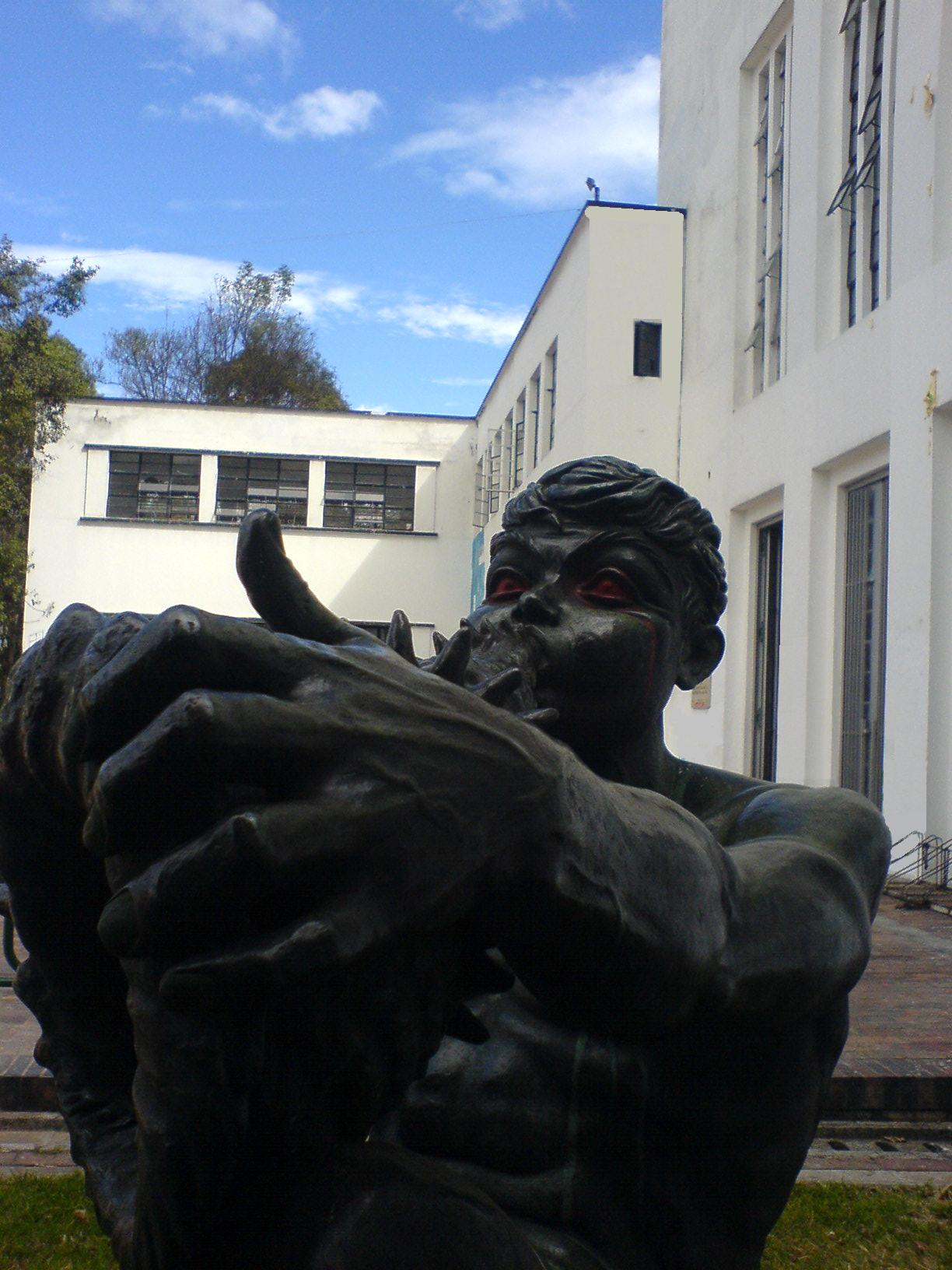
Fine Arts

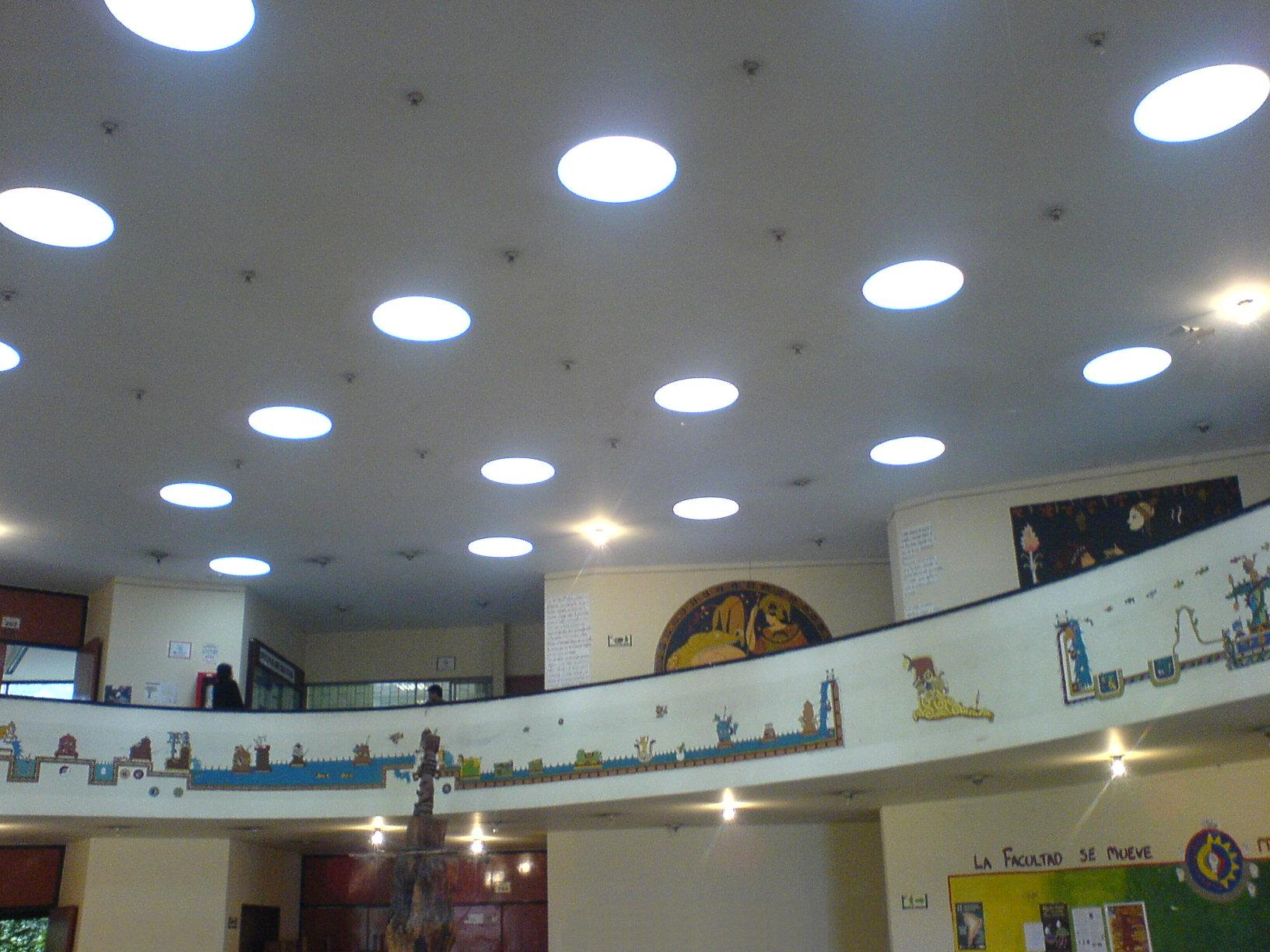
Sociology

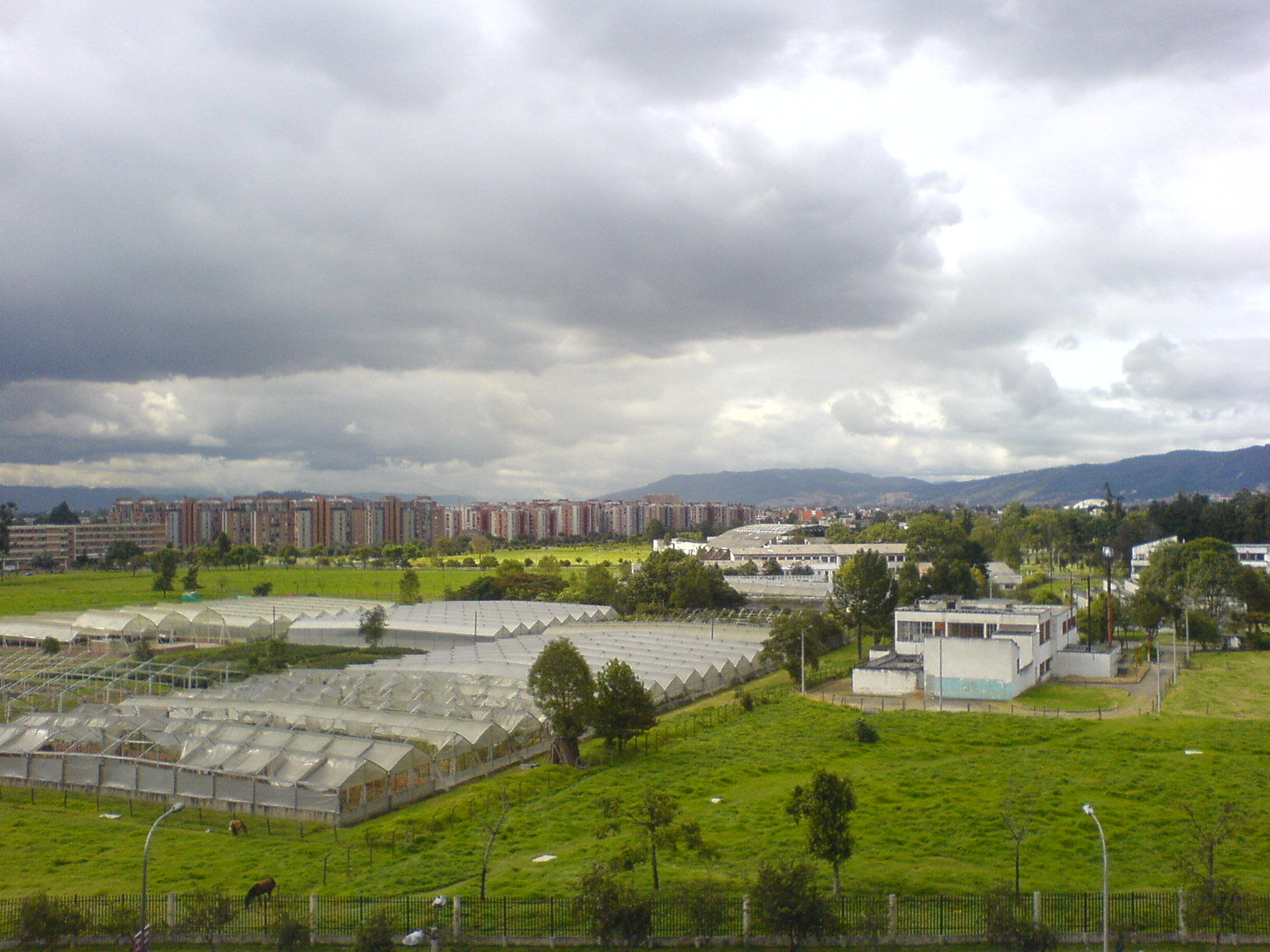
School of Agronomy

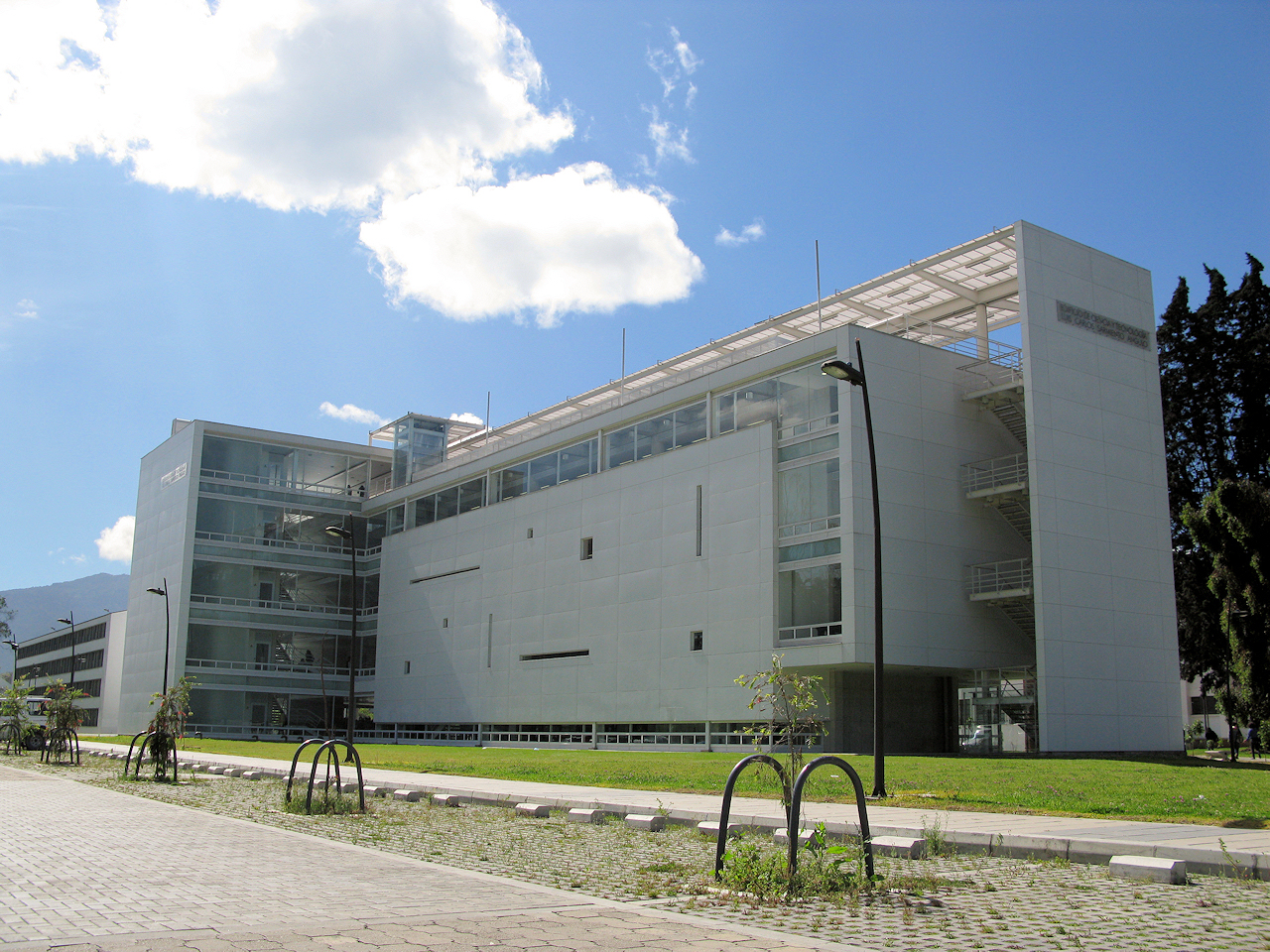
Library of Science and Technology

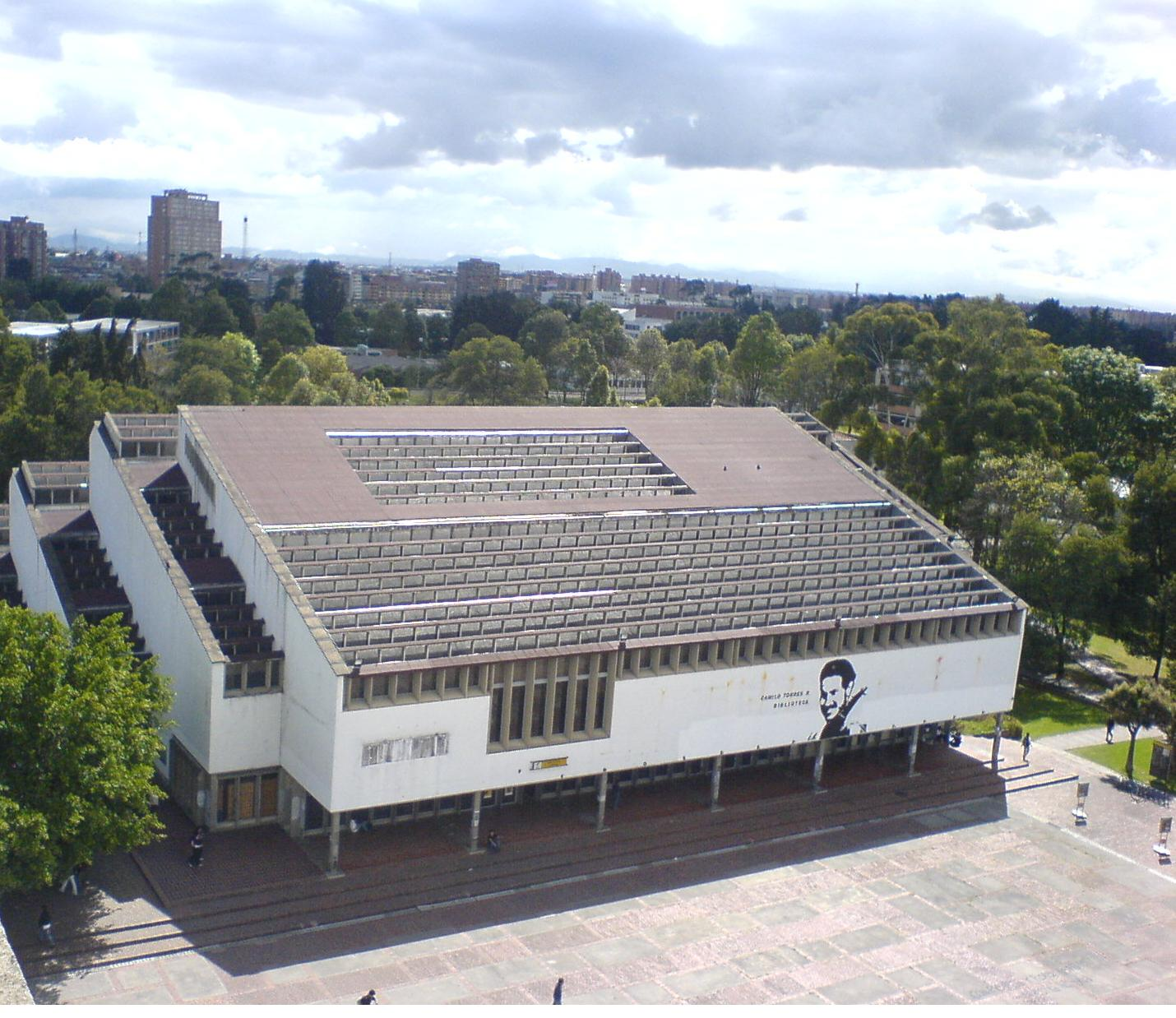
Central Library
(“Biblioteca Gabriel García Márquez”)

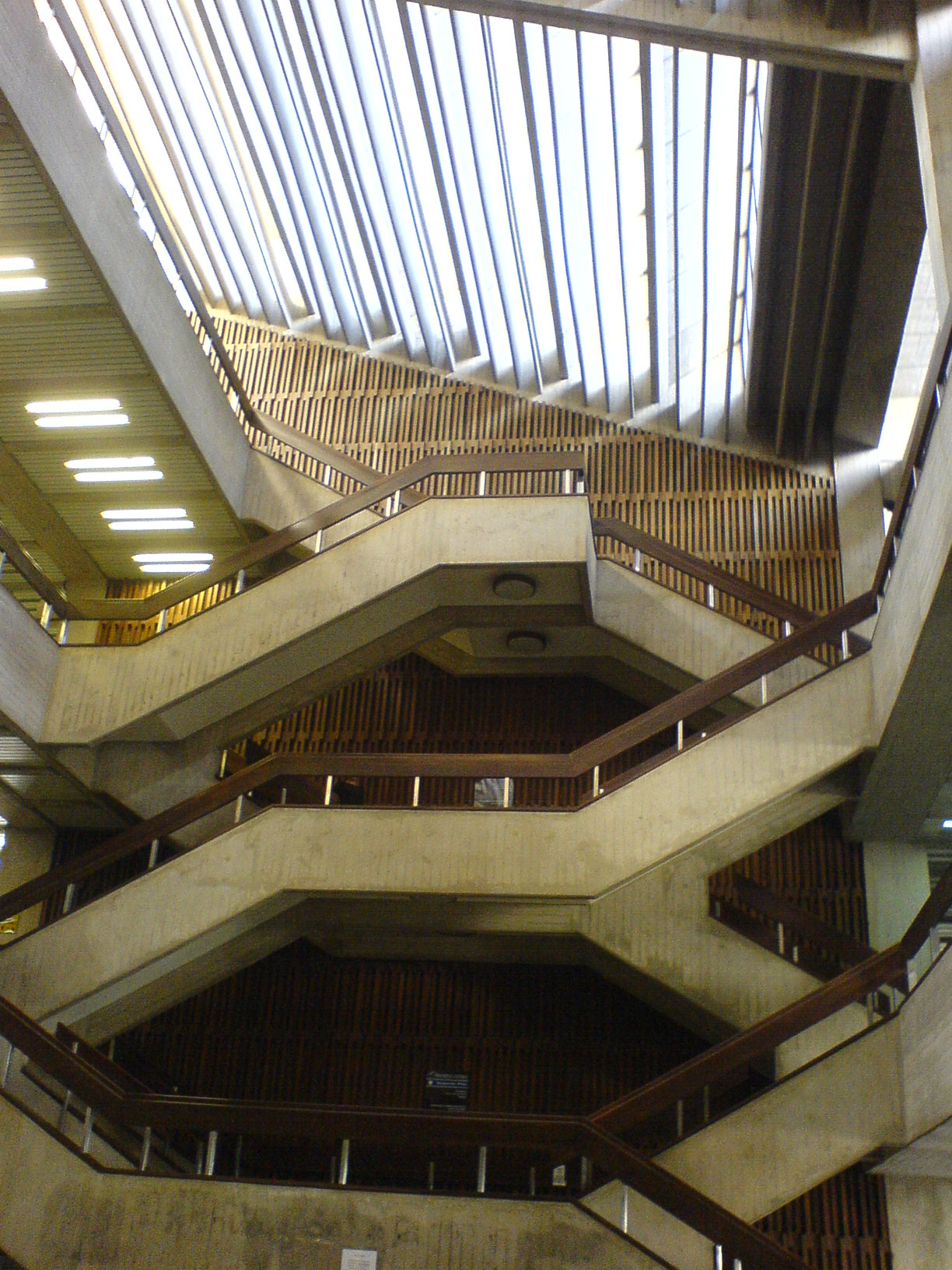
Central Library (lobby view)

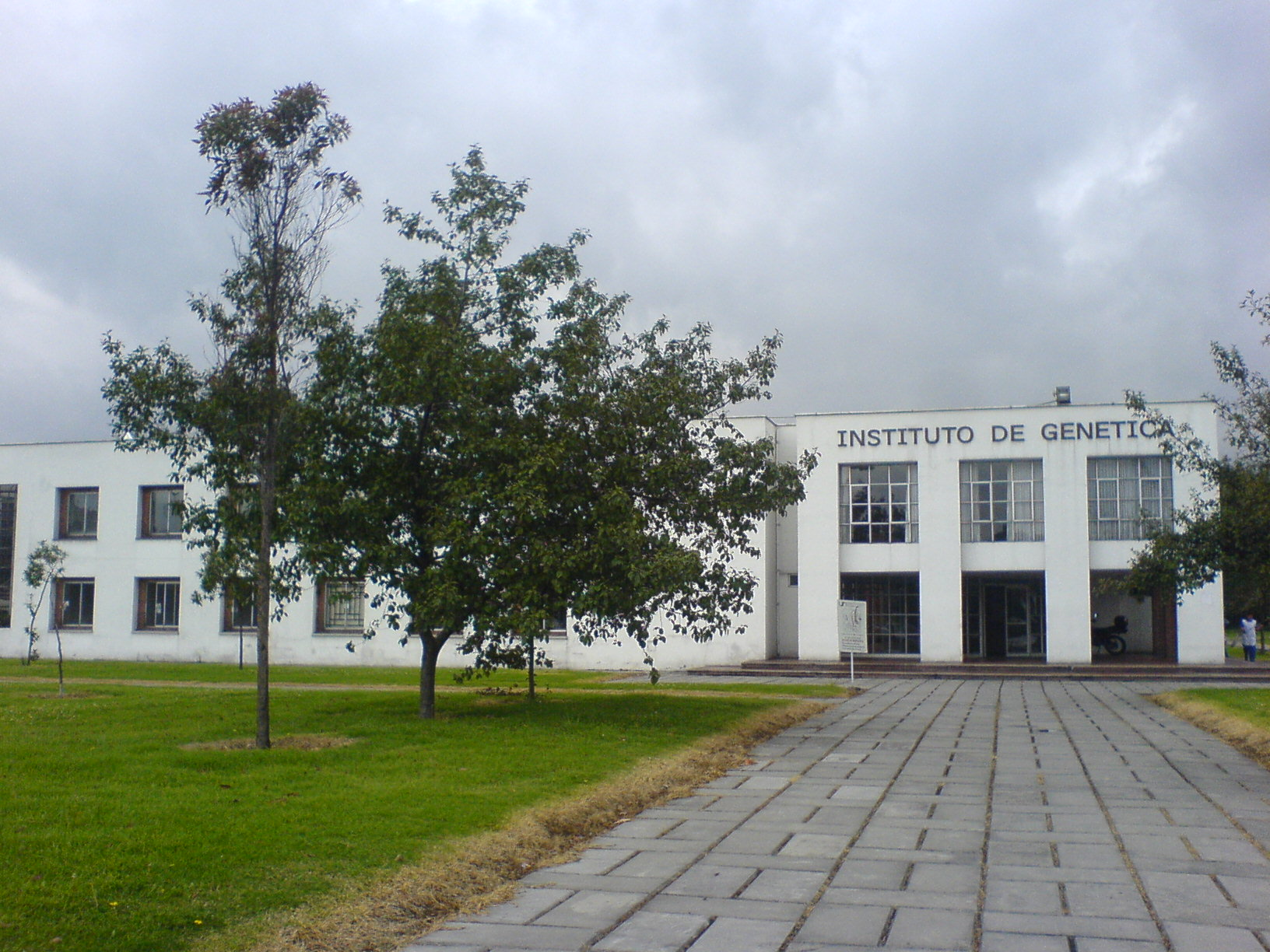
Genetics Institute

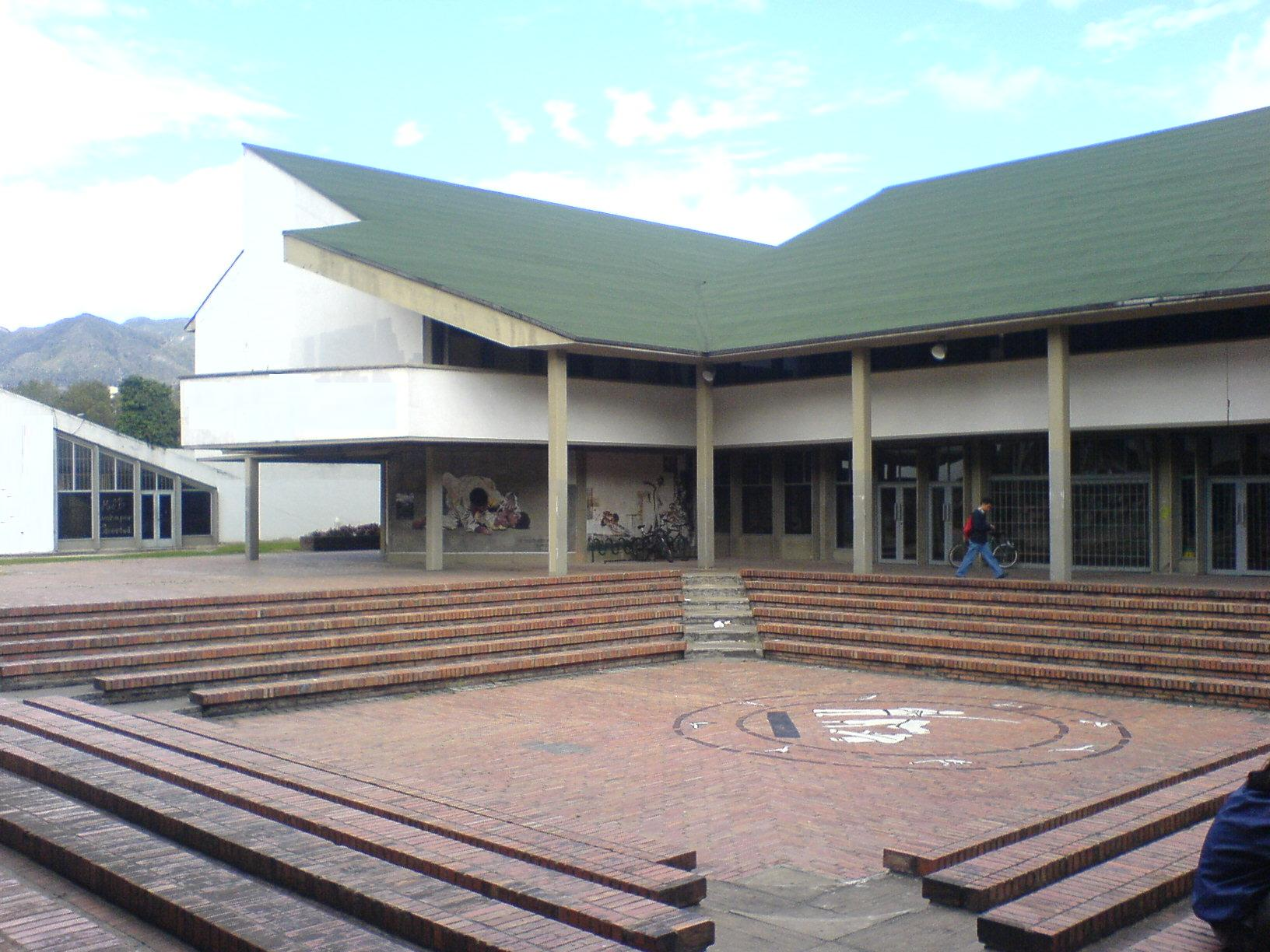
"La Perola" Central Dinning Court, classrooms and office of the registrar

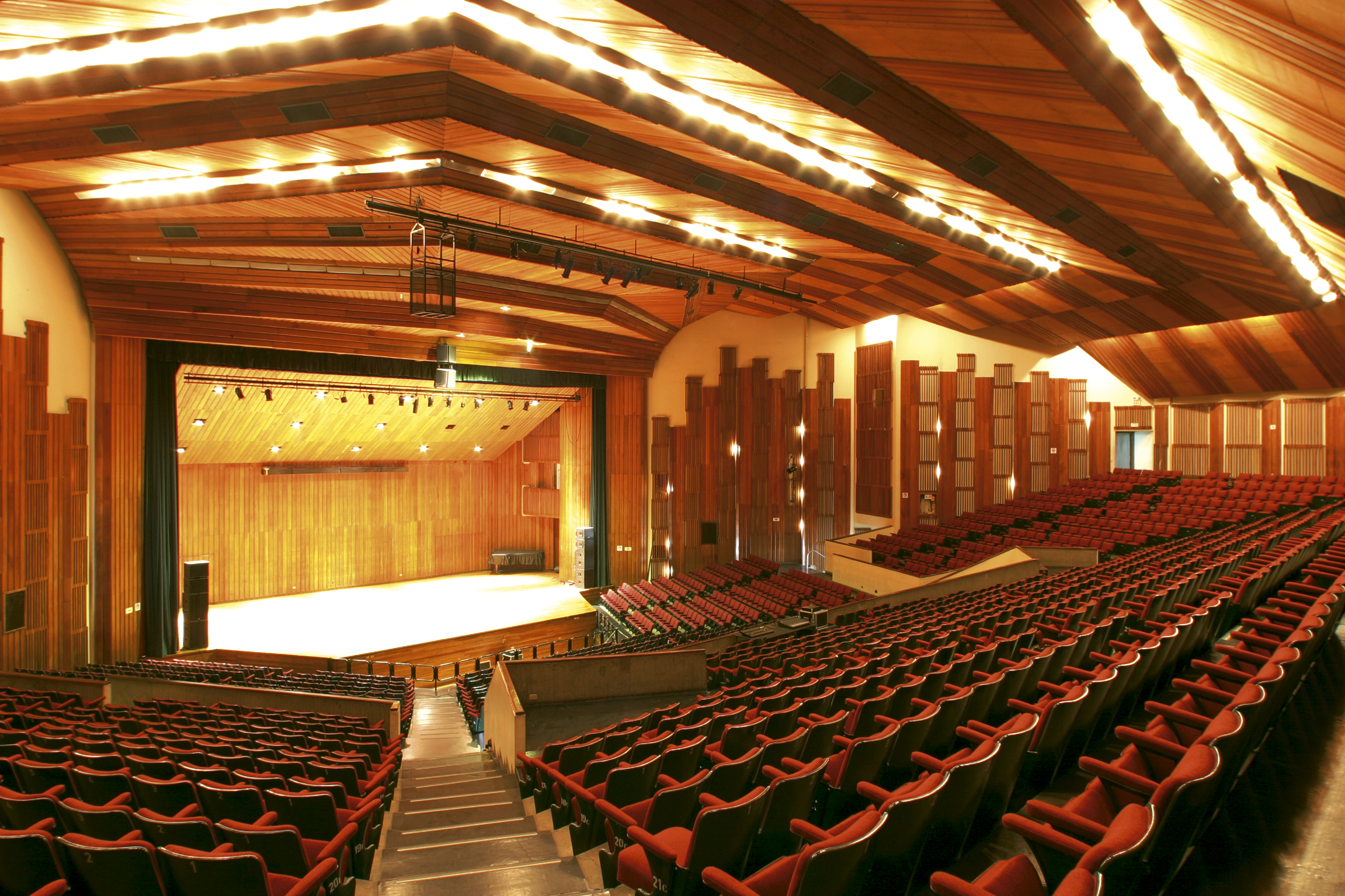
León de Greiff Auditorium

== See also ==
- List of universities in Colombia
- List of Muisca research institutes
