= Hernando Osorio =

Colombian artist (born 1953)

Jaime Hernando Osorio (born 27 September 1953 in Ibagué) is a Colombian painter and print-maker. Educated at the National University of Colombia, he was a member of the Awuyaka street art group. During his New York City period (1981–1985) he focused on etching and lithography. Since 1985 he has been living and working in Vienna, Austria.

He is a member of Galerie Sur.

His work is represented in the following collections:

- Victoria and Albert Museum, London
- Bibliothèque nationale de France, Paris
- The Library of Congress Print Collection, Washington D.C.
- Graphische Sammlung Albertina, Vienna, Austria
- The New York Public Library, New York, N.Y.
- Museo de Arte, Universidad Nacional de Colombia
- Museo Rayo, Roldanillo, Colombia
- Círculo de Periodistas de Bogotá
- The Printmaking Workshop, New York, N.Y.
- Palais de la Culture, Asilah, Morocco
- Collection of the Austrian Federal Ministry of Culture, Vienna, Austria
- Collection of the cultural department of the City of Vienna, Austria
- Collection of Silver Bow Art, Butte, MT
