= Leopold Rother =

German-born Colombian architect (1894–1978)

Leopold Siegfried Rother Cuhn
- Born: 27 August 1894; Germany
- Died: 3 July 1978 (aged 83)
- Occupation(s): Architect, urban planner, educator
- Buildings: Campus of the National University of Colombia (Universidad Nacional de Colombia) in Bogotá

Leopold Siegfried Rother Cuhn (27 August 1894 – 3 July 1978) was a German-born Colombian architect, urban planner and educator.

He developed projects, particularly in Colombia, including the design of the campus of the National University of Colombia (Universidad Nacional de Colombia) in Bogotá.
