= Antioquia Batholith =

Region of rock features in Colombia

- Stratigraphic range: Campanian; ~77–71 Ma
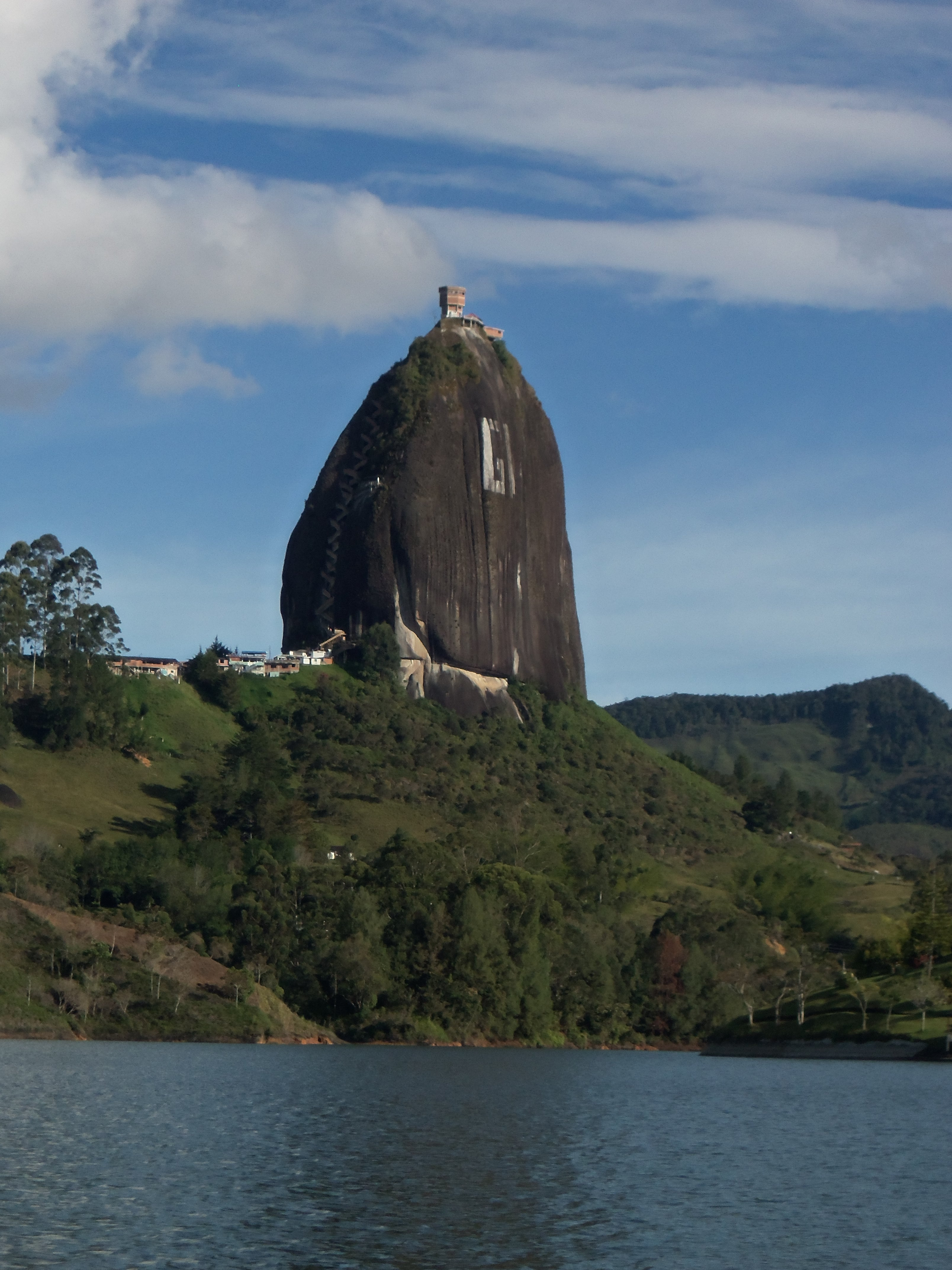
- El Peñón de Guatapé, part of the Antioquia Batholith
- Type: Batholith
- Unit of: Central Ranges, Andes
- Underlies: El Vergel Beds, alluvium
- Area: 7,800 km^{2} (3,000 sq mi)

Lithology
- Primary: Hornblende-biotite tonalite-granodiorite
- Other: Gabbro-granite

Location
- Location: San Andrés de Cuerquia, San José de la Montaña, San Jerónimo, San Luis, San Rafael, San Roque, San Vicente, Alejandría, Angostura, Barbosa, Belmira, Carolina del Príncipe, Don Matías, Entrerríos, Girardota, Gómez Plata, Granada, Guatapé, Marinilla, El Santuario, Santo Domingo, Santa Rosa de Osos
- Coordinates: 06°27′N 75°11′W
- Region: Antioquia
- Country: Colombia

Type section
- Named for: Antioquia
- Named by: Botero
- Year defined: 1942
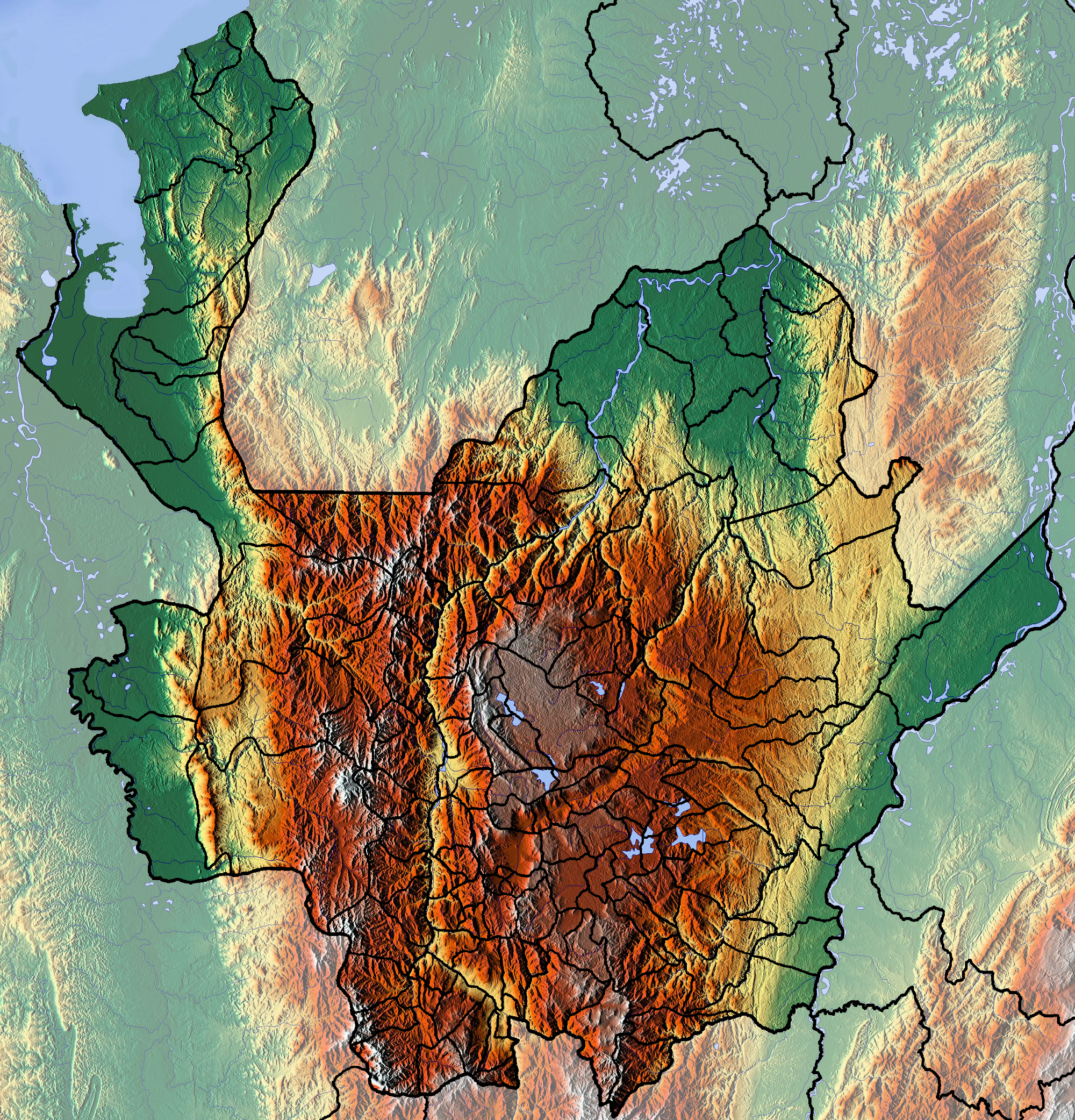
- The Antioquia Batholith clearly visible as a circular feature in central Antioquia

The Antioquia Batholith (Spanish: Batolito Antioqueño, Ksta, Kqd, K2ba) is a cluster of plutons located in and named after Antioquia, Colombia. The plutons stretch over an area of about 7,800 square kilometres (3,000 sq mi), and intruded and cooled in Late Cretaceous times. Much of the batholith is weathered into a 40 metres (130 ft) thick saprolite mantle. In some locations this saprolite reaches thicknesses of about 200 metres (660 ft). The development of this weathering is attributed to the humid climate and to stable conditions with limited amounts of erosion. Where the batholith-derived saprolite is eroded, inselbergs, such as El Peñón de Guatapé, crop out. Inselbergs correspond to rock masses of the batholith that resisted weathering and erosion by being less fractured.

== Etymology ==
The batholith was named after Antioquia by Botero in 1942, after various authors as Boussignault in 1825, Ospina in 1911, Scheibe in 1933 and Posada in 1936 mentioned its existence.

== Geology ==
The batholith varies in composition between hornblende-biotite tonalite to granodiorite, with lateral variations between gabbro to granite. Common minerals are hornblende, quartz, plagioclase, K-feldspar, biotite and amphibole, with traces of epidote, chlorite and sphene. The batholith underlies the municipalities San Andrés de Cuerquia, San José de la Montaña, in the east of San Jerónimo, around Belmira, in Don Matías, Girardota, Gómez Plata, Entrerríos, Carolina del Príncipe, Barbosa, Santo Domingo, and Santa Rosa de Osos. Because of profound weathering, outcrops are scarce and restricted to riverbeds, and at El Peñón de Guatapé. To the northwest of the urban center of Santa Rosa de los Osos, bauxite mineralizations of the batholith are found.

=== Origin ===
The batholith intruded the Triassic San Isidro Granulite, Ceja Gneiss and Medellín Amphibolite, schists of the Valdivia Group, and migmatites of the Ayura Montebello Group. Xenoliths of those host rocks in which the batholith intruded consist of quartz-mica schists, amphibolites and gneisses. In certain places, the batholith is overlain by the El Vergel Beds, alluvium and other Quaternary deposits.

=== Tectonics ===
In Belmira, the Río Chico Fault places the Medellín Dunite against the Antioquia Batholith. The Otú-Pericos Fault places the Antioquia Batholith in contact with the Jurassic Segovia Batholith. The Espíritu Santo Fault runs just north of the batholith near San Andrés de Cuerquia. Other faults cross-cutting the batholith are:

- Balseadero Fault
- Biscocho Fault
- Caldera Fault
- Miraflores Fault
- Monteloro Fault
- Nare Fault

=== Age ===
A 2019 summary of ages obtained for the batholith show that the batholith formed in a protracted manner from 97 to 58 million years ago (Ma), that is from the Late Cretaceous to the Paleocene. For the main part of the intrusion there is a best estimate of the age between 71 ± 1.2 and 77 ± 1.7 Ma, suggesting an intrusion age near the boundary of the Campanian and Maastrichtian.

== Hydrology ==
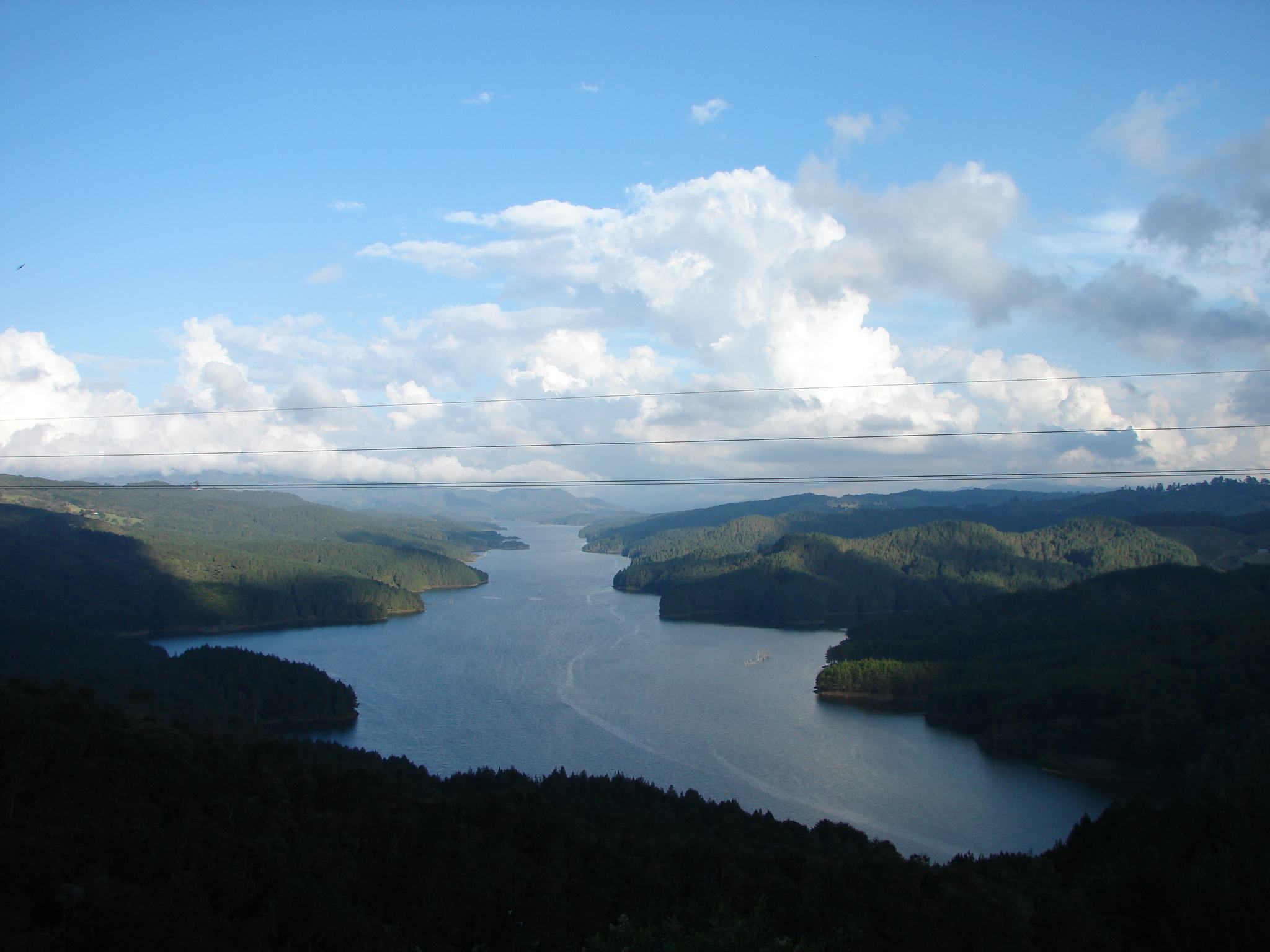
Río Grande Reservoir

The Medellín River cross-cuts the batholith from southwest to northeast, where it flows in the Porce River. The following reservoirs are situated entirely on the batholith:

- Miraflores Reservoir
- Las Playas Reservoir
- Guatapé Reservoir
- Río Grande Reservoir
- San Lorenzo Reservoir
- Troneras Reservoir
