= Santa Rosa de Osos =

- Municipality and city
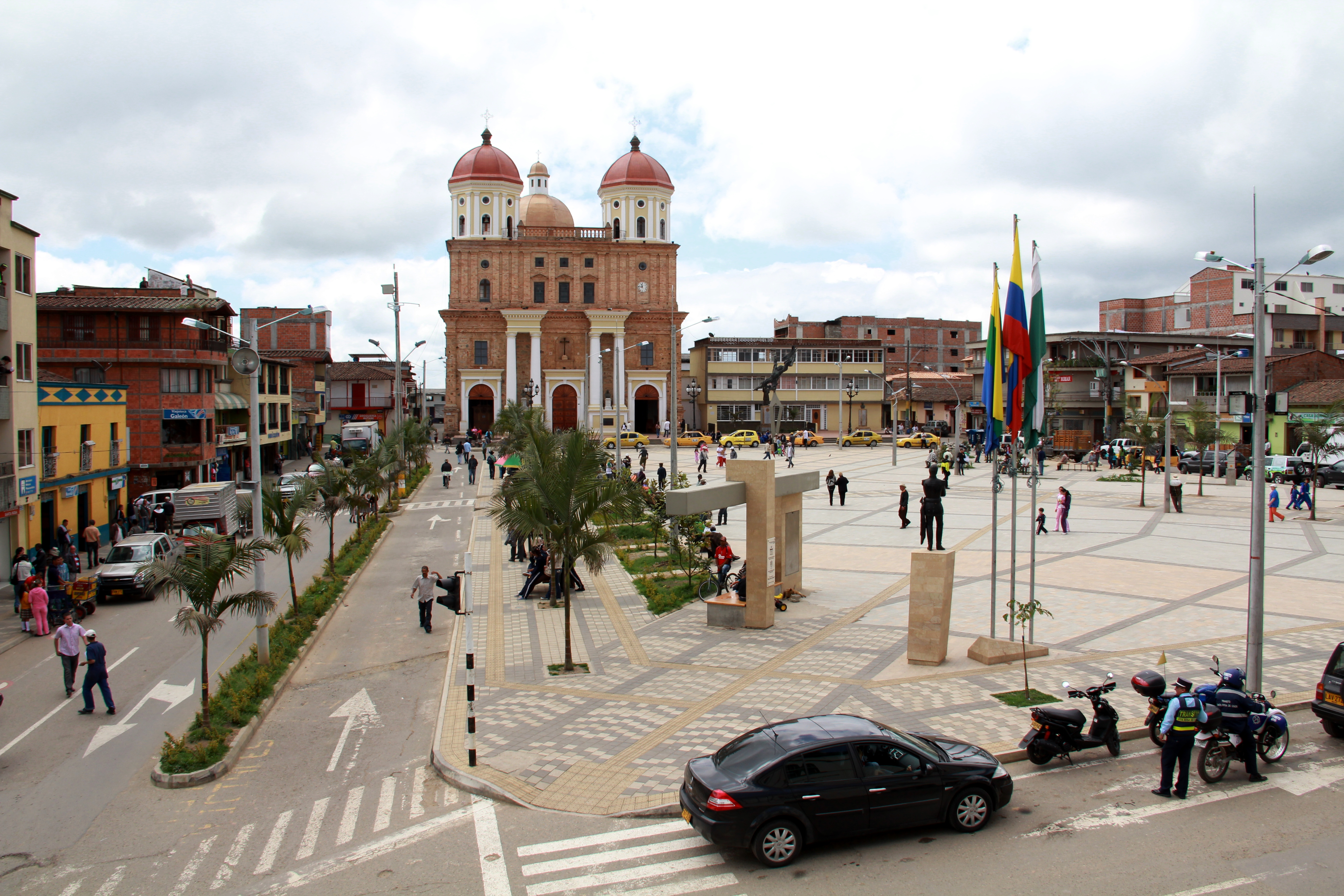
- Principal Park of Santa Rosa de Osos

- Flag Coat of arms

- Location of the municipality and city of Santa Rosa de Osos in the Antioquia Department of Colombia

- Location in Colombia
- Coordinates: 06°38′N 75°28′W
- Country: Colombia
- Department: Antioquia Department
- Subregion: Northern
- Founded: 1636

Government
  - Major: Carlos Alberto Posada Zapata

Area
  - Total: 812 km^{2} (314 sq mi)
- Elevation: 2,550 m (8,370 ft)

Population (2020 est.)
  - Total: 37,864
  - Density: 46.6/km^{2} (121/sq mi)
- SISBEN
- Time zone: UTC-5 (Colombia Standard Time)
- Website: http://www.santarosadeosos.gov.co

Santa Rosa de Osos is a middle city and municipality of Colombia located in the northern of the department of Antioquia. Bounded on the north with the municipalities of Yarumal and Angostura, on the east with Guadalupe and Carolina del Principe, on the south with the municipalities of Donmatías, San Pedro de los Milagros and Entrerríos, and on the west with Belmira and San José de la Montaña.

== History ==
=== Summary of the history of Santa Rosa de Osos ===
Before the arrival of the Spanish conquistadors, Indians Nutabes inhabiting the territory of Santa Rosa de Osos' , were fighters and agile. Working tissue cotton and exploited the gold. They had patriarchal social organization and believed in life after death, hence buried their dead with utensils, jewelry, food and clothing.

The northern region of Antioquia where today this municipality is located is a valley that in 1541, discovered the captain Spanish 'conquistador' Francisco Vallejo. The captain called it "Valley of the Bears" because there were there many of these animals. And by 1600 explorers and colonists found gold metal abundance in the region.

They came by the hundreds, led by another captain, Antonio Serrano y Espejo, whom he corresponded decree the foundation of a settlement on the site, in 1636, which was approved by His Majesty the King Philip IV of Spain.

In 1659 district stands in parish, from the bishop of Popayan Bishop Jacinto Vasco de Contreras y Velarde and changes the name to 'San Jacinto de los Osos' .

In 1792 was renamed 'Villa de Nuestra Señora de Chiquinquirá de los Osos' . In 1811 he acquired the name it has today, Santa Rosa de Osos' . The district was built as a municipality in 1814 ordered by the dictator Juan del Corral.

In 1917 the Diocese of Santa Rosa de Osos by order of Pope Benedicto XV was established, and investment by Yarce Betancur family, one of the most powerful families in those days and founders of one of the santarosan´s schools.

By 1924 was appointed the Bishop Miguel Angel Builes Gomez (missionary bishop of Colombia), who led their destinations for over forty years and founded four religious communities of great importance to the diocese and to the Colombian Catholic Church (the Sisters Teresitas Contemplativas, Teresitas Missionary Sisters, the Daughters of Our Lady of Mercy and the Xaverian Yarumal) Missionaries.

Currently, runs the destinies of the diocese the Bishop Jorge Alberto Ossa Soto.

Perhaps that is why this district acquired the nickname The City Religious' . Its history is full of events and characters that defined their Catholic vocation and, therefore, many of its attractions are related to religious tourism: the Cathedral, chapels and monuments that show the fervor that has characterized the santarosan people.

Santa Rosa is a great producer of milk and water for the metropolitan area of Aburrá Valley, which has enabled the construction of reservoirs as the Lakes Riogrande I and II .

=== Discovery and colonization of Valle De Los Osos ===
Marshal Jorge Robledo arrived in nearby Anzá in September 1541, from this place he sent several commissions, including one led by Captain Francisco Vallejo. This came with 40 men heading for the "Llanos de Ovejas" (Current district of San Pedro de los Milagros), the same San Pedro and Entrerríos. Then, later that same year he discovered a very cold temperature valley which he called "" Bear´s Valley "" by many who found.

This valley was inhabited by indigenous Nutabes that forced to Vallejo to leave the industry because of the hostilities shown by the native people. How these Indians did not appear to abundant wealth, "the Bear´s Valley" not made interesting for the ambitious Spanish conquerors. They left in oblivion this place for nearly a century.

The apparent poverty of the inhabitants, the Spaniards led to believe that the earth lacked precious minerals and the territory remained "virgin" and state neglect for a long time; although Don Andres De Valdivia and Don Gaspar De Rodas visit in the mid-sixteenth century the Valley of the Bears in the office of governor of the city of Santa Fe de Antioquia; territory to which it belonged at the time.

The first colonizations occurred at the hands of Pedro Gutierrez Colmenero (first mayor of the town of Medellin (1675)) and Don Antonio De Mesa, both natives of Jerez with Juan Nuño De Sotomayor discovered in 1645 the minerals of the valley and began operating in the streams: San Juan, La Trinidad, Orobajo, San Jose, San Antonio, Santa Ana and San Lorenzo. How also in the Guadalupe River and Los Martires stream.

While Gutierrez Colmenero toiled these mines, Fernando Toro Zapata, captain and official judge of the royal house of the city of Santa Fe de Antioquia, came to work the mines of the Caruquia stream.

=== The Rancheria ===
The first village was located south of the current city, on the site now occupied by the Arenales neighborhood, which was called to the eighteenth century La Rancheria; the ore of this place was owned by Captain Ignacio Velez De Rivero, like the chapel that existed there in 1740; where the Catholic tradition that the city would have evoked.

The rich mineral deposits that were found near the Bramadora, San Juan and San Antonio streams, just at the precise moment when the city of Antioquia gold was running out; attracted a lot of people from this and . Cáceres estimated that there were over 700 black people dedicated exclusively to tilling mining and more than 500 Spaniards or children of Spaniards in 1650, which in its most, were wealthy gentlemen and distinguished at the time.

- 'Destruction of the topography of the urban center of the current Santa Rosa:' In the early years of this settlement gold extraction was done with relative ease on the banks of streams and rivers, always they are characterized by having a calm path; however difficult tilling went slowly when there was need to undertake work on sections of the flow points where it was necessary to conduct the streams in canoes, through the trees or poles anchored to the floor. But often there were points where the waters could not climb, finding far apart or higher than the level thereof; this work forced to the people to carry on their backs the material to be transformed into the precious metal, where in rainy seasons had to fill large reservoirs of water to be used in the ore beneficiation process. Given the "technological" low knowledge of the time large tracts of land were excavated pits between 10 and 30 meters deep, depending on where it was located the mine site. How many times the material should be taken to other places for washing, gradually the land was changed as it progressed mining, to the point that nowadays huge scars within the city limits of the city are.

These processes were improved by then hearer Mon and Velarde who established laws for mining processes, accompanied by Monsieur Laneret or Moneret that the late seventeenth century began riding mills, a much more modern technology for the time.

=== Party of San Jacinto de los Osos ===
In the early eighteenth century began a large immigration from Medellin and Rionegro, the population increased so that by 1770 the name was changed to San Jacinto of the Bears. The first priest was Juan Bautista Dávila Knight, but on previously had lived in the village of Toro Jacinto, who came with Pedro Martin de Mora and Fray Pedro Simon; who wrote a story about the mines.

San Jacinto was so widening the eighteenth century there were five chapels outside the parish, among which stands out the Tierradentro. The parish chapel was dedicated in honor of Our Lady of Guadalupe. It was built to commemorate a miracle happened to the person of Pedro Bustamante, Spanish adventurer, who finding himself alone and harassed by the natives, he asked for help to the Virgin of Guadalupe, and come Juan Torres to his aid. However this native mauled Juan and Pedro escaped prodigiously appearing to his soldiers when they celebrated their funeral. The story brings what Dr. Julio Cesar Garcia as happened on the banks of Rio Grande, and this miracle that may give the name to Guadalupe River, although there is no hard historical facts that so affirm.

The village cemetery was located where today the Simon Bolivar Park, the main square of the town. For its construction helped Don Pedro Rodriguez de Zea in 1775, who was then serving as governor Site of Los Osos and who gave permission for the foundation of the current municipalities of Yarumal, Don Matías and Carolina del Principe.

- The customs of San Jacinto de los Osos were varied; the main celebrations were held in honor of the patron saint, Our Lady of Guadalupe and Our Lady of Chiquinquirá later. The arrival of the bishop of Popayán, the marriage of a rich or the coronation of a Spanish monarch was cause for celebration.

==== The Sombrerón ====
One of the hidden stories of the past of Santa Rosa de Osos, is the great discrimination that existed towards the colored races. Although Antioquia was characterized as one of the first areas where freedom was given to the slaves, it did not happen in the valley where today the municipality sits, in it all kinds of inhuman treatment were given to the community black by the Spaniards. Within this macabre piece of history, known for its cruelty the marriage of Don Juan Jose Salazar and María del Pardo, who had for pleasure favorite whipping the backs of their slaves and load them with chains. Their acts of cruelty also extended to animals, it is said that flayed the cows to apply salt and then put to death cattle in the midst of the most excruciating pain and howls.

Don Juan Jose Salazar who worked in La Trinidad mine, and the site currently occupied by the town of Gómez Plata, was characterized by wearing a huge hat, so he was nicknamed "The Sombrerón". At his death, all residents of the region agreed to apply eternal punishment and among in to simple people the belief that every night going through the town, after death, accompanied by his 2 large dogs. The belief became popular and later became a famous urban legend.

In Hoyorrico, santarosan district, it belongs to the historic mine and Chapel of La Trinidad, today remember this character in the name of one of its ancient streets.

=== Villa de Nuestra Señora del Rosario de Chiquinquirá de los Osos ===
In 1792 was governor of the province Francisco Baraya and La Campa, was erected in Villa, taking the name in English of Village of Our Lady of the Rosary of Chiquinquirá of the Bears, this fact corresponded to a new mining boom where characters recognized how Zulaibar, they replaced the old wealthy businessmen eighteenth century and established their forming a society of considerable economic and cultural wealth companies.

Much of these developments were brought about by a scientific growth of gold mining; Lode mines began to benefit from huge returns, how in Las Cruces and Las Animas streams.

Gold fell into a deep decline and this activity was quickly replaced by agriculture and livestock, creating better quality of life to its inhabitants, who were already living in an unhealthy environment caused by the exploitation of minerals. This respite was given to the land of Santa Rosa de Osos it has generdo to become a green city, which has remained so for more than 100 consecutive years with huge economic returns that put the municipality as a pantry of food and water for considered the most prosperous country in the region in terms of quality of life.

== General ==
- Foundation: On 18 August 1636
- Erection in municipality, 1814
- Founder: Spanish captain Antonio Serrano and Mirror
- Names: Eternal City, Pearl of the North, home to artists and scholars, Athens Cultural de Antioquia, Horizons Unlimited City, Vatican of Antioquia.

Its name is due to the memory of Santa Rosa de Lima and spectacled bears that abounded in the region.

== Infrastructure and transportation ==
=== Public space and urban planning ===
The municipality has a good population projection, which has driven a large urban development in recent times, where they have built whole neighborhoods and demolished old houses for the construction of buildings, the urban perimeter every day is more extensive and is planning to develop residential projects with all services, however parallel to the large private development, there are problems with the development of roads and public space, as most of its streets, avenues and parks are in disrepair, due to increased traffic automotive and low maintenance are given, a fact that also occurs in their districts, which do not even have a well-defined main park. Part of monuments and public furniture (benches, lamps, wastebaskets, etc.) are also affected apart from state abandonment by the action of vandals and disrespectful people streaking and destroy elements of public space.

Among its parks we are:

- Simon Bolivar Park.
- Pedro Justo Berrío Park.
- Marco Tobón Mejía-Lion Park.
- San Antonio Park.
- Cristo Rey.
- El Portal.

=== Transport and communications ===
Santa Rosa de Osos has a transport terminal; where they operate offices of various carriers and social services; maintains routes of constant public service with all its districts and the vast majority of their villages, their terminal leave regularly daily in addition to public service routes to municipalities in the region how San Jose de la Montaña, Entrerríos, San Pedro de los Milagros, Don Matías and Carolina del Príncipe and communicates with the city of Medellín, departmental capital through various public service routes that depart and arrive every few minutes.

=== Sport ===
Within the sports infrastructure, the city has 3 coliseums covered: The CIC of El Alto De La Mina, the Minor and Antonio Roldan Betancur, the municipal court of synthetic grass, the athletic complex with its athletic track, bicicross track, tennis court, and multisport covered more than 10 plates spread between neighborhoods, districts and villages, plus another lot of the same but to open air across the city. In the district Riogrande, the neighborhood Alto De La Mina and St. Thomas Aquinas Seminary there are soccer fields with good specifications.

=== Hospitality and tourism ===
Santa Rosa also has an excellent hotel infrastructure with high capacity and wide range of amenities for everyone. It has several museums, monuments and historical buildings that stand between its many churches.

=== Health ===
For coverage of 36,063 inhabitants, the municipality has a hospital primary care and three health institutions (IPS) in its urban center. SANTA ROSA PROSALCO. MEDICAL CENTER SANTA ROSA DE OSOS LTDA. CIMA HEADQUARTERS NORTH-San Juan de Dios Hospital. IPS NORTH SAN MARCOS DE LEON S.A.S

=== Communications ===
Santa Rosa has various companies how UNE-EDATEL that provide fixed telephony services and internet almost the entire population, the cell phone has excellent coverage in the city and rural areas, where companies that dominate this service are Claro, Movistar and Tigo.

Within the municipality actively operate two local radio stations: "Radio Más" and "Radio Mi Tierra" that are responsible for local information sharing within the city perimeter.

There is also a company own television in Santa Rosa de Osos, called CAPSOS whose programming grid, currently has more than 60 channels in all genres and themes, with the purpose to give viewers the choice of a wide offer that recreate their need for information, education and entertainment.

The contribution of partners can continuously enter services performed on a monthly basis and is subject to regulations.

The second projection line is through the various processes of information and communication, reflected in its own channel CAPSOS TV, the medium in which the collective imagination of the impacted community are reflected, cultural idiosyncrasies reflected and audiovisual memory is created the work of the santarrosana history.

"Through the contents of the channel is to generate spaces where the community has a voice and with input from our environment, as an alternative response to other media, are builders of their own development from the large communal dimension."

The most important in rural areas in the television service company is DIRECTV

=== Public Services ===
Santa Rosa de Osos has electricity service in practically all the municipality, provided by EPM. It has a good system of public lighting as much of the department, with great coverage.

The urban center on the other hand has a modern network of domestic gas, provided by EPM.

The water and sewer service, is provided by the company Sustainable Water Supply and Sewerage S.A (AASSA); having a Large coverage of drinking water in the urban center, which has a modern water purification plant with flow and uninterrupted service; due to its supply sources: The streams Chichi and Agua Mala (Tenche river source) falling by gravity from the Cerro San José; besides the stream Las Cruces feeding by pumping the water system generating an efficient aqueduct.

The sewage system has weaknesses, as some sectors do not have networks, providing their discharges directly to water sources, many places have community septic tanks; however urban streams have an unfortunate quality; highlighting the stream Agüitas Claras, passing northwest of the city and also has its birth in the same, between sectors of El Hoyo, the 33 and Villa Cruz. This stream has its natural source in the call stream Vinagrera and Caño El Hoyo, run by sectors of 33, El Hoyo, La Quinta, Boston, Tuberías, among others, and is the recipient of 55% of water waste of urban seat of Santa Rosa, without treatment, taking them with it to the Bramadora stream and this in turn the Grande river.

The remaining 45% goes to the basin of the Guadalupe River, where 12% falls to stream the Portal which flows into the stream San Jose in the south of the city without treatment and the other 33% directly down the Guadalupe River between Variant sectors, Barro Blanco, Los Chorros and El Turco.

Part of the water discharged to the Guadalupe River are conducted by a collector that leads to the plant wastewater treatment Turco, which operates under the acceptable levels of pollution required by the standard, but that still leaves visibly affected the river .

The districts and some rural villages each have their community service aqueduct, which is administered by the various community associations, basic sanitation is provided by the mayor, most septic tanks that meet quality standards.

Some farms make use of water concessions or craft deposits of the various streams for domestic consumption.

== Demography ==
The population was estimated to be 37,864 in 2020. In 2016, the total population was 36,103 people. The urban population comprised 19,012 people and 17,091 people were part of the rural population. In 2005, the literacy level was 91.3%.

=== Ethnography ===
According to the figures presented by DANE of the census 2005, the composition ethnographic of the municipality is:

- Mestizos & whites (84,0%)
- Afro-Colombians (16,0%)

== Political geography ==
The municipality owns 5 official districts, Aragon, Hoyorrico, San Pablo, Riogrande and San Isidro. For its part, the Town known as Caney is waiting for the update of the municipal PBOT that is currently developed and would legally give the title Of district. The municipality has more than 72 rural Villages.

- Communications: It is communicated by road with the municipalities of Yarumal, Angostura, Carolina, Donmatías, Entrerríos and San José de la Montaña.

Santa Rosa de Osos, is located mostly in the North highlands with an average height of 2550 meters above sea level, the areas that do not correspond to the high plateau are located on steep and deep slopes in the districts of San Pablo and San Isidro, where the height descends abruptly reaching hot and temperate thermal floors.

Its 812 square kilometers are divided into 805 square kilometers in rural area and 7 square kilometers in urban area. The territorial extension of Santa Rosa de Osos is slightly superior to the nation of Kiribati and more than 400 times the surface of Monaco.

== Climate ==
Climate data for Santa Rosa de Osos (Aragon), elevation 2,600 m (8,500 ft), (1981–2010)
Month	Jan	Feb	Mar	Apr	May	Jun	Jul	Aug	Sep	Oct	Nov	Dec	Year
Mean daily maximum °C (°F)	18.3 (64.9)	18.6 (65.5)	18.5 (65.3)	18.3 (64.9)	18.5 (65.3)	18.2 (64.8)	18.0 (64.4)	18.1 (64.6)	18.1 (64.6)	17.8 (64.0)	17.9 (64.2)	18.1 (64.6)	18.2 (64.8)
Daily mean °C (°F)	13.0 (55.4)	13.1 (55.6)	13.2 (55.8)	13.5 (56.3)	13.8 (56.8)	13.7 (56.7)	13.5 (56.3)	13.5 (56.3)	13.4 (56.1)	13.2 (55.8)	13.1 (55.6)	13.1 (55.6)	13.3 (55.9)
Mean daily minimum °C (°F)	6.2 (43.2)	6.4 (43.5)	7.2 (45.0)	8.5 (47.3)	9.1 (48.4)	8.4 (47.1)	7.8 (46.0)	7.7 (45.9)	8.0 (46.4)	8.0 (46.4)	7.7 (45.9)	6.9 (44.4)	7.7 (45.9)
Average precipitation mm (inches)	54.9 (2.16)	86.6 (3.41)	132.2 (5.20)	193.4 (7.61)	246.6 (9.71)	165.8 (6.53)	168.0 (6.61)	157.1 (6.19)	197.9 (7.79)	234.5 (9.23)	188.6 (7.43)	107.3 (4.22)	1,932.9 (76.10)
Average precipitation days (≥ 1.0 mm)	9	11	15	20	23	20	20	20	21	24	20	14	216
Average relative humidity (%)	86	87	87	87	87	86	85	85	86	87	88	87	87
Mean monthly sunshine hours	158.1	138.3	124.0	102.0	117.8	153.0	186.0	176.7	132.0	111.6	114.0	136.4	1,649.9
Mean daily sunshine hours	5.1	4.9	4.0	3.4	3.8	5.1	6.0	5.7	4.4	3.6	3.8	4.4	4.5
Source: Instituto de Hidrologia Meteorologia y Estudios Ambientales
