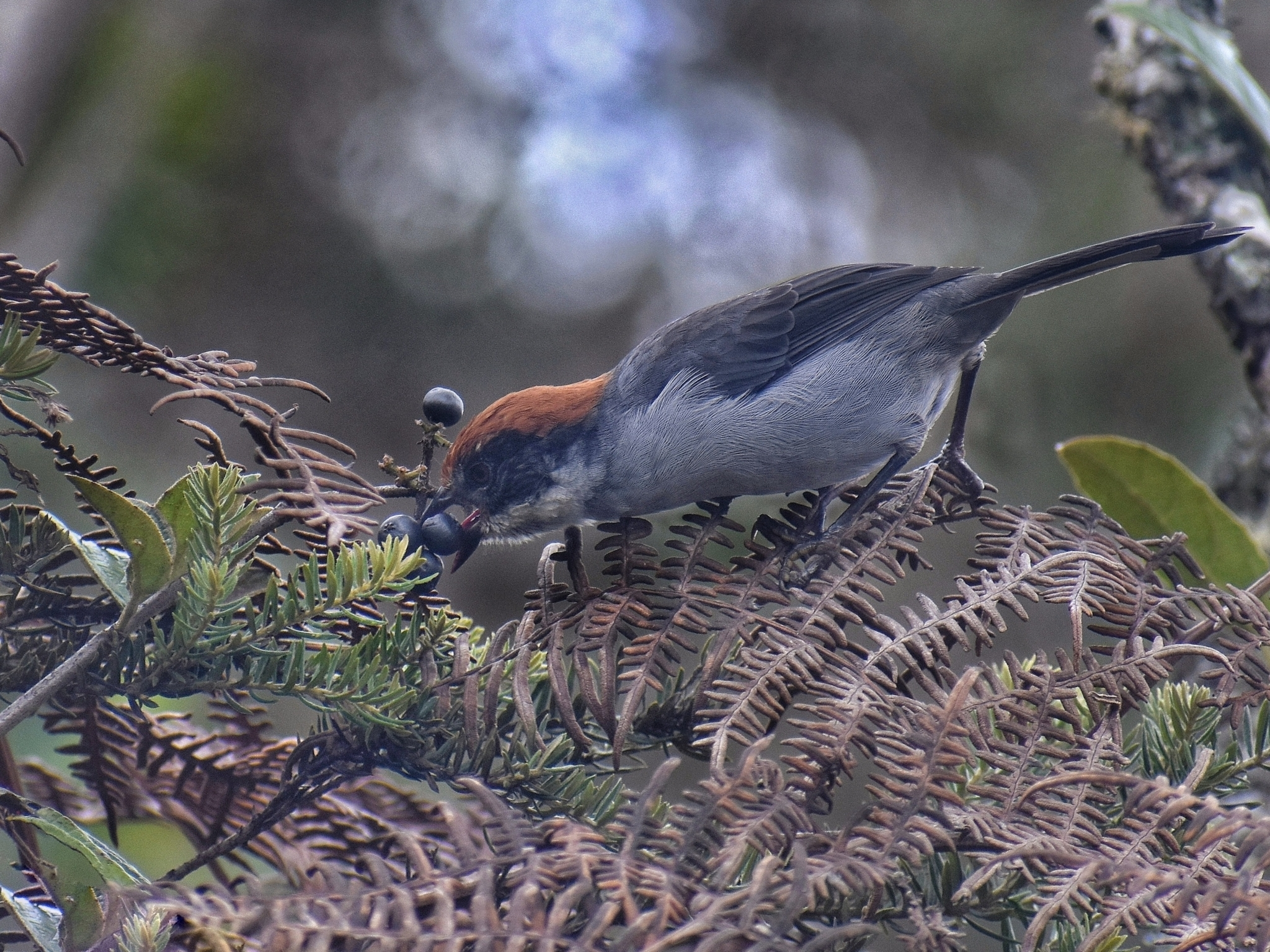

Conservation status
- Critically Endangered (IUCN 3.1)

Scientific classification
- Kingdom: Animalia
- Phylum: Chordata
- Class: Aves
- Order: Passeriformes
- Family: Passerellidae
- Genus: Atlapetes
- Species: A. blancae

Binomial name
- Atlapetes blancae Donegan, 2007

= Antioquia brushfinch =

Species of bird endemic to Colombia

The Antioquia brushfinch (Atlapetes blancae) is a poorly known species of bird from Colombia. It was scientifically described in 2007 on basis of three museum specimens from Antioquia, Colombia, which were previously mislabelled as slaty brushfinches (Atlapetus schistaceus). The specific epithet blancae refers to the whitish underparts of the new species, while also commemorating the Colombian lepidopterologist Blanca Huertas, the wife of ornithologist Thomas M. Donegan (who described the species). All three museum skins were collected in the 20th century, but only one label has a date, which is given as 1971. Despite recent research attempts, much of what is known of the species remains preliminary.

== Rediscovery ==
In January 2018, a Colombian resident of San Pedro de los Milagros noticed this bird on his way to Sunday mass. After multiple failed attempts, subsequent fieldwork in Antioquia managed to find the species again. The bird had been previously overlooked despite living relatively close to the city of Medellín, which is home to 3.7 million people. Since then, numerous studies have found the bird within and around several nearby municipalities. However, its population size and distribution were found to be small. More initiatives to explore the region are still necessary to determine if more populations exist, and what territory should be protected.

== Taxonomy ==
Since its rediscovery, its status as a distinct species has been approved by the South American Classification Committee. It was placed in the genus Atlapetes, which belongs to the Passerellidae family. The genus is diverse, and rooted in Central and South America, with many species being found in the Andes. While phylogenies of the genus exist, they were completed before the Antioquia brushfinch was rediscovered in the wild and hence do not include it. However, initial genetic testing suggests that it may be most closely related to the slaty brushfinch (Atlapetes schistaceus).

== Description ==
A. blancae is as a large finch with grey plumage; dark grey feathers on its back and tail, with whitish grey on its breast, stomach and throat. It has a reddish-brown crown, a black mask and a narrow pale line along the side of its face called a moustachial stripe. The bird has nine primaries, with some individuals also displaying a small white patch on their wing called a speculum. Individuals have been reported to weigh an average of 27.91 g (0.98 oz), have a wing length around 71.75 mm (2.82 in), and a tail length of 77.75 mm (3.06 in). Males have whiter chests and throats, more reddish crowns, and are generally larger than females. Specifically, males have larger wings and tails, as well as longer beaks. Compared to adults, juveniles have a browner back and underside, with a yellowish lower bill, a browner crown, and a greyer mask. They also have a larger, more lightly colored gape and are smaller than adults due to their shorter tail. The immature stage is a transitional period between juvenility and adulthood, and typically bears a more opaque version of the adult plumage.

== Habitat and Distribution ==
A. blancae is endemic to the Altiplano de Santa Rosa de Osos, a high elevation plateau in the department of Antioquia, Colombia. The bird has been found at altitudes of roughly 2400 to 2900 meters above sea level. Observation records suggest that the population is split into two disconnected areas; one group is in the north of the plateau, spanning the municipalities of Angostura, Santa Rosa de Osos, Belmira and Yarumal, while a smaller southern cluster lives in Bello and San Pedro de los Milagros.

The species mainly inhabits disturbed or regenerating habitats consisting of low-growing trees, native shrubs, weedy grasses, and overgrown pasture-shrubland mixes. These habitats are often found on acidic, rocky soil, exposed to intense sunlight and fluctuating winds and temperature, as well as small wetland areas that form in depressions of the landscape. The birds also prefer when the shrubs and herbaceous vegetation are present but incompletely cover the terrain (25%-75% groundcover). The species is estimated to have a possible range of roughly 521 km^{2} to 789 km^{2}. However, only a third of this area is made of suitable habitat, with as little as roughly 14 to 19 km^{2} representing unbroken and continuous territory. Indeed, the landscape is highly fragmented, mostly due to agricultural and pasture development. For example, in San Pedro de los Milagros, 73% of the land is already converted to grazing spaces.

== Behaviour ==
=== Vocalizations ===
Researchers have described a variety of call notes and song phrases of the Antioquia brushfinch, allowing them to identify two types of calls and one song.

- The first call was described as a soft (tz…tz) that lasted around 0.05 seconds.
- The second call was sharper (tzzzz…tzzzz) and lasted around 0.2 seconds.
- The song begins with introductory notes made from call A followed by call B, followed by a fast trill (trzzz…), and then a variable number of final ascending and descending (…zcheui zcheui zcheui…) notes. It lasts around 3.7 seconds and had two variations The first variation has no final notes (ends with the trill), lasting roughly 1.7 seconds. The second variation replaces the introductory notes with many long notes similar to call B, adds more trills, and has fewer final notes. It lasts roughly two seconds.

While the purposes of these songs and calls are yet to be understood, other instances of vocal displays have been associated with specific behaviours. Notably, males are believed to emit many different territorial calls, which often include the mimicry of other birds. Additionally, breeding pairs have been heard vocalizing to cue bouts of foraging behaviour, where the female will break from incubating for a short period of time. Vocal activity occurs most often in the morning.

=== Diet ===
The Antioquia brushfinch is an omnivore that feeds on a variety of fruits, seeds, nectar and insects. The birds were observed foraging for invertebrates by stripping both larval and adult insects off plants, as well as pecking in wood to find them. Fruits and seeds were collected from plants such as Berberis medellinensis, Weinmannia pubescens and Vaccinium meridionale. When feeding on nectar, the birds have been observed to tear the flowers off for better access to the nutrients.

=== Reproduction ===
Reproductive activity in A. blancae is at its highest in May, though breeding season generally spans from late February to early August. The timing of reproduction coincides with greater day length, and increased precipitation. There are two rainy seasons per year in the region, but only the first triggers reproductive behaviour. Overall, these seasonal patterns are similar to most Atlapetes species.

Observations of nesting are limited, but the species has been documented to build low-to-the-ground, cup-shaped nests using dry plant material. The observed nest was 10 cm wide, 9.5 cm long, 8 cm high, 5 cm deep, and contained two eggs that had white and reddish-brown spots concentrated towards the base. Overall, these characteristics are typical of Atlapetes species.

The male and female appear to have distinct breeding roles, where males guard the nest, emitting territorial calls and the female incubates the eggs. This incubation was reported to last twenty days, which is relatively long compared to other members of the genus.

== Conservation ==
The species is considered critically endangered by the IUCN Red List, with only 405 individuals living in a small, highly fragmented area of 322 hectares. The bird's decline is primarily attributed to habitat loss from agriculture and pastureland expansion. These land-use changes also benefit Shiny Cowbirds, which are known to be brood parasites for other brushfinches. Additionally, the population is distributed in two isolated patches, further increasing the risk of inbreeding. In addition, protected areas in the region have little to no overlap with A. blancae’s range, and do not contain its preferred habitats. However, despite their low population size, recent studies indicate a healthy sex ratio, with a 45% chance of being a male.

Since its rediscovery, researchers have highlighted key targets for conservation action. Specifically, increasing protection for low-growing shrubs and thickets, which are not usually considered important for conservation. Farming techniques should also be remodeled to reduce their effects on the bird, meaning community members and farmers should be included in preservation initiatives. Pastures should incorporate wildlife corridors of low-growing trees and shrubs to increase the connectivity of the brushfinch’s habitat. Additionally, fences could be used to envelope small wetland areas within pastures, to avoid trampling and grazing by livestock.

Currently, two sites in the Santa de Osos municipality and one in the San Pedro de los Milagros municipality are recognized as critical habitats. Both support high A. blancae density and suitable vegetation, making them high priority for conservation. Additionally, researchers have proposed surveys in two strips of land that have good connectivity and ideal habitat conditions. The first is between San Rosa de Osas and Angostura, while the second is at the edge of Bello and San Pedro de los Milagros, and could both contain undiscovered populations.
