= Restrepia tsubotae =

Conservation status
- CITES Appendix II

Scientific classification
- Kingdom: Plantae
- Clade: Tracheophytes
- Clade: Angiosperms
- Clade: Monocots
- Order: Asparagales
- Family: Orchidaceae
- Subfamily: Epidendroideae
- Genus: Restrepia
- Species: R. tsubotae

Binomial name
- Restrepia tsubotae Luer & R.Escobar

Species of flowering plant

Restrepia tsubotae is a species of flowering plant in the family Orchidaceae. It is an epiphyte native to Colombia.

The species was described in 1996, and is listed in Appendix II of CITES.

== Taxonomy ==
Restrepia tsubotae was described by Carlyle A. Luer and Rodrigo Escobar in 1996.

The type material was collected in 1991, in Briceño, Antioquia, Colombia. It was found at an elevation of 600 metres (2,000 ft).

== Distribution ==
Restrepia tsubotae is native to the wet tropical biome of Colombia's Antioquia Department.

== Conservation ==
Restrepia tsubotae is listed in Appendix II of CITES. There are no suspensions or quotas in place for the species.
