= Valdivia, Antioquia =

- Municipality and town
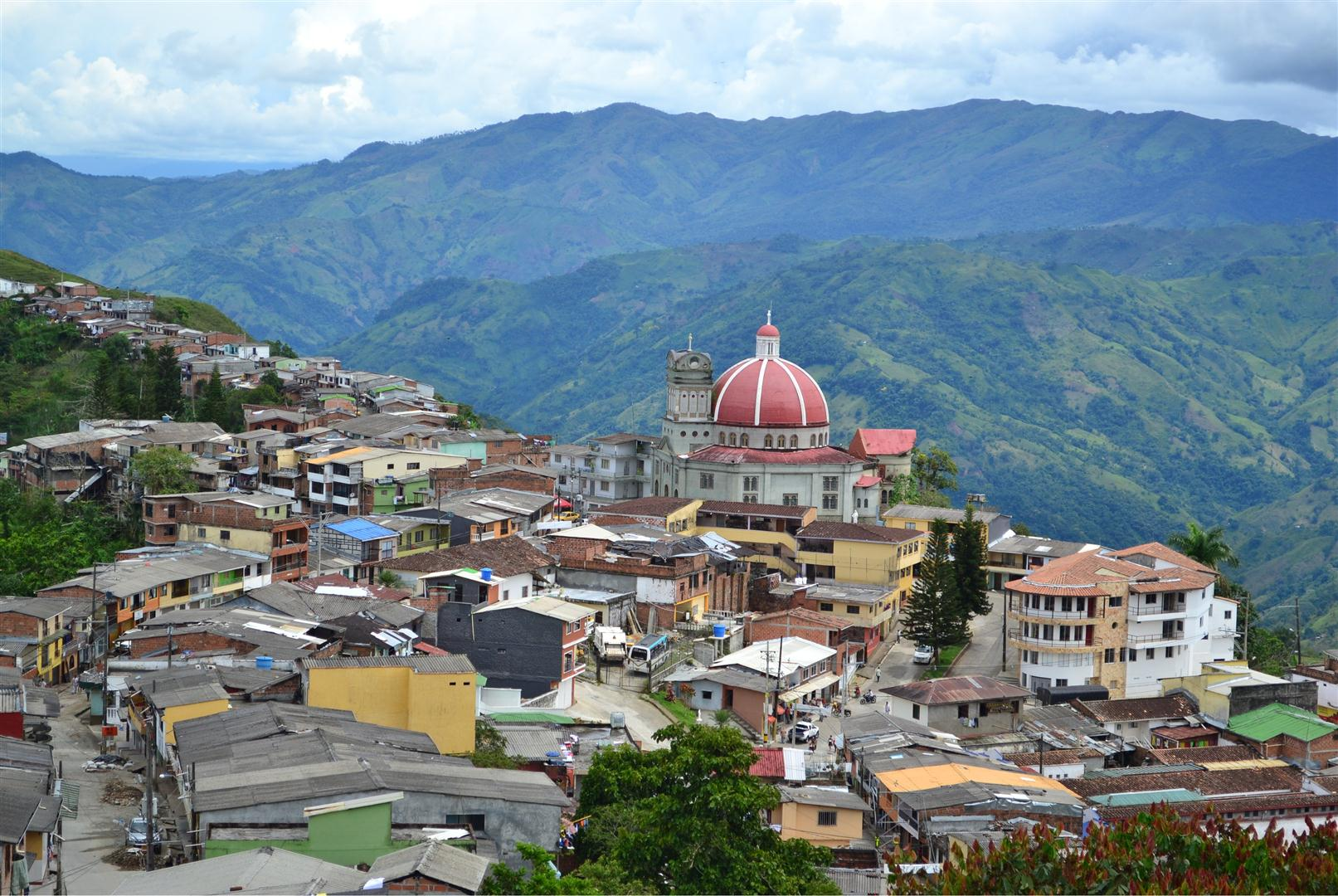
- Valdivia, Antioquia

- Flag

- Location of the municipality and town of Valdivia, Antioquia in the Antioquia Department of Colombia

- Location in Colombia
- Coordinates: 7°17′20.4″N 75°23′52.8″W
- Country: Colombia
- Department: Antioquia Department
- Subregion: Northern
- Elevation: 1,100 m (3,600 ft)

Population (Census 2018)
  - Total: 11,511
- Time zone: UTC-5 (Colombia Standard Time)

Valdivia is a town and municipality in Antioquia Department, Colombia. Part of the subregion of Northern Antioquia, its population was 11,511 at the 2018 census.

== History ==
Valdivia was inhabited by the Nutabes people upon the arrival of the Spanish colonists. In 1849 Spanish Pedro Vasquez acquired the land and cultivated the area, bringing labourers from other regions of Antioquia, that eventually began exploring and exploiting other land nearby. On February 5, 1892, became a corregimiento part of the municipality of Yarumal. Braulio Berrio was named its first Corregidor. In 1912 the Assembly of Antioquia segregated Valdivia from Yarumal assigned more land to its territory from other municipalities and made it a municipality.

== Climate ==
Valdivia has an elevation moderated tropical rainforest climate (Af). It has very heavy rainfall year-round.

Climate data for Valdivia (Sta Isabel), elevation 1,200 m (3,900 ft), (1981–2010)
Month	Jan	Feb	Mar	Apr	May	Jun	Jul	Aug	Sep	Oct	Nov	Dec	Year
Mean daily maximum °C (°F)	24.3 (75.7)	24.7 (76.5)	25.1 (77.2)	25.3 (77.5)	25.6 (78.1)	25.6 (78.1)	25.7 (78.3)	25.7 (78.3)	25.5 (77.9)	25.2 (77.4)	24.8 (76.6)	24.3 (75.7)	25.2 (77.4)
Daily mean °C (°F)	21.2 (70.2)	21.4 (70.5)	21.7 (71.1)	21.8 (71.2)	22.0 (71.6)	22.0 (71.6)	21.9 (71.4)	22.0 (71.6)	21.7 (71.1)	21.5 (70.7)	21.4 (70.5)	21.2 (70.2)	21.6 (70.9)
Mean daily minimum °C (°F)	18.6 (65.5)	18.6 (65.5)	18.8 (65.8)	19.1 (66.4)	19.2 (66.6)	19.1 (66.4)	18.8 (65.8)	18.8 (65.8)	18.8 (65.8)	18.8 (65.8)	19.0 (66.2)	18.9 (66.0)	18.9 (66.0)
Average precipitation mm (inches)	332.8 (13.10)	414.7 (16.33)	410.7 (16.17)	356.2 (14.02)	392.6 (15.46)	408.2 (16.07)	346.0 (13.62)	405.1 (15.95)	497.1 (19.57)	399.1 (15.71)	466.3 (18.36)	436.9 (17.20)	4,865.6 (191.56)
Average precipitation days (≥ 1.0 mm)	15	15	17	22	26	25	26	25	25	27	24	18	262
Average relative humidity (%)	89	89	89	90	90	90	89	89	89	90	91	90	90
Mean monthly sunshine hours	124.0	101.6	93.0	84.0	102.3	114.0	145.7	139.5	114.0	105.4	120.0	120.9	1,364.4
Mean daily sunshine hours	4.0	3.6	3.0	2.8	3.3	3.8	4.7	4.5	3.8	3.4	4.0	3.9	3.7
Source: Instituto de Hidrologia Meteorologia y Estudios Ambientales
