= Toledo, Antioquia =

- Municipality and town
- Flag Coat of arms

- Location of the municipality and town of Toledo, Antioquia in the Antioquia Department of Colombia

- Location in Colombia
- Coordinates: 7°0′37″N 75°42′6″W
- Country: Colombia
- Department: Antioquia Department
- Subregion: Northern
- Elevation: 1,850 m (6,070 ft)
- Time zone: UTC-5 (Colombia Standard Time)

Toledo is a town and municipality in Antioquia Department, Colombia. Part of the subregion of Northern Antioquia, it lies at an altitude of 1,850 m (6,070 ft).
