= Flag of Antioquia Department =

Antioquia Department
- Use: Civil and state flag
- Proportion: 2:3
- Adopted: December 10, 1962
- Design: A horizontal bicolour of white and green.

The Flag of the Department of Antioquia is the flag symbol of the Colombian Department of Antioquia.

The flag originated in the University of Antioquia but it was not officially established as symbol of Antioquia until 1962 by ordinance of the Government of Antioquia Department.

The flag has two equal horizontal stripes. The top white stripe symbolizes purity, integrity, obedience, eloquence and triumph. The lower green stripe is a symbol of mountains, hope, wealth, faith, service and respect.
