= Ituango =

- Municipality and town
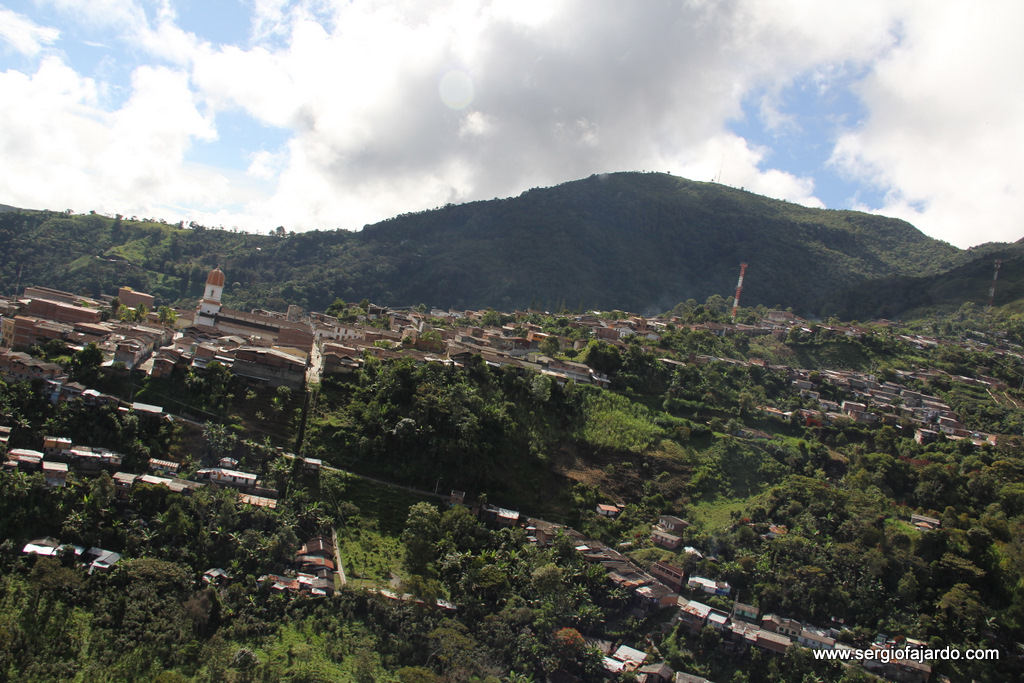

- Flag Coat of arms

- Location of the municipality and town of Ituango in the Antioquia Department of Colombia

- Location in Colombia
- Coordinates: 7°10′18″N 75°45′51″W
- Country: Colombia
- Department: Antioquia Department
- Subregion: Northern
- Elevation: 1,550 m (5,090 ft)

Population (Census 2018)
  - Total: 23,784
- Time zone: UTC-5 (Colombia Standard Time)

Ituango is a town and municipality in the Colombian department of Antioquia. It is part of the subregion of Northern Antioquia. The population was 23,784 at the 2018 census.

The mayor, since 2024, is Javier Parias Posso.
