= Northern Antioquia =

Location of the Northern Antioquia region within the Antioquia Department.

Northern Antioquia is a subregion in the Colombian Department of Antioquia. The region is made up of 17 municipalities.

== Municipalities ==
- Angostura
- Belmira
- Briceño
- Campamento
- Carolina del Príncipe
- Don Matías
- Entrerríos
- Gómez Plata
- Guadalupe
- Ituango
- San Andrés
- San José de la Montaña
- San Pedro
- Santa Rosa de Osos
- Toledo
- Valdivia
- Yarumal
