= Campamento, Antioquia =

- Municipality and town
- Flag Coat of arms

- Location of the municipality and town of Campamento, Antioquia in the Antioquia Department of Colombia

- Location in Colombia
- Coordinates: 7°6′38″N 75°33′4″W
- Country: Colombia
- Department: Antioquia Department
- Subregion: Northern

Government
  - Mayor: Jorge Ivan Duran

Area
  - Municipality and town: 200 km^{2} (77 sq mi)
  - Urban: 0.2 km^{2} (0.077 sq mi)
- Elevation: 1,700 m (5,600 ft)

Population
  - Municipality and town: 9,091
  - Urban: 2,875
- Time zone: UTC-5 (Colombia Standard Time)
- Website: http://www.campamento-antioquia.gov.co

Campamento is a town and municipality in the Colombian department of Antioquia. Part of the subregion of Northern Antioquia, it lies at an altitude of 1,700 m (5,600 ft) above sea level. It is a little town, in the middle of the Andes.It borders on the north with the municipalities of Yarumal and Anorí, on the east with Anorí, on the south with the municipality of Angostura, and on the west with Yarumal.

Campamento is known as Cradle of Independence of Antioquia. The name Campamento surely comes from the fact that the area was used as a camp by muleteers traveling between the north and northeast region of Antioquia

== History ==
In pre-Hispanic times the area was inhabited by the natives of the Nechí and Ituango tribes. In the middle of the 17th century, the north zone of the department began to be populated thanks to its gold wealth. The locality was not populated itself until 1827, the year in which the first settlers arrived from Yarumal.

The Campamentño territory was elevated to the category of Parish of the Municipality of Yarumal in 1830. Five years later the locality itself was raised to the status of a municipality by the then governor of Antioquia, Don Juan de Dios Aranzazu, thus separating the locality of the municipality of Yarumal.

In 1780 there was a lawsuit between Messrs. Joaquin Barrientos, Plácido Misas and Mr. Antonio De La Quintana who claimed rights over these lands, resolved in 1781 in favor of Messrs Barrientos and Misas, who were thenceforth the owners of Camp grounds and Yarumal. Campamento, which was a parish of Yarumal (decreed 23 April 1835, being governor of Antioquia Aranzazu), took that name in the wake of the Battle of White Chorros, 12 February 1820, in which General Jose Maria Cordova defeated General Francisco Warletta and finished with the last realistic redoubt in Antioquia. The first settlers of Campamento were people of Yarumal who arrived at the site in 1827 by insinuation of the priest of that population, gift Jose Antonio Palace Isaza, who is considered to be the founder. In 1830 the parish was created by request of the city council of Santa Rosa de Osos and in 1835 the population was given the status of municipality by decree of the Governor Juan de Dios Aranzazu. The first church in the municipality was destroyed by a fire and construction of the current one was completed in the middle of the 20th century (probably in 1954). The first telegraphic line between Yarumal and Campamento was established in 1897. Electric light reached the municipality in 1939. In 1943 the road that connects Yarumal with Campamento was brought into service.
