= Walter Noriega =

Colombian footballer (born 1979)

Personal information
- Full name: Walter Noriega
- Date of birth: March 22, 1979 (age 47)
- Place of birth: Chigorodó, Antioquia, Colombia
- Height: 1.90 m (6 ft 3 in)
- Position: Goalkeeper

Senior career*
Years	Team	Apps	(Gls)
2006–2009	Boyacá Chicó	106	(0)
2010–2012	Cienciano	72	(0)
2012	→ Real Cartagena (loan)	8	(0)
2013	Unión Magdalena	26	(0)
- * Club domestic league appearances and goals as of June 21, 2022

Walter Noriega (born 22 Match 1979) is a former Colombian football goalkeeper who last played for Unión Magdalena.

Noriega previously played for Boyacá Chicó F.C. in the Copa Mustang.

== Career statistics ==
=== Club ===
Club	Season	League			National Cup		Continental		Other		Total	
Club	Season	Division	Apps	Goals	Apps	Goals	Apps	Goals	Apps	Goals	Apps	Goals
Boyacá Chicó F.C.	2006-09	Categoría Primera A	106	0	0	0	1	0	—		107	0
Boyacá Chicó F.C.	Total		106	0	0	0	—		—		107	0
Cienciano	2010	Primera División	29	0	0	0	—		—		29	0
Cienciano	2011	Primera División	43	0	0	0	—		—		43	0
Cienciano	Total		72	0	0	0	0	0	0	0	72	0
Real Cartagena (loan)	2012	Categoría Primera A	8	0	4	0	—		—		12	0
Real Cartagena (loan)	Total		8	0	4	0	—		—		12	0
Unión Magdalena	2013	Categoría Primera B	29	0	6	0	—		—		35	0
Career total			215	0	10	0	1	0	0	0	226	0

== See also ==
- Football in Colombia
- List of football clubs in Colombia
