= Briceño, Antioquia =

Briceño
- Municipality and town
- Flag Coat of arms

- Location of the municipality and town of Briceño in the Antioquia Department of Colombia

- Location in Colombia
- Coordinates: 7°06′39″N 75°33′05″W
- Country: Colombia
- Department: Antioquia Department
- Subregion: Northern

Area
  - Total: 401 km^{2} (155 sq mi)
- Elevation: 1,200 m (3,900 ft)
- Time zone: UTC-5 (Colombia Standard Time)

Briceño is a town and municipality in Antioquia Department, Colombia. Part of the subregion of Northern Antioquia, it lies at an altitude of 1,200 m (3,900 ft) above sea level.

== Climate ==
Briceño has a relatively cool tropical rainforest climate (Af) due to altitude. It has very heavy rainfall year round.

Climate data for Briceño
| Month | Jan | Feb | Mar | Apr | May | Jun | Jul | Aug | Sep | Oct | Nov | Dec | Year |
|---|---|---|---|---|---|---|---|---|---|---|---|---|---|
| Mean daily maximum °C (°F) | 26.6 (79.9) | 27.2 (81.0) | 27.6 (81.7) | 27.4 (81.3) | 26.7 (80.1) | 26.6 (79.9) | 27.0 (80.6) | 26.7 (80.1) | 26.2 (79.2) | 25.8 (78.4) | 25.5 (77.9) | 26.7 (80.1) | 26.7 (80.0) |
| Daily mean °C (°F) | 21.2 (70.2) | 21.7 (71.1) | 22.2 (72.0) | 22.2 (72.0) | 21.8 (71.2) | 21.6 (70.9) | 21.8 (71.2) | 21.5 (70.7) | 21.2 (70.2) | 21.1 (70.0) | 20.9 (69.6) | 21.0 (69.8) | 21.5 (70.7) |
| Mean daily minimum °C (°F) | 15.9 (60.6) | 16.2 (61.2) | 16.8 (62.2) | 17.0 (62.6) | 17.0 (62.6) | 16.7 (62.1) | 16.6 (61.9) | 16.4 (61.5) | 16.3 (61.3) | 16.4 (61.5) | 16.4 (61.5) | 15.3 (59.5) | 16.4 (61.5) |
| Average rainfall mm (inches) | 162.3 (6.39) | 245.4 (9.66) | 297.1 (11.70) | 576.5 (22.70) | 776.8 (30.58) | 732.9 (28.85) | 791.8 (31.17) | 752.7 (29.63) | 684.4 (26.94) | 723.4 (28.48) | 511.5 (20.14) | 273.9 (10.78) | 6,528.7 (257.02) |
| Average rainy days | 12 | 14 | 16 | 23 | 26 | 24 | 25 | 24 | 24 | 25 | 22 | 16 | 251 |
Source 1:
Source 2:
