= San Andrés de Cuerquia =

San Andrés, Antioquia Cuerqueño
- Municipality and town
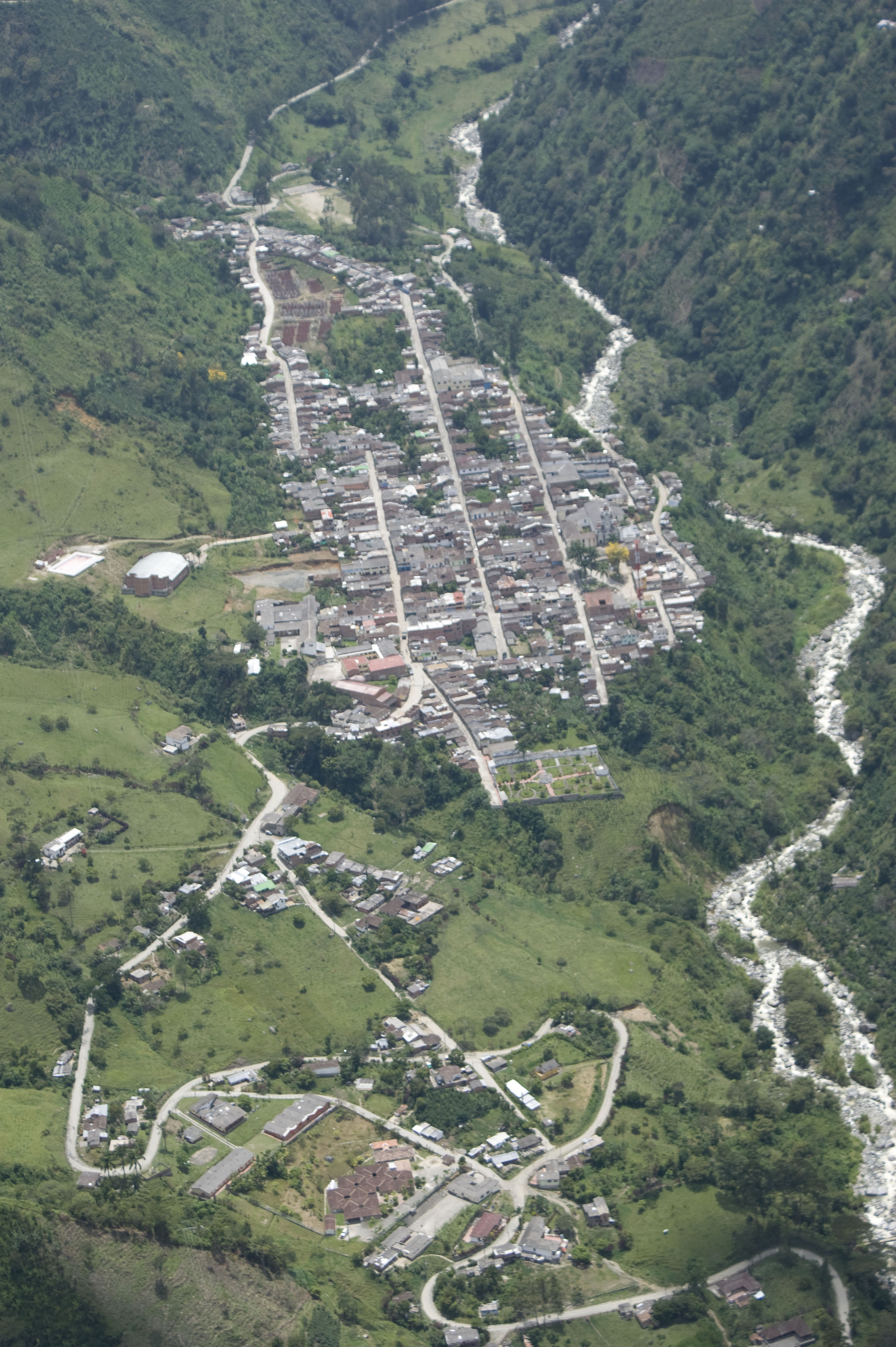

- Flag Coat of arms

- Location of the municipality and town of San Andrés, Antioquia in the Antioquia Department of Colombia

- Location in Colombia
- Coordinates: 06°54′52″N 75°40′33″W
- Country: Colombia
- Department: Antioquia Department
- Subregion: Northern
- Time zone: UTC-5 (Colombia Standard Time)

San Andrés is a town and municipality in Antioquia Department, Colombia. It is part of the sub-region of Northern Antioquia.

== History ==
In the days of its foundation, next to the San Andrés river, this district was inhabited by Nutabes Indians and was governed by the Cacique Guarcama, widely mentioned in the chronicles of the time as a warrior also remembered for his fierceness and business ability.

The conquering adventures of the Spanish captain Andrés de Valdivia had impelled him to subjugate this zone in the north of Antioquia, and he had this territory under the control of his troops in the year 1574. Valdivia entered into combat with the cacique Guarcama and Valdivia lost his life because of it. His head was displayed on logs for a long time, next to the heads of several of his soldiers. In response the then Governor of the Province sent to the region an enormous army that ended up massacring the tribe of Guarcama showing the technological superiority of the Iberians.

Upon the arrival of the Spaniards, these lands were occupied by high-ranking caciques between the Nutabes and Tahamis.

At the time, the region was visited by Captain Don Andrés de Valdivia, the first governor of the province of Antioquia, who organized an expedition to the middle course of the Cauca River. The Spanish captain Don Bartolomé Sánchez Torreblanca indisposed the natives against the Spanish ruler, who was killed by the cacique Quimé in the year of 1576. The place where the events took place is now called La Matanza.

A few years after the death of Valdivia, Don Gaspar de Rodas applied a fierce revenge on the part of the Spanish kingdom, and all the natives, especially those of the Valley of Guarcama, were exterminated without mercy.

The governor of the province of Popayán adjudged these lands to the Spanish officer Don Francisco Lopez de Rúa in the year 1582, who founded a town in the Guarcama Valley where Valdivia was killed, which he named San Andrés de Cauca in honor of the murdered captain and the nearby Cauca river.

On January 25, 1793 there was a fire that had burned the whole town, diminishing the importance it once had being on the obligatory passage to Mompóx and the Atlantic coast. In this place the parish of San Andrés was created, in the year of 1761. In the year of 1822 it was formed into a municipality.

On June 13, 1853, it was transferred from the Guarcama Valley to the current site. At the time of the beginning, it was named Cuerquia, for honoring the name of the "Cuerquías" tribes, natives of the narrow slope of the San Andrés River. However, the story tells that the first name at the time of the transfer was called Calcedonia in honor of the wise Caldas. Then in 1860, Pabón was named in honor of the governor who gave the transfer ordinance. The provincial chamber of Antioquia gave the ordinance 11, November 14, 1854, in which they assigned the name as Pabón and not Cuerquia, but shortly afterwards, in honor of its history, it changed definitively back to San Andrés de Cuerquia.

Baldomero Jaramillo Ruiz and Pedro José Jaramillo Romero, of Rionegro, sponsored by Pbro. Domingo Antonio Angarita Mendoza, were the founders of this new town in the year 1853, changing its name and place. In 1856, it was given the category of Municipality. At the beginning of the last century, San Andrés de Cuerquia had recovered much of its former importance, thanks to the fertility of its hillsides which are very conducive to all types of crops.

== General ==
- Foundation: June 13, 1761
- Erection in municipality: 1856
- Founders: Presbítero Domingo Antonio Angarita and the Lords Baldomero and Pedro José Jaramillo
- Appellation: Cofrecito enclosed between mountains.

It has also had the names of Chalcedony, San Andrés del Cauca, Pabón and Cuerquia .

It has a temperate climate and produces coffee. Points of interest include the temple of Santo Cristo as well as streams, rivers, and waterfalls.

== Demography ==
- Total Population: 6,226 inhabitants (2015).
- Urban Population: 2 521
- Rural Population: 3 705

To the municipality belong the villages of Montañadentro, San Miguel, La Chorrera, Cordillera, El Roble, Aguacatal, Alto Seco, Cañaduzales, El Cántaro, Santa Gertrudis, Travesías, Loma Grande, San Antonio, Las Cruces, Cruces Arriba, La Ciénaga, La Lejía, Atezal, El Vergel, Media Loma, Loma del Indio, El Filo, Montebello, San Julián, Santa Gertrudis and Travesías among others.

According to the corporation Vistas, of Medellín, "it is a municipality with a temperate climate enclosed between the green mountains of the North of Antioquia, coffee maker par excellence, its main attractions are the ravines, rivers and waterfalls that form beautiful landscapes and that are visited by tourists, because they make possible trips between the nature of the region ".
