= Guadalupe, Antioquia =

- Municipality and town
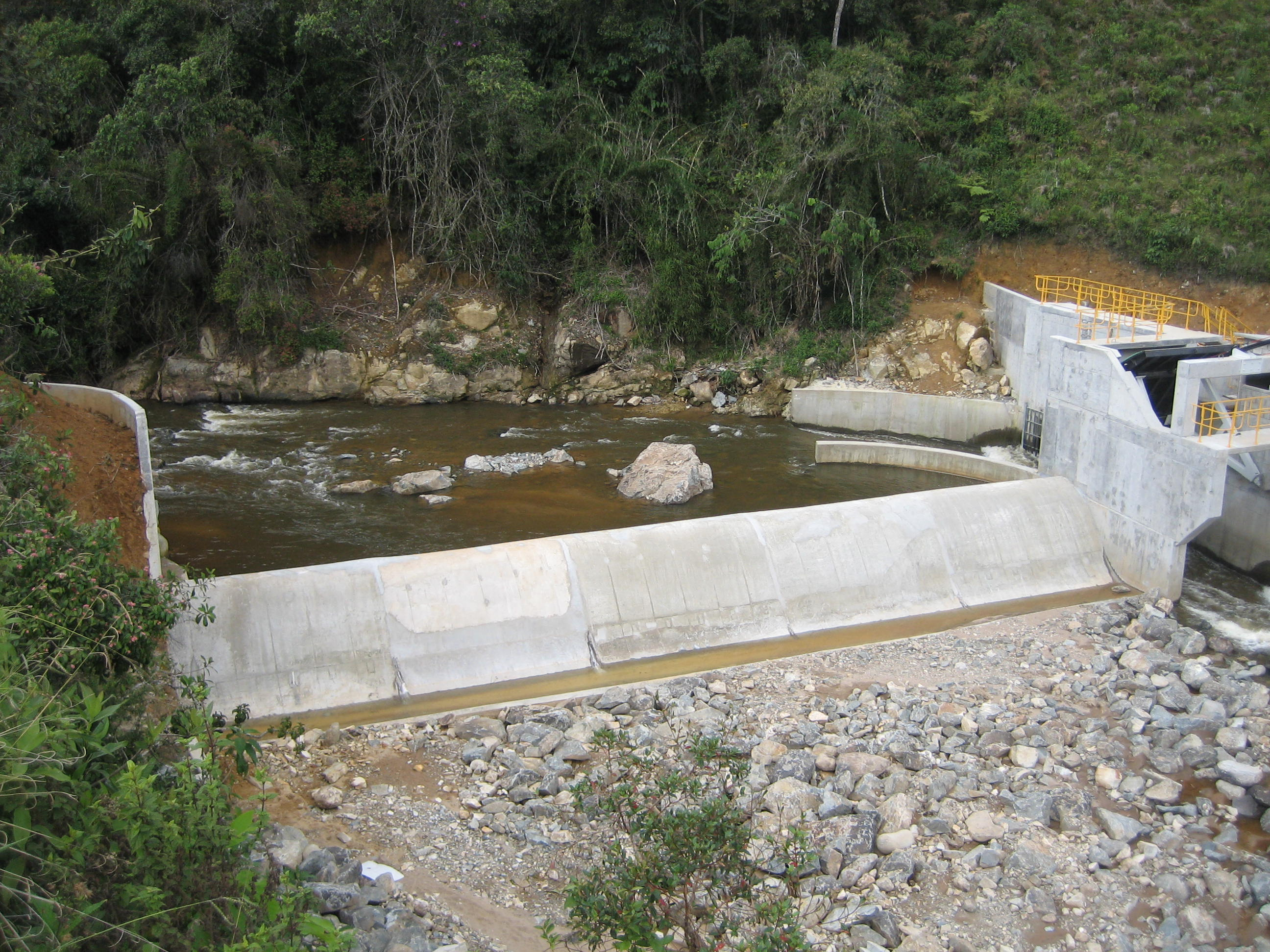

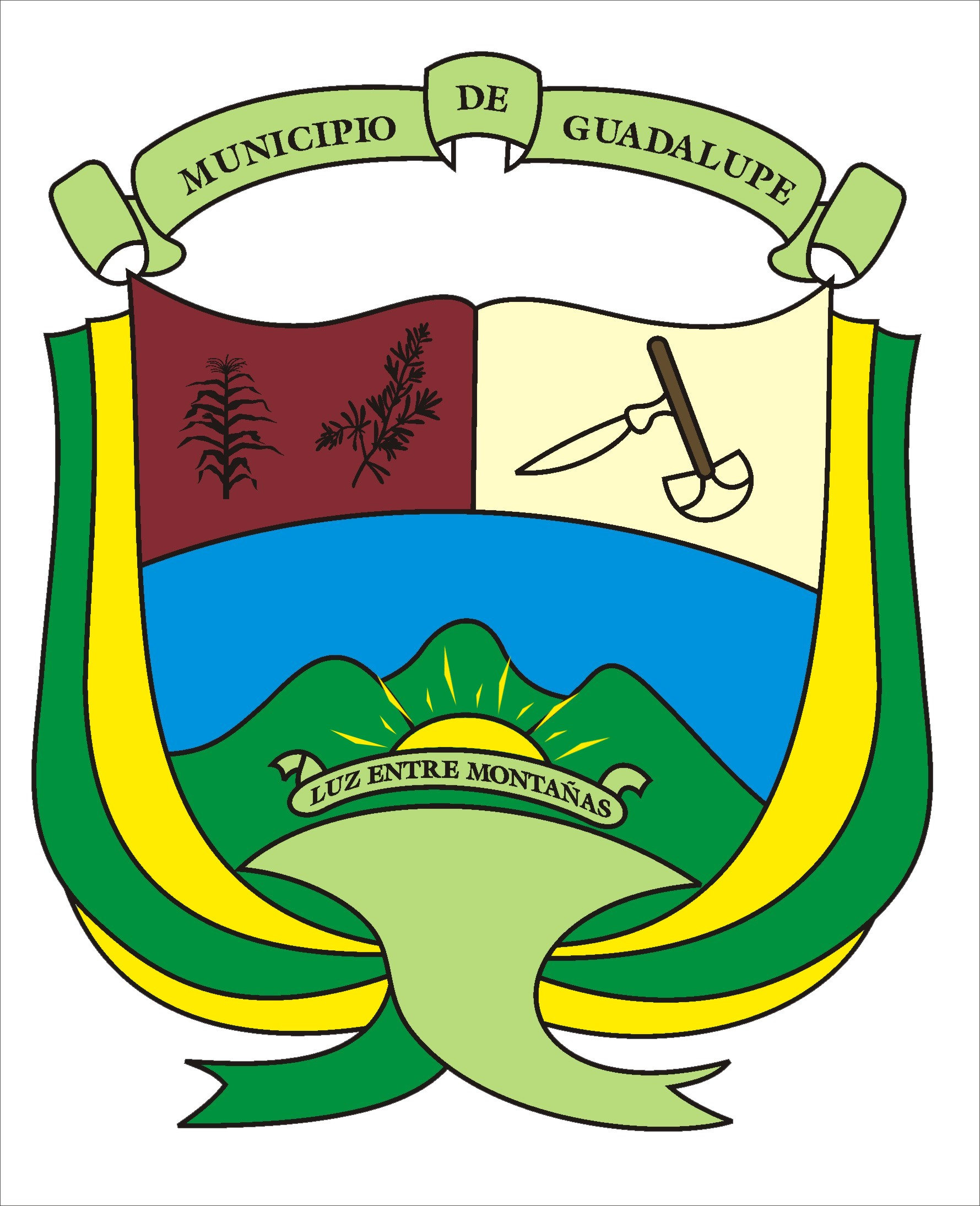
- Flag Coat of arms

- Location of Guadalupe in the Department of Antioquia.

- Location in Colombia
- Coordinates: 06°49′03″N 75°14′39″W
- Country: Colombia
- Department: Antioquia Department
- Subregion: Northern
- Foundation: 1757

Government
  - Mayor: César Augusto Agudelo

Area
  - Total: 87 km^{2} (34 sq mi)
- Elevation: 1,875 m (6,152 ft)

Population (2002)
  - Total: 6,286
  - Density: 72/km^{2} (190/sq mi)
- Time zone: UTC-5 (Colombia Standard Time)

Guadalupe is a town and municipality in the Colombian department of Antioquia. Part of the subregion of Northern Antioquia, it lies at an elevation of 1,875 m (6,152 ft) above sea level.
