= San José de la Montaña =

- Municipality and town
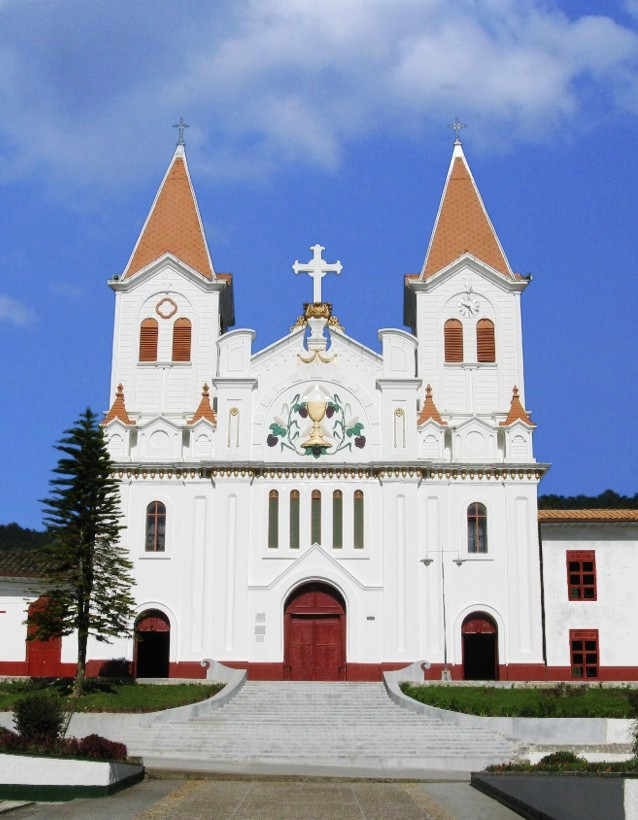

- Flag Coat of arms

- Location of the municipality and town of San José de la Montaña in the Antioquia Department of Colombia

- Location in Colombia
- Coordinates: 6°50′59″N 75°41′1″W
- Country: Colombia
- Department: Antioquia Department
- Subregion: Northern
- Time zone: UTC-5 (Colombia Standard Time)

San José de la Montaña is a town and municipality in the Colombian department of Antioquia, part of the subregion of Northern Antioquia.

Traditional celebrations held in San José de la Montaña include the Fiestas Patronales de San José and the Fiestas de la Virgen del Carmen.
