= Carolina del Príncipe =

Town and municipality in Colombia

Carolina del Príncipe, Antioquia
- Municipality and town
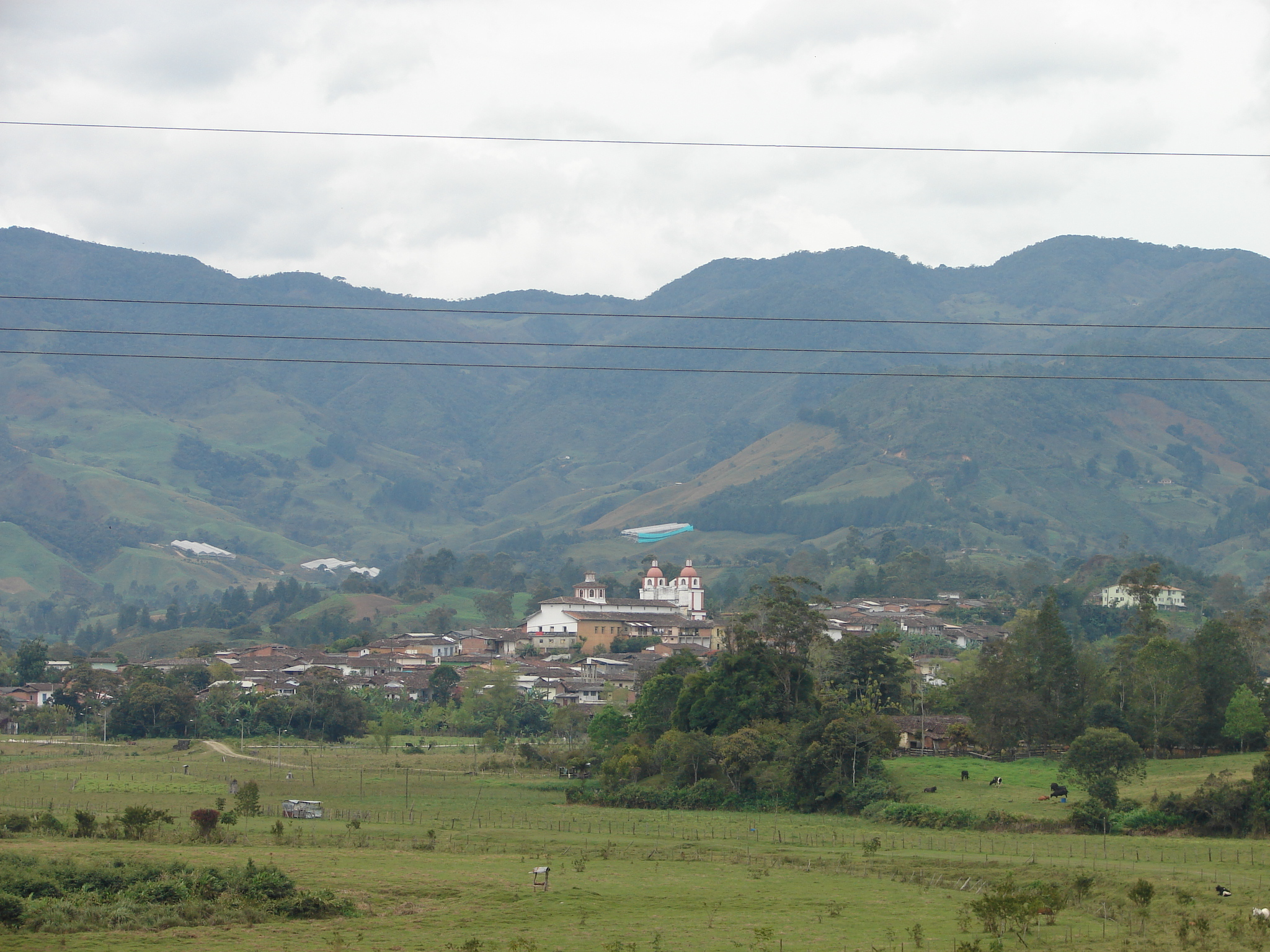

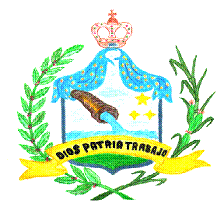
- Flag Coat of arms

- Location of the municipality and town of Carolina del Príncipe, Antioquia in the Antioquia Department of Colombia

- Location in Colombia
- Coordinates: 6°43′22″N 75°16′57″W
- Country: Colombia
- Department: Antioquia Department
- Subregion: Northern
- Time zone: UTC-5 (Colombia Standard Time)

Carolina del Príncipe is a town and municipality in the Colombian department of Antioquia, located 105 km north of Medellín, with an altitude of 1,807 m above sea level. Carolina del Príncipe is part of the subregion of Northern Antioquia.

Carolina is a small town of well-laid-out cobblestone streets, containing many houses with antique handmade wooden balconies. The municipal total area covers some 118 km^{2}, with a mountainous territory corresponding to the central spine of the Andes and bounded by the Concepción or Minavieja, Guadalupe, San Pablo and Tenche rivers. It has a population of 666 inhabitants and its economy is based on animal husbandry (dairy and meat) and the cultivation of maize, sugar cane, rice, cocoa, and corn. The settlement began to form in 1785, being converted into a parish two years later. The name was chosen in honor of Carlos IV of Spain, then the prince in line to be heir of his father's throne. It was constituted as a municipality in 1814.

The city hosts an annual "Balcony Festival" in October.
