= Angostura, Antioquia =

- Municipality and town
- Flag Coat of arms

- Location of the municipality and town of Angostura, Antioquia in the Antioquia Department of Colombia

- Location in Colombia
- Coordinates: 6°53′7″N 75°20′7″W
- Country: Colombia
- Department: Antioquia Department
- Subregion: Northern

Area
  - Total: 387 km^{2} (149 sq mi)

Population (Census 2018)
  - Total: 10,500
  - Density: 27.1/km^{2} (70.3/sq mi)
- Time zone: UTC-5 (Colombia Standard Time)

Angostura is a town and municipality in Antioquia Department, Colombia. It is part of the subregion of Northern Antioquia. The population was 10,500 at the 2018 census.
