= San Pedro de los Milagros =

San Pedro de los Milagros, Antioquia
- Municipality and town
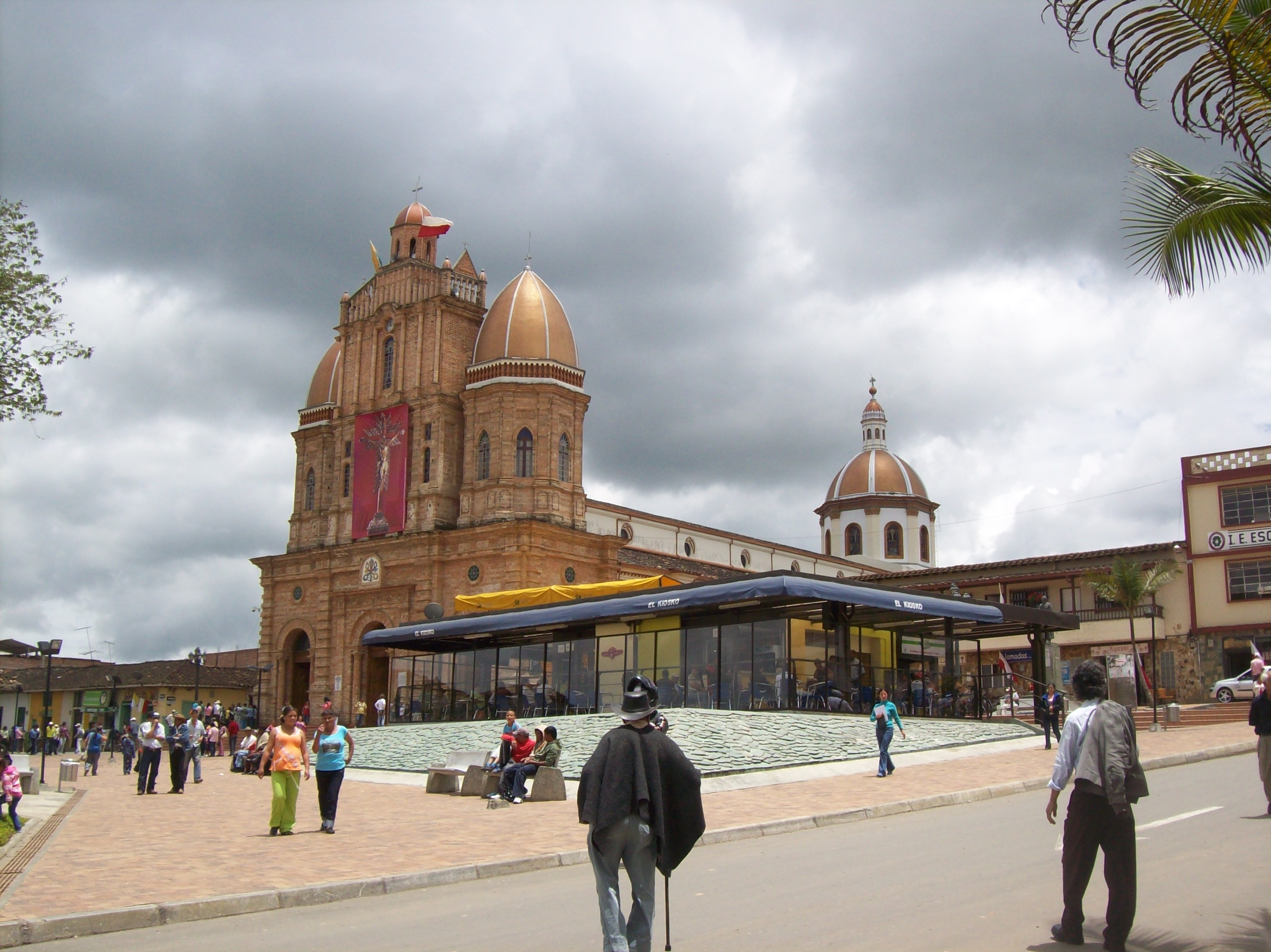

- Flag Coat of arms

- Location of the municipality and town of San Pedro de los Milagros, Antioquia in the Antioquia Department of Colombia

- Location in Colombia
- Coordinates: 6°27′34″N 75°33′28″W
- Country: Colombia
- Department: Antioquia Department
- Subregion: Northern

Population (Census 2018)
  - Total: 17,119
- Time zone: UTC-5 (Colombia Standard Time)

San Pedro de los Milagros is a town and municipality in the Colombian department of Antioquia. Part of the subregion of Northern Antioquia, its population was 17,119 at the 2018 census.
