= Don Matías =

- Municipality and town
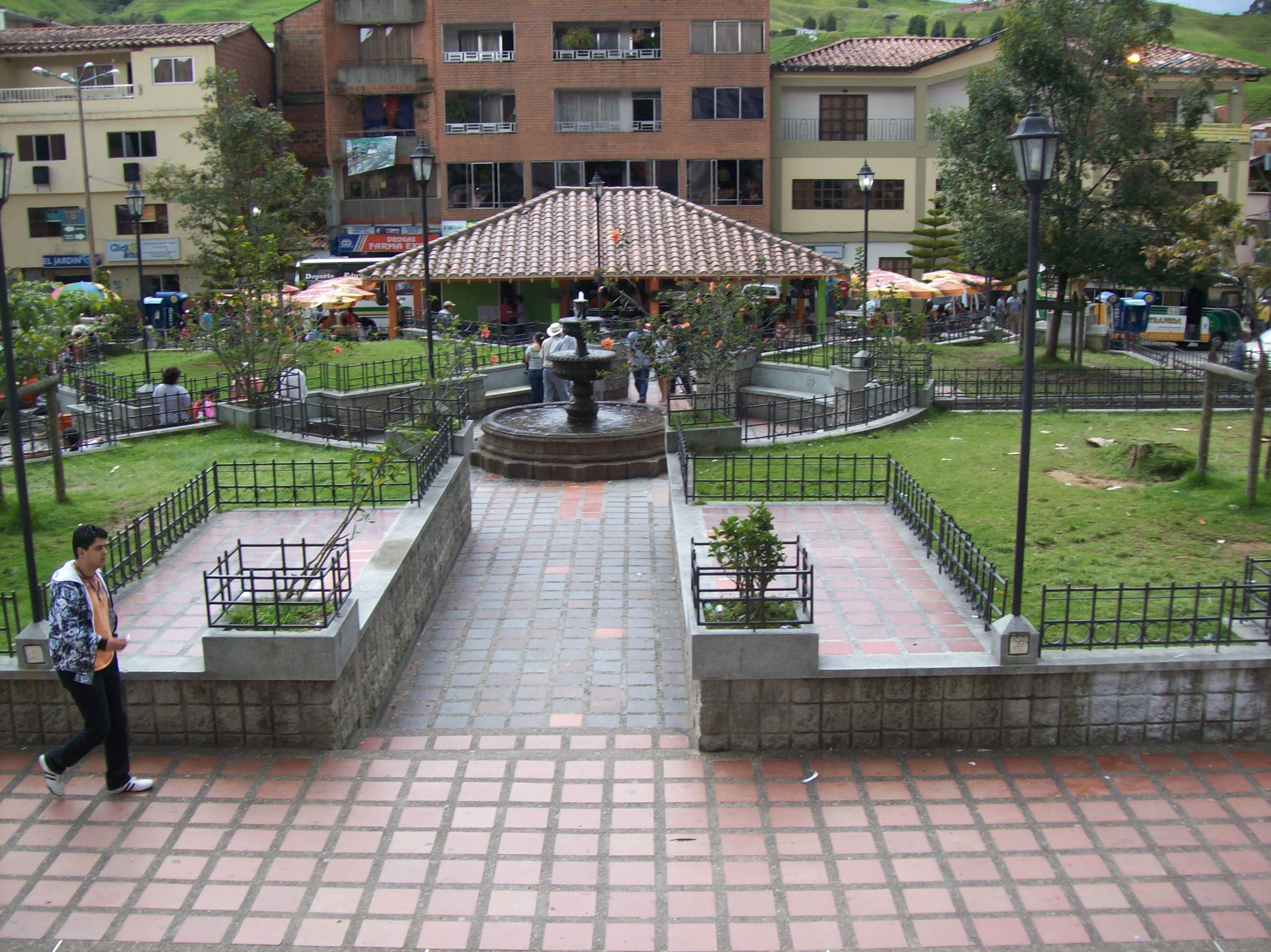

- Flag Coat of arms

- Location of the municipality and town of Don Matías in the Antioquia Department of Colombia

- Location in Colombia
- Coordinates: 6°29′0″N 75°26′0″W
- Country: Colombia
- Department: Antioquia Department
- Subregion: Northern

Population (Census 2018)
  - Total: 14,208
- Time zone: UTC-5 (Colombia Standard Time)

Don Matías is a municipality in Antioquia Department, Colombia. Part of the subregion of Northern Antioquia. Bordered to the north by the municipality of Santa Rosa de Osos, to the east by the municipalities of Santa Rosa de Osos and Santo Domingo, to the south by the municipality of Barbosa, and to the west by the municipality of San Pedro de los Milagros.

== History ==
Since 1624 the Don Matías territory was occupied by settlers from the city of Santa Fe de Antioquia. In 1750 the places San Andrés, Las Ánimas, Las Juntas, La Chorrera began to be populated, and today it forms the urban population.

This occupation was the result of new government policies by the crown of Borbón, which the visitor Mon y Velarde applied in Antioquia, seeking the establishment of agricultural colonies in the north of the province. Those who occupied the present territory of Don Matías were basically mazamorreros, independent miners, who were awarded the title of their plots.

The municipality has had three names: Azuero, San Antonio Infante and Don Matías. The latter, Don Matías was chosen in 1787 in honor of Don Matías Jaramillo, a man who had a rich mining settlement in the territory where the population now lives. The garment industry in the town was established in the 60s, thanks to the decentralization of manufacturing industries in the city of Medellín. In this way came to the township of Don Matías the industrial clothing company, which almost exclusively produced for a company called Caribou. Thus, the community found a source of employment, as the municipality for those years was basically agrarian.

A decade later garment factories began to emerge where those industrial garment company workers, having learned the trade, decided to start their own small industries. Today Don Matías has extensive national and international recognition. One of its main attractions is the Riogrande Dam.

== Demographics ==
The population was 14,208 at the 2018 census. In 2009, the total population was 19,458, with 12,663 inhabitants constituting the urban population and 6,795 counted as rural population. Literacy rate was 91.3% in 2005.

According to figures from the Government of Antioquia based on Quality of Life survey 2004 the prevailing socio-economic strata in the municipality of Don Matías is 2 (low) which includes 70.9% of all homes. It is followed by stratum 3 (medium-low) with a 23.3%. Then there is the stratum 1 (low-high) with 4.4% of homes. Finally there is the 4 (medium) including 1.4% of homes.

== Demography ==
According to figures presented by the DANE census 2005, the ethnic-racial composition of the township are

- Whites & Mestizos (99.7%)
- Afro-Colombians (0.2%)
- Indigenous (0.1%)

== Economy ==
- Livestock: Dairy Cattle, Pigs
- Industry: Apparel
- Timber

Don Matías bases its economy mostly on the textile and apparel industry, pigs and dairy cattle, and the timber industry.
