= Gómez Plata =

- Municipality and town
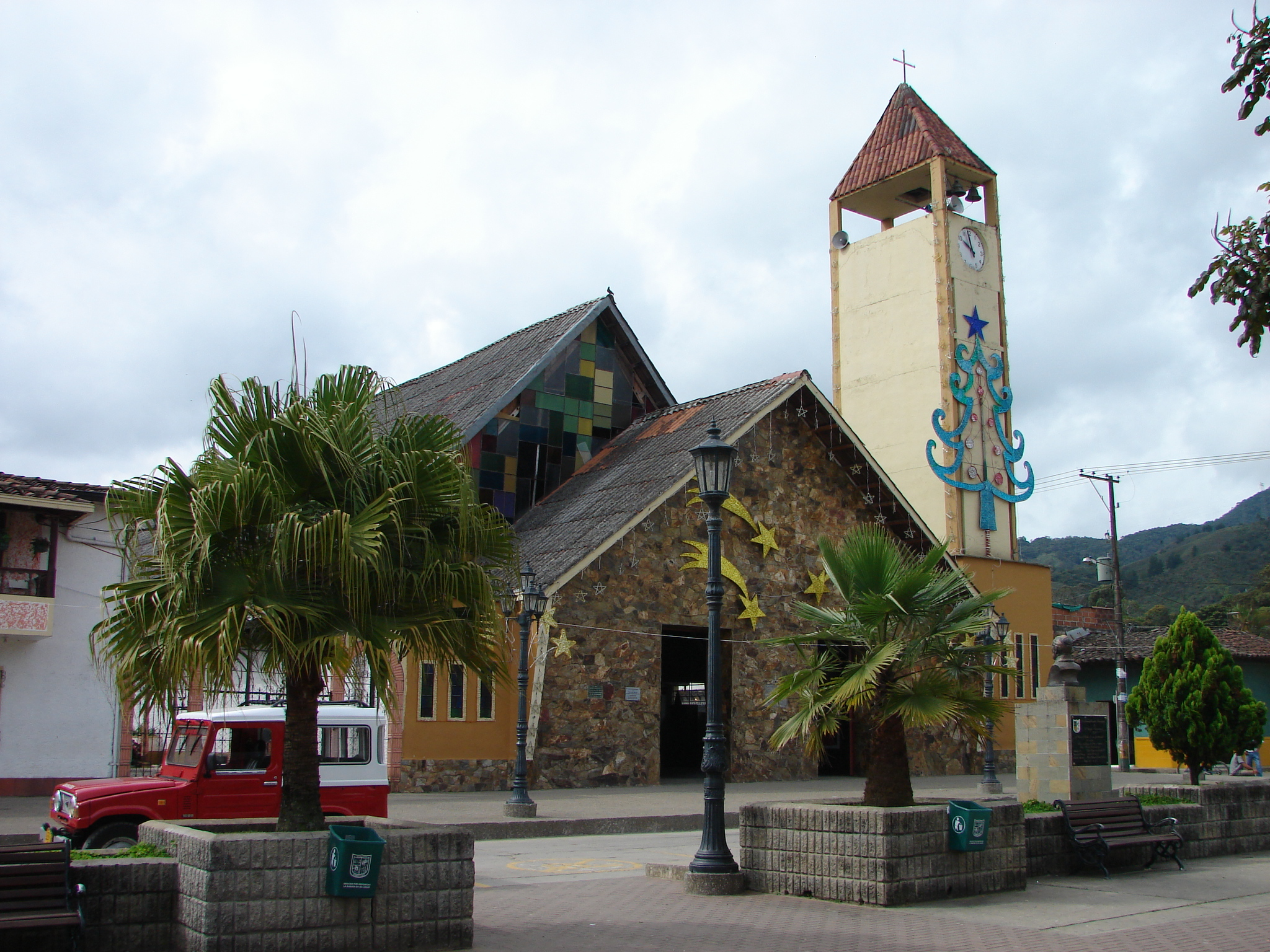

- Flag

- Location of the municipality and town of Gómez Plata in the Antioquia Department of Colombia

- Location in Colombia
- Coordinates: 6°40′54″N 75°13′5″W
- Country: Colombia
- Department: Antioquia Department
- Subregion: Northern

Area
  - Total: 360 km^{2} (140 sq mi)

Population (Census 2018)
  - Total: 8,235
  - Density: 23/km^{2} (59/sq mi)
- Time zone: UTC-5 (Colombia Standard Time)

Gómez Plata is a town and municipality in the Colombian department of Antioquia. It is part of the subregion of Northern Antioquia. The population was 8,235 at the 2018 census.

== Climate ==
Gómez Plata has a humid subtropical climate (Cfa) due to altitude. It has very heavy rainfall year round.

Climate data for Gómez Plata
Month	Jan	Feb	Mar	Apr	May	Jun	Jul	Aug	Sep	Oct	Nov	Dec	Year
Mean daily maximum °C (°F)	24.5 (76.1)	24.9 (76.8)	25.4 (77.7)	25.4 (77.7)	25.1 (77.2)	24.9 (76.8)	25.7 (78.3)	25.3 (77.5)	24.8 (76.6)	24.1 (75.4)	23.7 (74.7)	24.5 (76.1)	24.9 (76.7)
Daily mean °C (°F)	19.6 (67.3)	19.9 (67.8)	20.5 (68.9)	20.8 (69.4)	20.5 (68.9)	20.1 (68.2)	20.4 (68.7)	20.0 (68.0)	19.7 (67.5)	19.6 (67.3)	19.2 (66.6)	19.2 (66.6)	20.0 (67.9)
Mean daily minimum °C (°F)	14.8 (58.6)	15.0 (59.0)	15.7 (60.3)	16.2 (61.2)	16.0 (60.8)	15.4 (59.7)	15.1 (59.2)	14.8 (58.6)	14.7 (58.5)	15.1 (59.2)	14.8 (58.6)	13.9 (57.0)	15.1 (59.2)
Average rainfall mm (inches)	83.7 (3.30)	114.9 (4.52)	188.5 (7.42)	343.8 (13.54)	438.9 (17.28)	327.0 (12.87)	304.7 (12.00)	333.3 (13.12)	406.4 (16.00)	381.3 (15.01)	274.2 (10.80)	149.1 (5.87)	3,345.8 (131.73)
Average rainy days	7	9	13	19	20	16	16	18	20	20	16	11	185
Source 1:
Source 2:
