= Entrerríos =

- Municipality and town
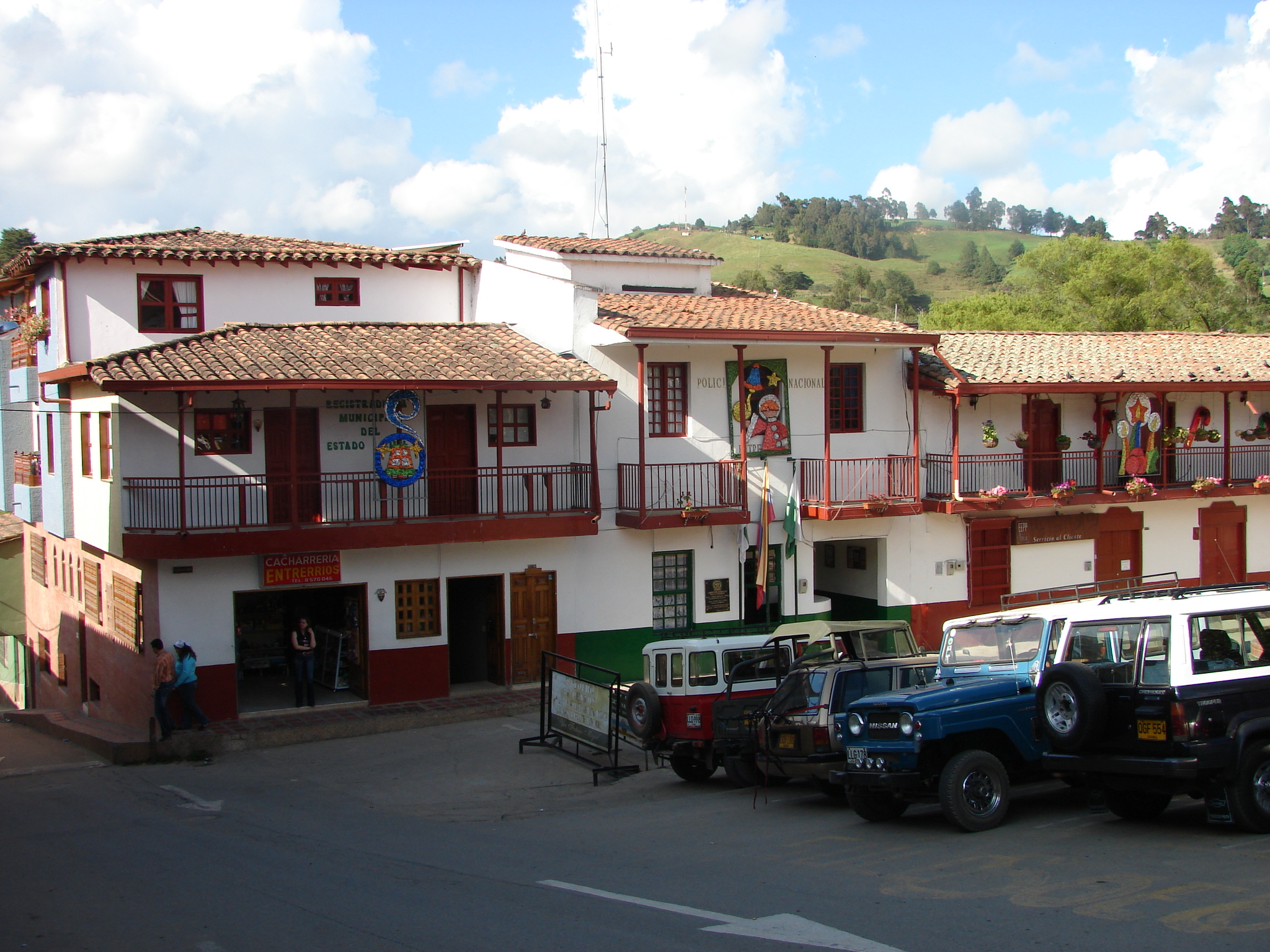

- Flag

- Location of the municipality and town of Entrerríos in the Antioquia Department of Colombia

- Location in Colombia
- Coordinates: 6°33′55″N 75°30′51″W
- Country: Colombia
- Department: Antioquia Department
- Subregion: Northern

Area
  - Total: 219 km^{2} (85 sq mi)

Population (Census 2018)
  - Total: 8,820
  - Density: 40.3/km^{2} (104/sq mi)
- Time zone: UTC-5 (Colombia Standard Time)

Entrerrios is a municipality in the Colombian subregion of Northern Antioquia, in the department of Antioquia. The population was 8,820 at the 2018 census. The population, according to the 2002 census, was 8,305.
