= Antioquia Department =

Department of Colombia

Department of Antioquia Departamento de Antioquia
- Department
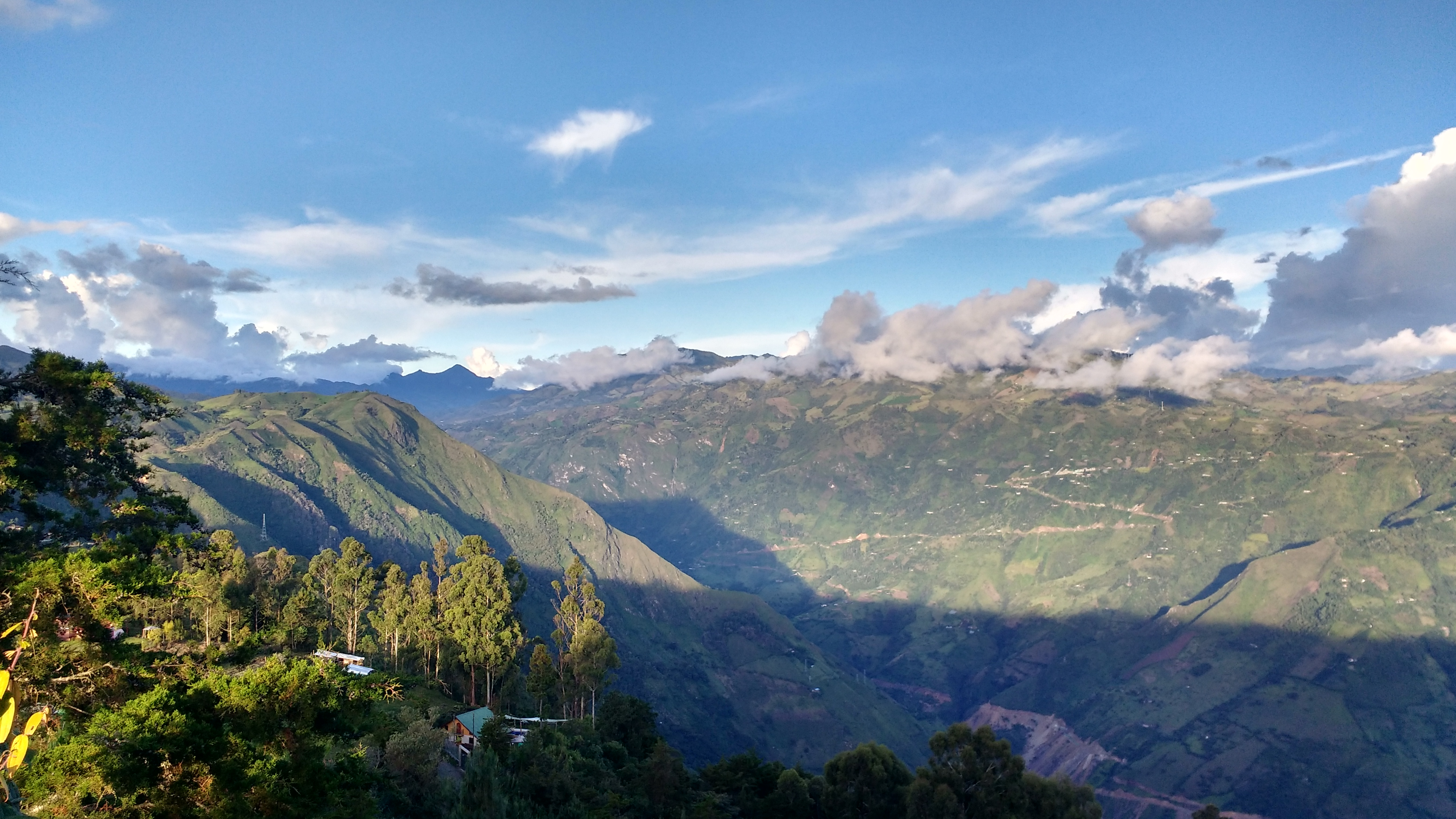
- The Sonsón Páramo

- Flag Coat of arms
- Anthem: Himno de Antioquia Himno Antioqueño: ¡Oh libertad!
- Antioquia shown in red

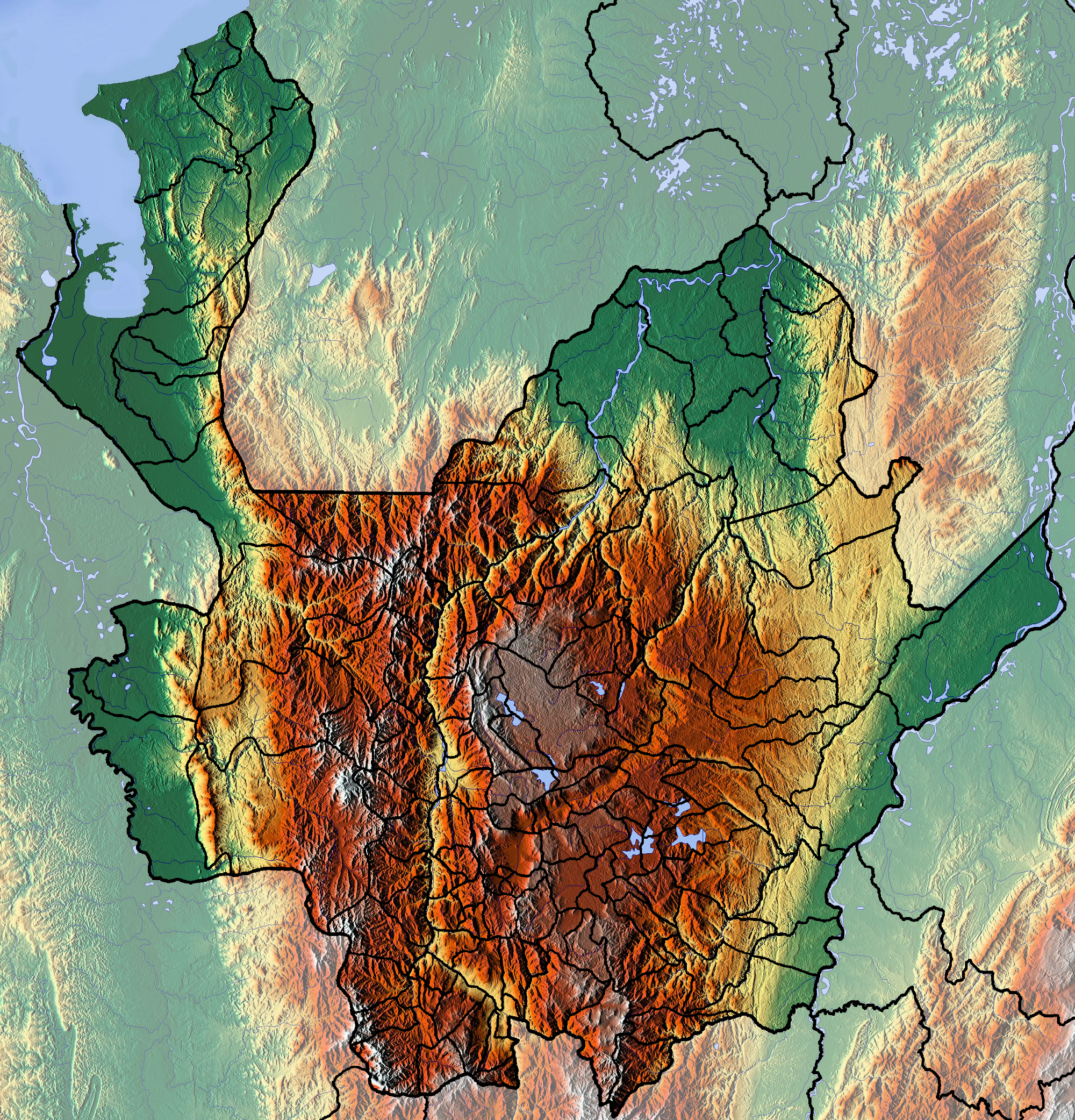
- Topography of the department
- Coordinates: 6°13′N 75°34′W
- Country: Colombia
- Region: Andean Region
- Department: 1886
- Republic: 1813
- Province: 1576
- Capital: Medellín

Government
  - Governor: Andrés Julián Rendon

Area
  - Total: 63,612 km^{2} (24,561 sq mi)
  - Rank: 6th

Population (2023)
  - Total: 6,994,792
  - Rank: 2nd
  - Density: 109.96/km^{2} (284.80/sq mi)
  - Demonym: Antioqueño -a

GDP
  - Total: COP 212,515 billion (US$ 49.9 billion)
- Time zone: UTC-05
- ISO 3166 code: CO-ANT
- Provinces: 9
- Municipalities: 125
- HDI: 0.793 high · 10th of 33
- Website: antioquia.gov.co

Antioquia (Spanish pronunciation: [anˈtjokja]) is one of the 32 departments of Colombia, located in the central northwestern part of Colombia with a narrow section that borders the Caribbean Sea. Most of its territory is mountainous with some valleys, much of which is part of the Andes mountain range. Antioquia has been part of many territorial divisions of former countries created within the present-day territory of Colombia. Before the adoption of the Colombian Constitution of 1886, Antioquia State had a sovereign government.

The department covers an area of 63,612 km^{2} (24,561 sq mi), and has a population of 6,994,792 (2023). Antioquia borders the Córdoba department and the Caribbean Sea to the north; Chocó to the west; the departments of Bolívar, Santander, and Boyaca to the east; and the departments of Caldas and Risaralda to the south.

Medellín is Antioquia's capital and the second-largest city in the country. Other important towns are Rionegro located in the East, Apartadó on the Caribbean Coast, Santa Fe de Antioquia, the old capital on the Cauca River, and Puerto Berrío on the Magdalena.

== Geography ==
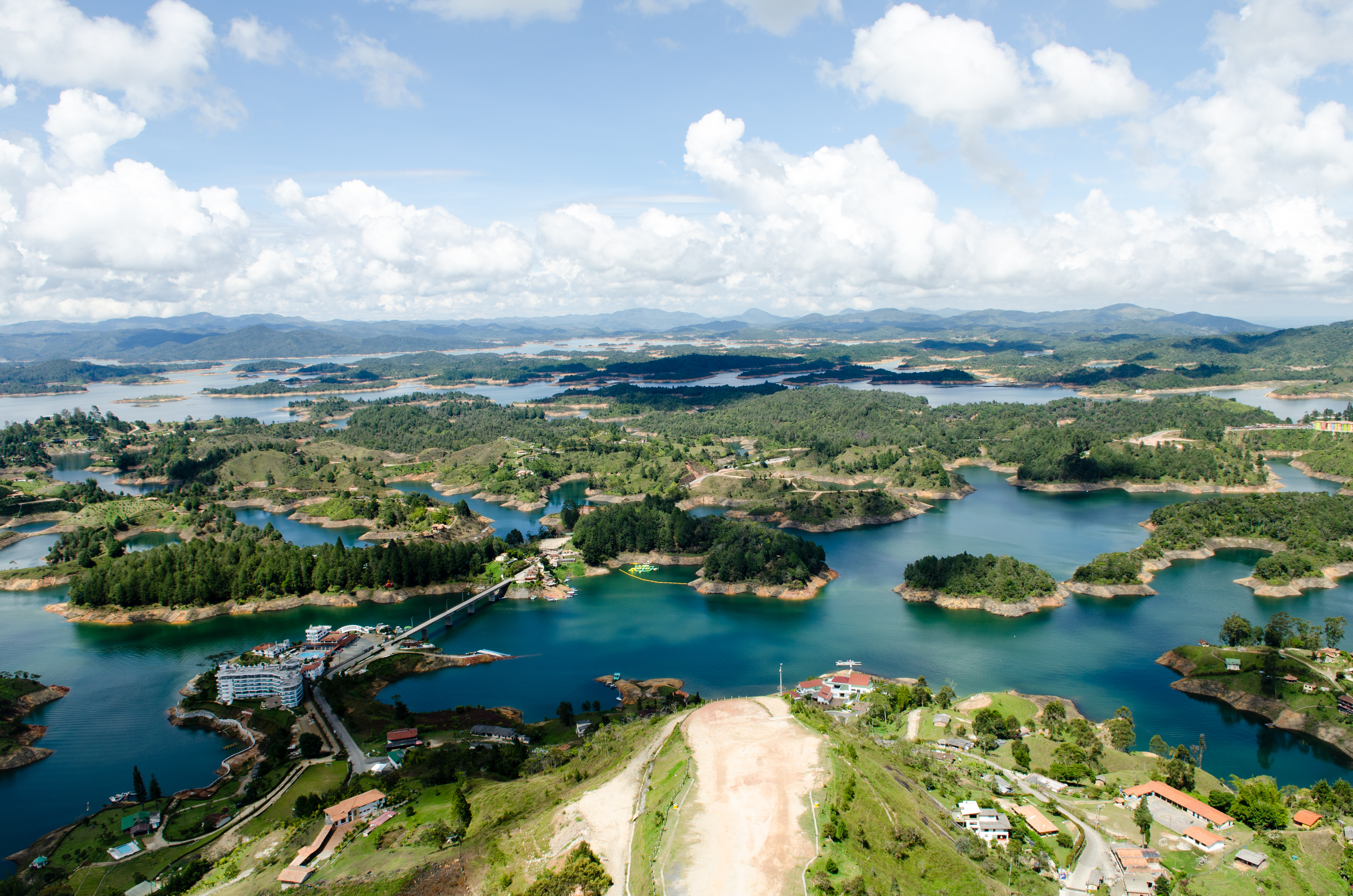
Guatapé reservoir

Antioquia is the sixth-largest department of Colombia. It is predominantly mountainous, crossed by the Cordillera Central and the Cordillera Occidental of the Andes. The Cordillera Central divides to form the Aburrá valley, in which the capital, Medellín, is located. The Cordillera Central forms the plateaus of Santa Rosa de Osos and Rionegro.

While 80% of the department's territory is mountainous, Antioquia also has lowlands in Bajo Cauca, Magdalena Medio, and eastern Sonsón, as well as coastline on the Caribbean Sea, in Urabá. This area has a tropical climate and is of high strategic importance due to its location.

== Toponymy ==
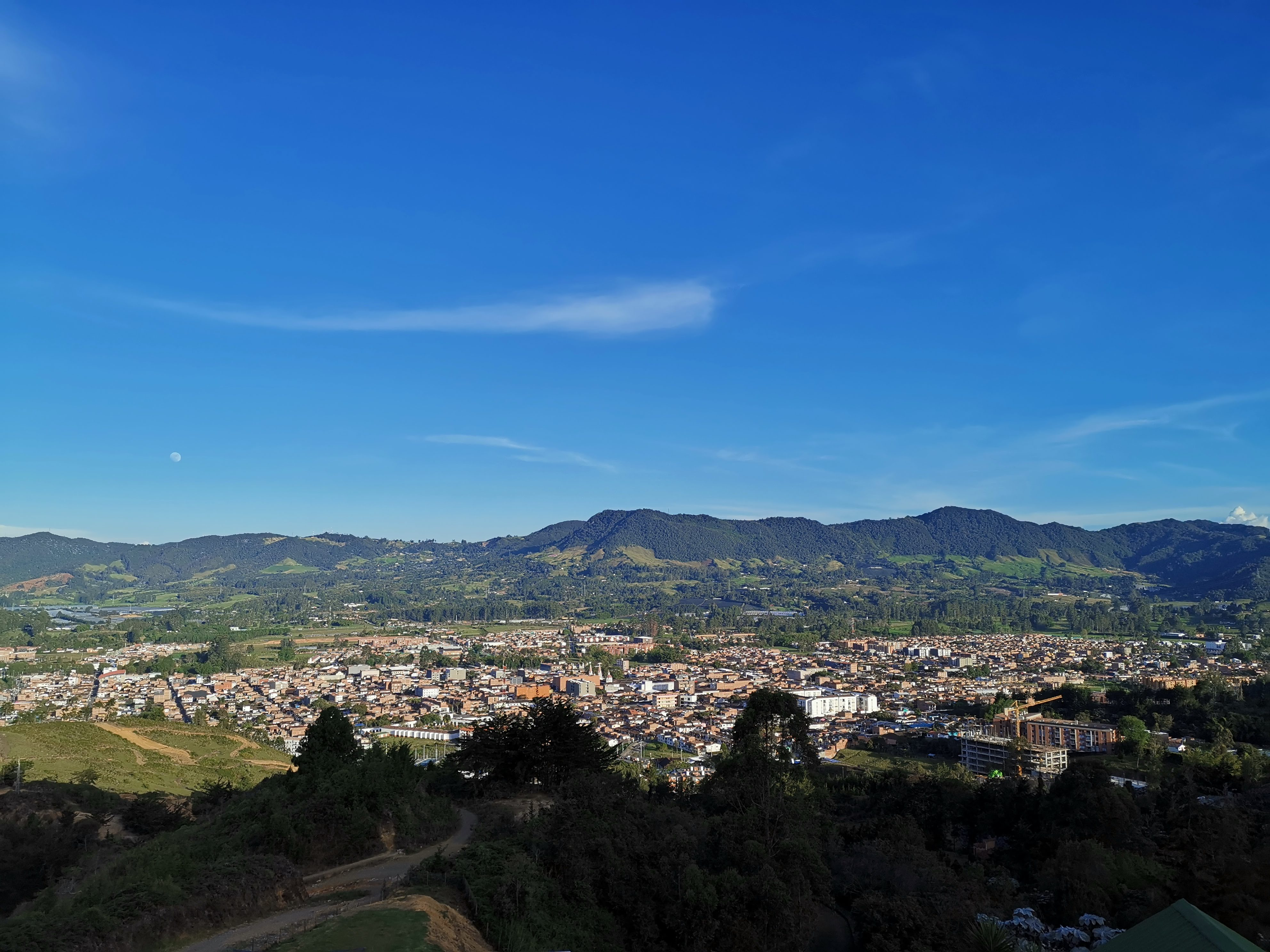
La Ceja

The basis for the name Antioquia is uncertain. A common explanation is that it was named after the Hellenistic-founded city in Syria of Antioch on the Orontes (Greek: Ἀντιόχεια Antiocheia, Arabic: Antāqiyyah, now officially Antakya, Turkey). The region of Colombia known as the Coffee Zone has a strong influence from Arab Jews, both demographically and culturally, and many towns and cities are named after cities in the Middle East. Moreover, ancient Antioch played a significant role in developing the communities of early Christianity and thus was important to the Catholic Spaniard conquistadors.

There are many other cities in the Middle East named Antiochia, which were likewise named for the Antiochid rulers during the Seleucid Empire (312–63 BC).

== History ==
=== Native people of Antioquia ===
Before Spanish colonization, Indigenous peoples inhabited the Antioquia region. Some specialists believe they came from Caribbean Sea, while others say they came from the interior Amazon River.

Antioquia was primarily populated by the Kalina or "Mainland Caribs." Some scattered groups of Muisca were said to be present in the Darién region, a coastal region in the far north that is now in Panama, but no historical records refer to Muisca in Antioquia.

The Kalina in Antioquia comprised smaller groups called families. The most prominent were the Catía, Nutabe, and Tahamí, who inhabited central Antioquia. The Quimbaya occupied southern Antioquia.

The Quimbaya, Kalina, and Muisca were the most prominent groups the conquistadores encountered upon their arrival in Antioquia.

The Spaniards had a turbulent history of encounters with the Carib. Although the tribe was numerous and known for its warring culture, the Spaniards dominated or exterminated them in the process of conquest and colonization. Like all indigenous peoples of the Americas, many died in virgin soil epidemics of diseases endemic to Eurasia.

Some surviving natives dispersed to evade the Spanish, and some committed suicide to escape slavery. Many survivors fled to what is now Chocó department. Barely 0.5% of Antioquia's population is Indigenous, but most residents have a significant Indigenous genetic component (26% on average).

=== Basque and Jewish influence in Antioquia ===
Spain's Basque Country and Jews have influenced Antioquia and its language since the Spanish colonization. This began in 1499 during the third voyage of Columbus. The owner and master of the Santa María, second in command to Columbus, was Juan de la Cosa, nicknamed el Vizcaino ("the Biscayan"). Hundreds of Basques settled in the area, sponsored by the Spanish colonization companies.

==== Dialect ====
Immigrants influenced the Spanish spoken in Antioquia in several ways:

- Immigrants from Andalusia and the Canary Islands brought their preference for seseo, a uniform pronunciation of "s", "z", and soft "c".
- However, those from Extremadura favored an apico-alveolar sound (part way to "sh").
- The digraph "ll" (double L) is affricative, like English "j".
- Certain words beginning with "r" are prefixed by "a" (with the "r" doubled to continue to indicate that it is trilled):
  - arrecostarse instead of recostarse
  - arrecoger instead of recoger
  - arrecordarse instead of recordarse.
- Specific words have been adopted, such as coscorria (useless, inept) and tap (tap).

==== Local character ====
It has been asserted since the mid-nineteenth century that Basque and Jewish origins have influenced the character of Antioquia. Specific evidence of cultural contribution is sparse, perhaps partly because Basque is not dominant in Spain. However, American historian Everett Hagen sampled the Medellín telephone directory in 1957 and found that 15% of the surnames were of Basque origin, but 25% of the employers were. He concluded that Basque influence was important in explaining the increased industrial development of Antioquia in Colombia. The study reinforced notions of the character of social groups, though it has been criticized as stereotypical.

=== Spaniards in Antioquia ===
The first Spaniard known to have visited the territory now known as Antioquia was Rodrigo de Bastidas, who explored the area around the future site of Darién in 1500. Ten years later, Alonso de Ojeda founded San Sebastián de Urabá, 2 km from the present-day town of Necoclí. It was later destroyed by the natives. The first Spanish military incursion into Antioquia, however, was not made until 1537. An expedition commanded by Francisco César traveled through the lands of chief Dabeiba, arriving at the Cauca River. They were said to have taken important treasures from the indigenous people's tombs. In response, the warriors of chief Nutibara harassed the Spaniards continually, and forced them to return to Urabá.

The Río Samaná Sur (South Samaná River) which forms part of the boundary between the departments of Caldas and Antioquia near the rural settlement of Puente Linda

In 1541, the conquistador Jorge Robledo departed from the site of the future (1542) Spanish town of Arma, a little below Aguadas in the North of Caldas, to lead an expedition north on the Cauca River.

Farther north, Robledo would found the city of Santa Fe de Antioquia, which in 1813 was declared the capital of the sovereign and independent state of Antioquia, and remained the seat of the governate until 1826, when Medellín was designated the capital.

=== 16th to the 21st centuries ===
Due to its geographical isolation, being located among mountains, Antioquia suffered supply problems. Its topography did not allow for much agriculture, so the city became dependent upon trade, especially of gold and gin for the colonization of new land. Much of this trade was due to reforms passed after a 1785 visit from Juan Antonio Mon y Velarde, an inspector of the Spanish Crown. The Antioquia became colonizers and traders.

The department was hard hit by the Colombian conflict, with 30,000 people missing between 1997 and 2005.

The Wall Street Journal and Citi announced in the year 2013 that Medellín, the capital of the department of Antioquia, is the winner of the City of the Year competition, a global program developed in partnership with the Urban Land Institute to recognize the most innovative urban centers. Medellín was ranked above the other finalists, Tel Aviv and New York City.

== Administrative divisions ==
=== Subregions and municipalities ===
Antioquia is divided into nine subregions to facilitate the Department's administration. These nine regions contain a total of 125 municipalities. The nine subregions with their municipalities are:

Southwestern Antioquia	Eastern Antioquia	Northeastern Antioquia
Amagá • Andes • Angelópolis • Betania • Bolívar • Betulia • Caramanta • Concordia • Fredonia • Hispania • Jardín • Jericó • La Pintada • Montebello • Pueblorrico • Salgar • Santa Bárbara • Támesis • Tarso • Titiribí • Urrao • Valparaíso • Venecia	Abejorral • Alejandría • Argelia • El Carmen de Viboral • Cocorná • Concepción • El Peñol • Granada • Guarne • Guatapé • La Ceja • La Unión • Marinilla • Nariño • Retiro • Rionegro • San Carlos • San Francisco • San Luis • San Rafael • San Vicente • El Santuario • Sonsón	Amalfi • Anorí • Cisneros • Remedios • San Roque • Santo Domingo • Segovia • Vegachi • Yali • Yolombó

Northern Antioquia	Western Antioquia	Bajo Cauca Antioquia
Angostura • Belmira • Briceño • Campamento • Carolina del Príncipe • Don Matías • Entrerríos • Gómez Plata • Guadalupe • Ituango • San Andrés • San José de la Montaña • San Pedro • Santa Rosa de Osos • Toledo • Valdivia • Yarumal	Abriaquí • Antioquia • Anzá • Armenia • Buriticá • Caicedo • Cañasgordas • Dabeiba • Ebéjico • Frontino • Giraldo • Heliconia • Liborina • Olaya • Peque • Sabanalarga • San Jerónimo • Sopetrán • Uramita	Caucasia • Cáceres • El Bagre • Nechí • Tarazá • Zaragoza

Magdalena Medio Antioquia	Urabá Antioquia	Metropolitan Aburrá Valley
Caracolí • Maceo • Puerto Berrío • Puerto Nare • Puerto Triunfo • Yondó	Apartadó • Arboletes • Carepa • Chigorodó • Murindó • Mutatá • Turbo • Necoclí • San Juan de Urabá • San Pedro de Urabá • Vigía del Fuerte	Barbosa • Bello • Caldas • Copacabana • Envigado • Girardota • Itagüí • La Estrella • Medellín • Sabaneta

== Demographics ==
Historical population
Year	Pop.	±%
1905	673,270	—
1912	735,470	+9.2%
1918	832,200	+13.2%
1928	1,011,000	+21.5%
1938	1,188,587	+17.6%
1951	1,540,652	+29.6%
1964	2,477,299	+60.8%
1973	2,965,116	+19.7%
1985	4,067,664	+37.2%
1993	4,919,619	+20.9%
2005	5,696,183	+15.8%
2018	6,407,102	+12.5%
2023	6,994,792	+9.2%

The population of Antioquia is 6,994,792 (2023), of which more than half live in the metropolitan area of Medellín. The racial composition is:

- White / Mestizo (88.6%)
- Black or Afro-Colombian (10.9%)
- Indigenous or Amerindian (0.5%)

During the 16th and 18th centuries, Antioquia received many immigrants from Spain, especially northern Spain. Most Indigenous peoples died from the introduction of European diseases, and many of those who survived intermarried with early Spanish settlers, who were mostly men; later, Spanish women also began to immigrate. Thousands of Scottish and English who settled in Antioquia fought for the Colombian army during independence. During the 19th and 20th centuries, immigrants (including Jews) arrived from Italy, Germany, United Kingdom, France, Portugal, Lebanon, Israel, Palestine and Syria. Many people from Antioquia are referred to as Paisas, people of mainly Spanish ancestry, a lot of them Basque. There is a small Afro-Colombian and Zambo-Colombian (people of Indigenous and African descent) population originating in the majority of the Urabá subregion and the neighboring departments of Chocó, Córdoba and Sucre.

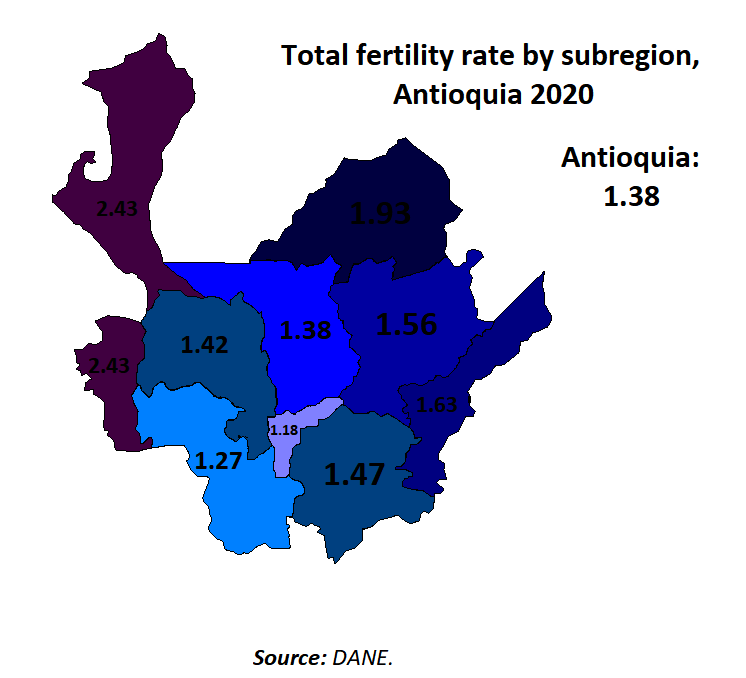
Total fertility rate by subregion, Antioquia 2020.

== Notable people ==
- Walter Noriega (1979) footballer
- Maluma (1994) singer, songwriter, and actor
- J Balvin (1985) singer
- Karol G (1991) singer and songwriter
- Federico Gutiérrez (1974) politician
- Juanes (1972) musician
- Sebastián Yatra (1994) singer, songwriter, and actor
- Camilo (1994) singer, musician and songwriter
- Pablo Escobar (1949–1993) drug lord
- Ana Fabricia Córdoba (c.1959 – 2011), human rights activist
- Jhon Durán (2003) footballer

== See also ==
- Coat of arms of Antioquia Department
- Flag of Antioquia Department
- List of municipalities in Antioquia
- Postage stamps and postal history of Antioquia
