= Belmira =

- Municipality and town
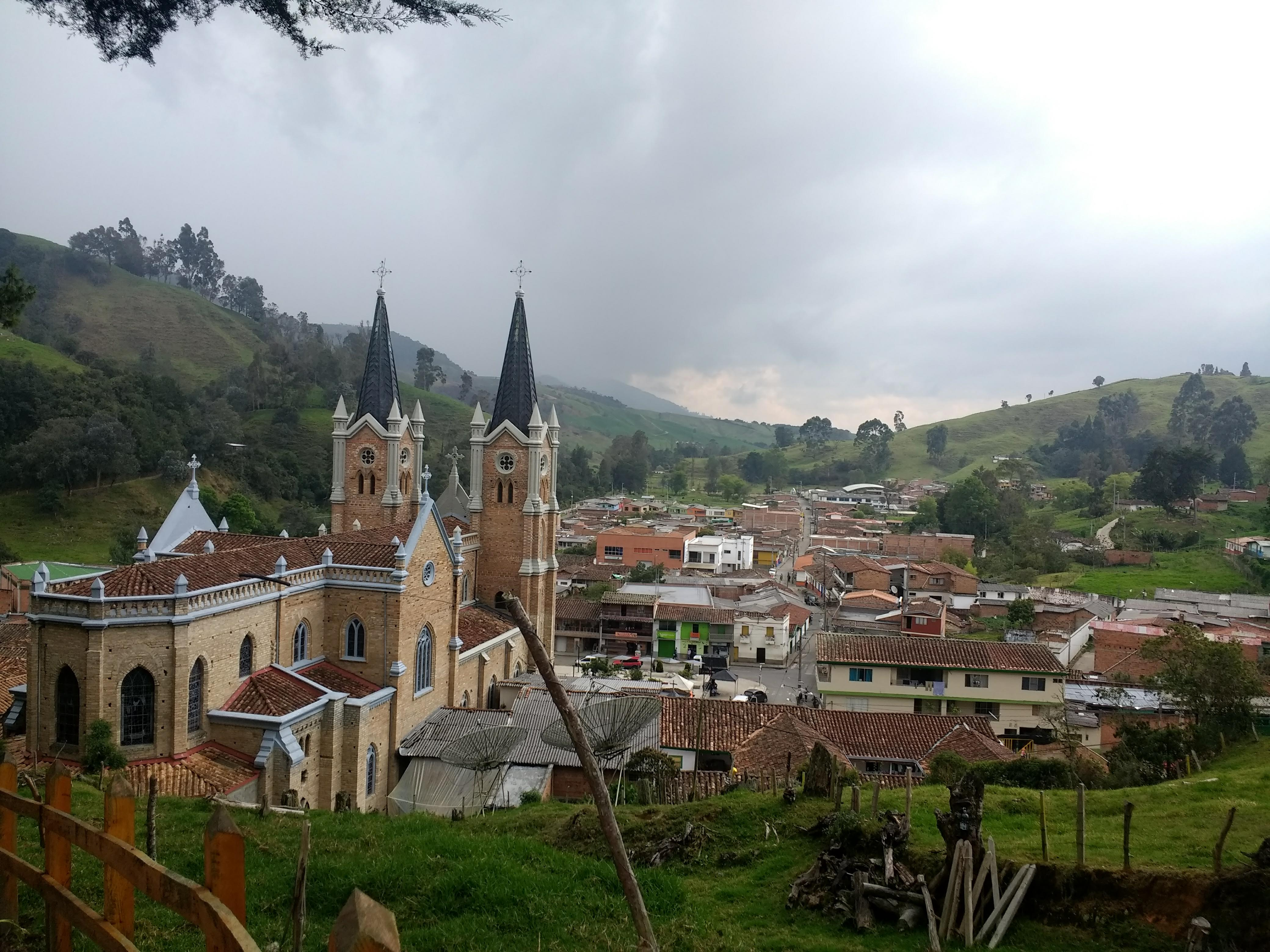

- Flag Coat of arms

- Location of the municipality and town of Belmira in the Antioquia Department of Colombia

- Location in Colombia
- Coordinates: 6°36′18″N 75°39′57″W
- Country: Colombia
- Department: Antioquia Department
- Subregion: Northern
- Elevation: 2,550 m (8,370 ft)
- Time zone: UTC-5 (Colombia Standard Time)

Belmira is a town and municipality in the northern subregion of the Colombian department of Antioquia. It is approximately 62 km from the city of Medellin. It lies at an altitude of 2,550 m (8,370 ft) above sea level.

== Climate ==
Belmira has a cold subtropical highland climate (Cfb). It has heavy rainfall year round.

Every December the town holds a traditional festival called Fiestas De La Trucha. The festival consists of a fishing competition and musical performances by local and traditional artists.

Climate data for Belmira
Month	Jan	Feb	Mar	Apr	May	Jun	Jul	Aug	Sep	Oct	Nov	Dec	Year
Mean daily maximum °C (°F)	20.7 (69.3)	20.8 (69.4)	21.3 (70.3)	21.1 (70.0)	20.7 (69.3)	20.6 (69.1)	21.1 (70.0)	20.9 (69.6)	20.3 (68.5)	19.7 (67.5)	19.7 (67.5)	20.4 (68.7)	20.6 (69.1)
Daily mean °C (°F)	15.1 (59.2)	15.3 (59.5)	15.9 (60.6)	16.1 (61.0)	15.9 (60.6)	15.7 (60.3)	15.6 (60.1)	15.5 (59.9)	15.2 (59.4)	15.0 (59.0)	14.9 (58.8)	14.8 (58.6)	15.4 (59.8)
Mean daily minimum °C (°F)	9.5 (49.1)	9.9 (49.8)	10.6 (51.1)	11.2 (52.2)	11.2 (52.2)	10.8 (51.4)	10.2 (50.4)	10.1 (50.2)	10.1 (50.2)	10.4 (50.7)	10.1 (50.2)	9.3 (48.7)	10.3 (50.5)
Average rainfall mm (inches)	89.5 (3.52)	114.3 (4.50)	175.2 (6.90)	231.6 (9.12)	262.0 (10.31)	165.6 (6.52)	154.1 (6.07)	153.1 (6.03)	210.4 (8.28)	248.3 (9.78)	209.6 (8.25)	134.1 (5.28)	2,147.8 (84.56)
Average rainy days	9	10	16	18	20	15	16	15	18	20	19	13	189
Source 1:
Source 2:
