= Basilica of Our Lady of Mercy (Yarumal) =

Minor basilica in Yarumal, Colombia

- Basílica Menor de Nuestra Señora de la Merced
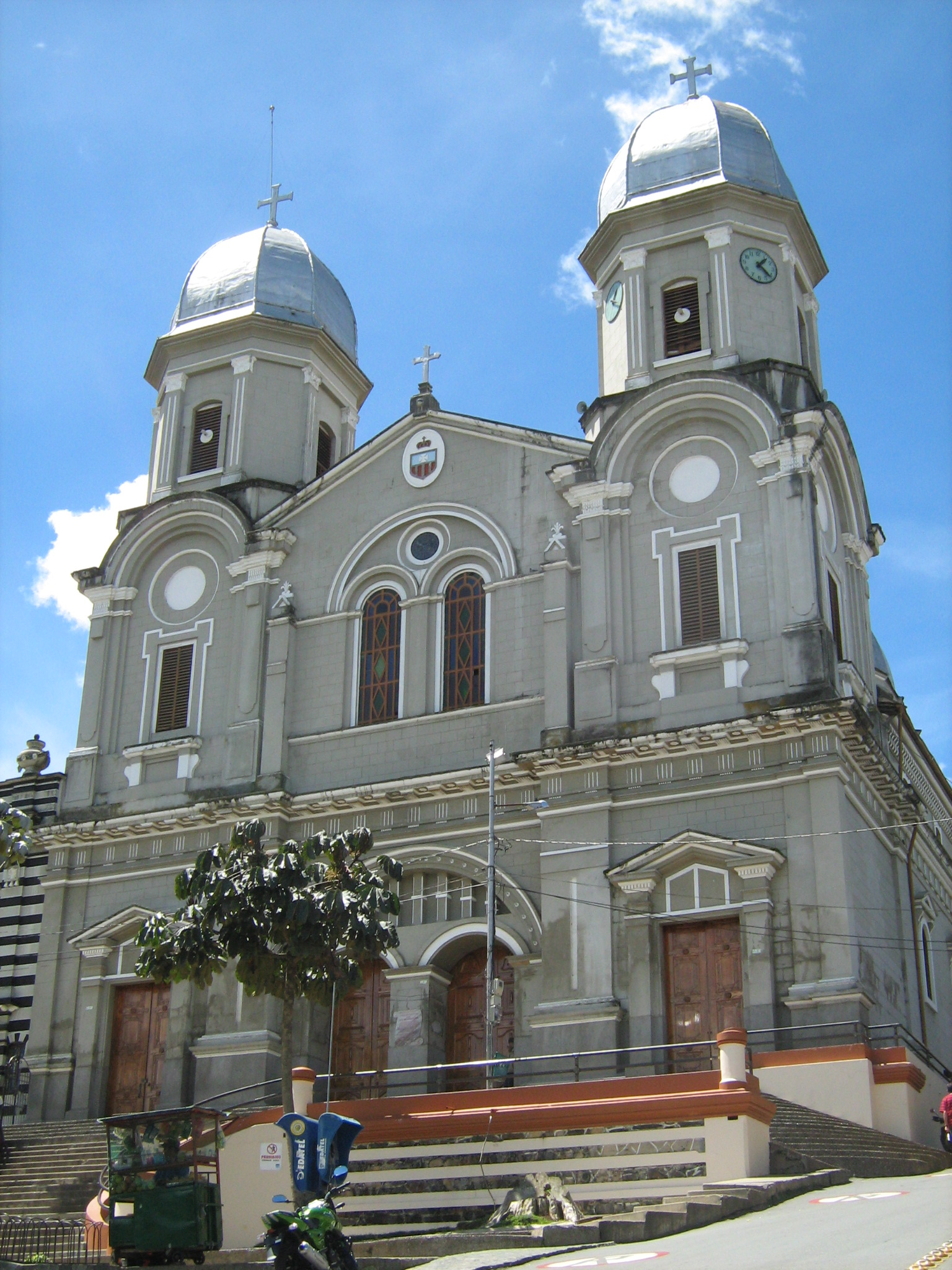
- The front face of the basilica

Religion
- Affiliation: Catholic
- Ecclesiastical or organisational status: Minor basilica
- Patron: Our Lady of Mercy
- Year consecrated: 1944

Location
- Location: 6°57′48″N 75°25′2″W
- Municipality: Yarumal
- Country: Colombia
- Interactive map of Basilica of Our Lady of Mercy
- Administration: Diocese of Santa Rosa de Osos

Architecture
- Architects: José María Zapata; Heliodoro Ochoa (redesigned the primary façade)
- Style: Renaissance Revival
- Groundbreaking: 1861
- Completed: 1944

The Basilica of Our Lady of Mercy (Spanish: Basílica Menor de Nuestra Señora de la Merced) is a minor basilica in Yarumal, Colombia. It belongs to the Diocese of Santa Rosa de Osos and is the seat of the parish of the same name. The basilica is devoted to the Virgin Mary, and the patron saint is the Virgin of Mercy. It is the titular church of Saint Aloysius Gonzaga.

It was designed and built in the Renaissance Revival style as a larger replacement for Yarumal's first church. Begun in 1866, the construction project suffered from multiple difficulties including its enormous cost, the civil wars in the late nineteenth century, its partial collapse in 1890, and an earthquake in 1938. These delayed completion of the church until 1944, at which point it was consecrated. During construction, the Chapel of Saint Aloysius (formerly the cemetery chapel) was made a parish church.

The basilica is rectangular, divided longitudinally into three parts. The main façade is made up of two domed towers joined by the central nave. It is home to several works of art, notably Nuestra Señora de la Merced, a 1798 painting of the Virgin of Mercy that is considered to be miraculous.

In 1998, the Municipal Council of Yarumal declared the basilica and the Chapel of Saint Aloysius a cultural and architectural landmark of the municipality. On 12 August 1999, Pope John Paul II granted the church the title of minor basilica. Since 2000, the church has been home to the remains of the poet Epifanio Mejía, the author of the Himno Antioqueño.

== History ==
The basilica's construction suffered many setbacks. The devastation of the Colombian civil wars in the late nineteenth century, the large scale of the project and its high cost, the partial collapse of a part of the structure in 1890, and an earthquake in 1938 all caused construction to last more than eighty years.

=== 19th century ===
Yarumal square in 1831

Yarumal, originally named Saint Luis of Góngora, was founded in 1787. From the beginning it had a straw chapel, where the priests from Santa Rosa de Osos held religious ceremonies that were sporadically attended by the new population. In 1790, the parish of Saint Luis of Góngora was established (now the parish of Our Lady of Mercy).

By 1850, it was obvious that a larger church needed to be built, as the town had 3,000 inhabitants and the old building was too small. On 20 December 1860, Father Julián Palacio gathered the townspeople in the square, informed them of this need, and urged them to provide all the help they could. He then formed the first committee to begin work on the church.

In a meeting held on 15 January 1861, Father Julián Palacio suggested that they begin work on the church in April of the same year. In the same meeting, he authorised the first purchase of boards for the rammed earth walls so that they would be dry when they went into use.

As it was a large project, people soon began to offer their services to work on the church. On 5 February 1861, Gregorio Álvarez offered his services as bricklayer and director of the work for two reals and three pesos a day. On the sixth of this month, Father Julián Palacio planted the first stone and began to raise funds.

Meanwhile, a request was filed for the bishop from the Diocese of Antioquia to authorize construction. On 2 March 1861, the townspeople received a message back, providing the license for the new church. The bishop urged the committee to be as organized as possible so that construction would proceed smoothly, and so the board drafted seven chapters of regulations.

The work was financed by alms, collections, mandatory contributions, raffles, bazaars, and the sale of farms that some benefactors had donated to the Church.

On 4 July 1865, Santos Sánchez offered his services to direct the architecture and masonry work for five pesos a day, but was not approved. On this same date, a meeting was scheduled with Policarpo Rivera to make an offer to buy land with the intention of establishing a factory to supply tiles for construction. Rivera donated this land for free, as well as the rights to build a shed and use the mud, with the only condition that the land be returned when construction was finished. Around this same time, the committee hired work from some Lime kilns in the Sepultura villages. (Note: The Sepulturas was a rural zone of Yarumal that currently is located between the villages of El Cedro and Cedeño.)

On 25 August of the same year, José María Zapata Muñoz was hired to direct the architecture and masonry work, at a rate of four pesos a day, with the agreement that he would also provide paintings and statues. Four years later he was joined by Floro Hernández, and on 18 July 1869, by Francisco Arroyave and Francisco Puerta.

On 2 April 1866, demolition of the old church was begun by Gregorio Álvarez. The land beneath the former church belonged to the parish and was adjacent to land belonging to the municipality, located north of Bolivar Square (today Epifanio Mejía park). Neither area had precisely defined limits. Much later, both parties came to an agreement to demarcate the properties.

On the same day the former church was demolished, Father Julián Palacio sent an official letter to the judicial vicar, Valerio Antonio Jiménez, which explained the need to demolish the former church in order to build the new one, and requested permission to build the Chapel of Our Lady of Carmen (now known as the Chapel of Saint Aloysius). (Note: The old cemetery was located two blocks west of the main park, next to the chapel which is now called the Chapel of Saint Aloysius. As the town grew, the cemetery needed to be moved to the outskirts.) The license for this arrived from Marinilla on 17 April 1866.

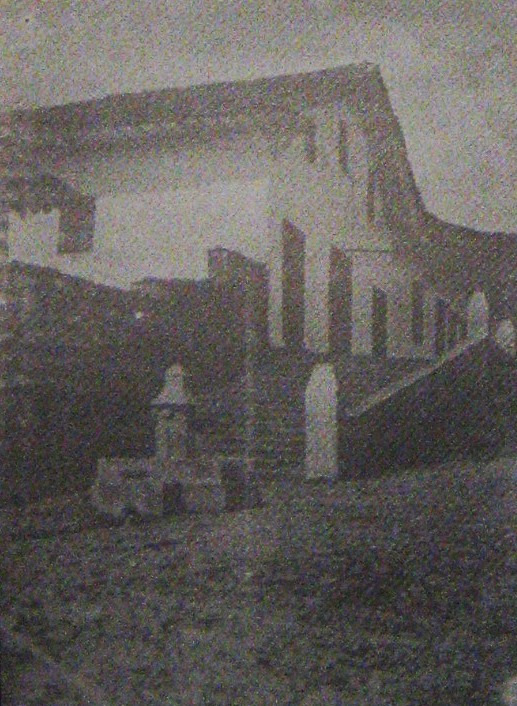
The old cemetery chapel, best known as the Chapel of Saint Luis, formerly named the Chapel of Our Lady of Carmen. It is often considered to be the first chapel in Yarumal, though this is not true. (Note: As the church of Our Lady of Mercy was under construction for more than 80 years, many generations born and died while the Chapel of Saint Aloysius was the parish church. This causes some people to mistakenly believe that the Chapel was the first church in Yarumal.)

On 1 July 1866, the Julián Palacio sent a request to the Ecclesiastical Government, explaining that as the former church had been demolished, the cemetery chapel needed to be expanded. Initially the former cemetery lot was to be sold to finance the new cemetery, but the villagers were enthusiastic to expand the chapel, and proposed that the money be used to buy the land in front of the chapel to form a small square. The application was approved by Monsignor Valerio Antonio Jiménez.

On 14 February 1868, Pope Pius IX ordered the seat of the Diocese of Antioquia, which had operated there since 1828, to be moved to Medellín under the new name Diocese of Medellín and Antioquia. The parish of Yarumal remained under its ecclesiastical jurisdiction.

With the chapel expanded and remodeled, Julián Palacio requested and was approved by Bishop José Joaquín Isaza Ruíz to bless the chapel where Mass was being held, since the main church was not yet finished.

On 4 February 1873, the Diocese of Antioquia was restored, and the parish of Yarumal was returned to its jurisdiction. The seat in Medellín returned to simply being called the Diocese of Medellín.

In 1876, construction was forced to a halt by the political–religious civil war from 1876 to 1877. On 1 September 1881, the board decided to restart the work on the church. They contacted architect José María Zapata to begin on 1 December, and hired Manuel Antonio Misas to provide six thousand bricks for 38 pesos. However, Misas and the board had their differences, and the agreement was canceled, with the board paying a fine of 24 pesos to avoid legal action.

José María Zapata arrived in Yarumal from Medellín in the first week of December 1881 to take charge of the project, fulfilling his agreement with the board and with Father Aldemar Palacio (priest from 26 September 1875 to 5 August 1895).

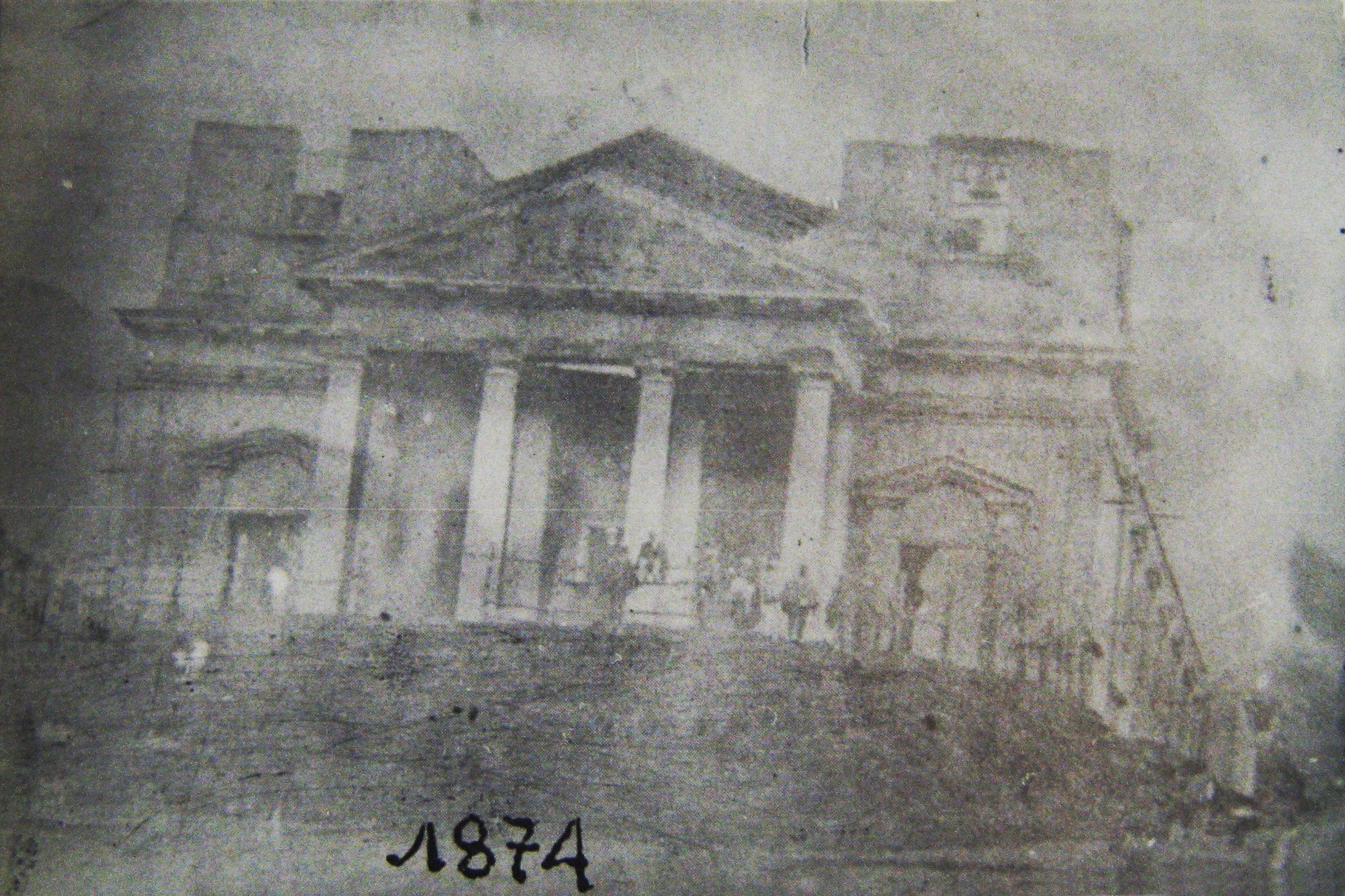
The Temple of Our Lady of Mercy in 1874. Note the portico, topped by a classical pediment, which collapsed in 1890 and had to be completely removed from the design.

In June 1884, priest Uladislao Ortiz and Marco A. Mejía, sent the board a letter in which they requested approval to begin building the right tower of the church, without affecting the work being carried out within. They were approved to give 3,000 pesos, which was the approximate cost of the tower.

This date marked the beginning of many problems, with construction constantly starting and stopping for reasons including more unrest, lack of finances, and the urgency of building a bridge over the Nechí River to join Medellín and the neighbouring villages.

On 18 June 1889, when one of the sacristies was already finished, Bishop Jesús María Rodríguez authorised the priest to celebrate Mass and administer the Sacrament of Penance in the church while it was under construction. During the pastoral visit on 17 August of the same year he ordered work to resume. He also approved the oratory, and allowed religious functions to continue while construction concluded. (Note: The oratory is the current reserve altar where the painting of Mary Help of Christians is found.)

On 25 January 1890, the work was again stopped, this time because senior officer Ricardo Pérez and architect Zapata retired without prior notice. Several days later, José María Zapata Muñoz resigned as the director of construction, and on 6 February of the same year the portico and the dome of the temple collapsed while under construction. In a meeting on 15 February, the board accepted Zapata's resignation. They believed the collapse was possibly due to two causes: structural issues with the design, or to the interruptions in work contributing to unsteadiness in the construction.

This misfortune was not received well by the community, who blamed those in charge of the project. Following these complaints, the board called a public meeting on 17 February 1890 in which all members resigned, leaving the public free to elect new and more able members. The village people responded to this by urging the board not resign, after which the members decided to retain their positions. The board met two days later to evaluate the situation and find an architect to examine the construction, determine what needed to be demolished, and be placed in charge of the work. Zapata never returned to Yarumal.

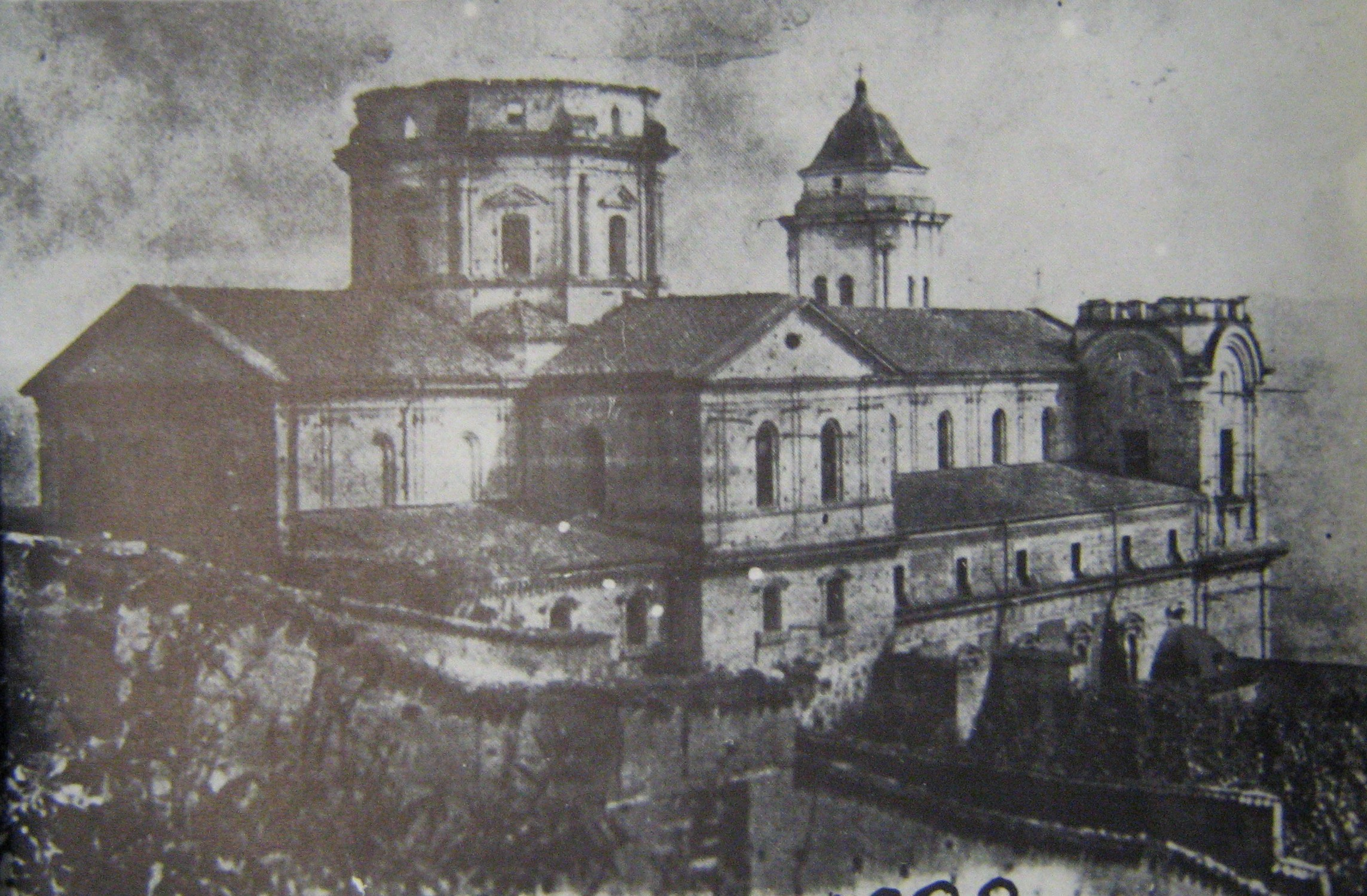
View of the church in 1892. The dome had collapsed in January 1890, together with the pillars that supported it, and its reconstruction only progressed so far as the tholobate seen in this image. The finished tower is different from the pictured one, which afterwards presented structural problems.

The frame of the church was designed by Victoriano Palacio, and reviewed on 21 May 1894 by Tomás Vásquez, who found it satisfactory. However, because of the earlier collapse, the board resolved to have the project examined by an engineer. Until it was approved, all carpentry was to remain suspended. In the meantime, they focused on work on the tower. Heliodoro Medina was the authorized to find said engineer, and he hired Heliodoro Ochoa to review the project. On 10 August 1894, a well-attended meeting was held. The engineer recommended not building the portico because of his concerns regarding its stability. The board and townspeople agreed that the portico not be built, and hired Ochoa to design the front face of the building.

Ochoa later suggested that the rear of the church be roofed in wood, instead of the original stone dome. This proposal was approved by majority vote. After this, Ochoa examined the previous construction and found the carpentry and masonry work to be stable.

But not all news was positive. On 21 February 1895, the work was once again stopped due to lack of funds and difficulties collecting them. The only ones who continued to work—although at half speed—were the masons, with goal of storing the materials until work was restarted. On the same date, all members of the board were asked to resign. Beginning on 4 August 1895, the work on the temple remained practically paralysed. Funds had run out, and left with no alternative, the board ordered the church be condemned on 12 October 1895.

After seeing the state of the building, Father Ildefonso Tirado began to hold religious ceremonies in the new church on 11 May 1899 to try to encourage the population to donate. The Thousand Days War, one of Colombia's bloodiest civil wars, began that year.

=== 20th century ===
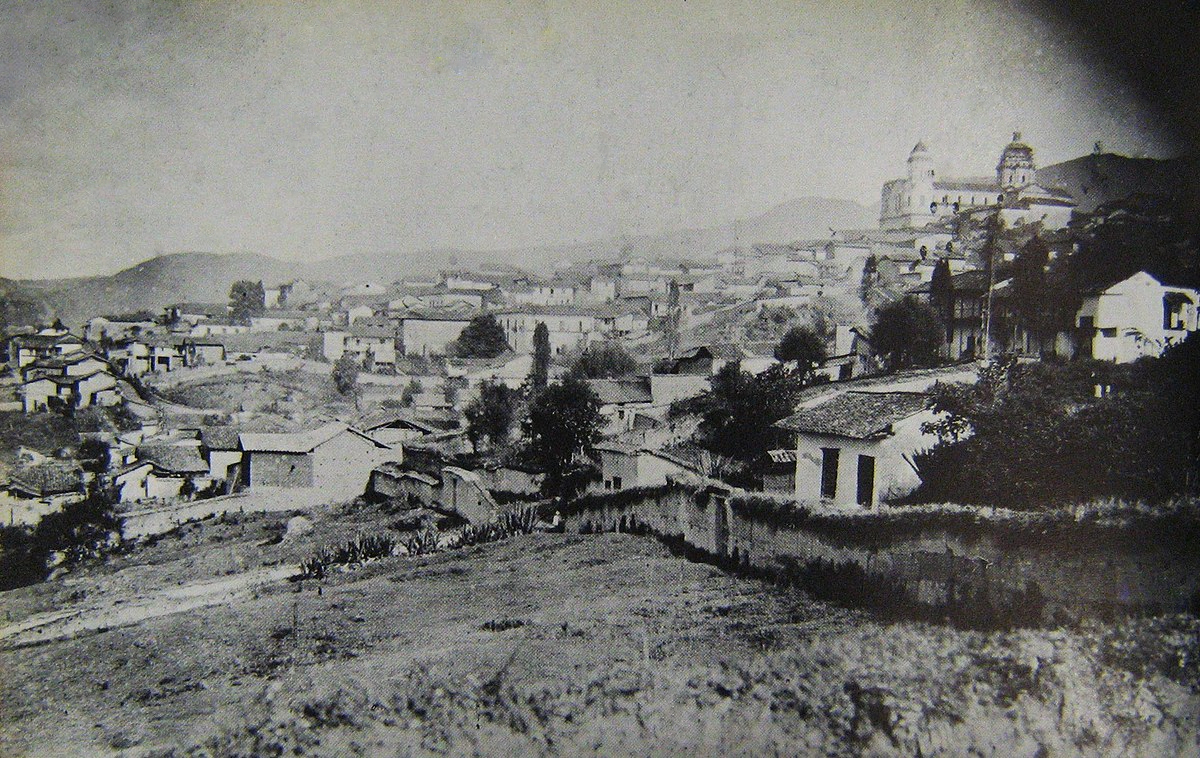
Photograph of Yarumal in 1900. The basilica is the dominant building in the landscape, a characteristic that remains to this day.

The 20th century seemed to begin with better luck. In February 1900, they began to build wooden grilles for the stained glass windows of the church. On 27 December of the same year, the Board authorised Díaz to begin work on the bell tower. On 15 February 1901, construction began on the wooden side doors; work on the main door did not begin until 20 July 1903. On 20 May 1901, the Daughters of María congregation installed the altar of the Immaculate Conception that they had commissioned with the board's approval in 1898. Heliodoro Ochoa was brought back to Yarumal from Medellín to continue his work, and along with Juan Nepomuceno Gómez, worked on to create the latches for the bell tower and buildings. On 22 July 1901, Victoriano Palacio was chosen to direct the tiling of the church.

The works were again stalled until July 1903, when they were once again resumed due to the Bishop of Antioquia, Manuel Antonio López de Mesa, visiting nearby. By this time, Victoriano Palacio had been commissioned to install the altar, work on the moulding around the door in the chancel, create two holy water fonts, and build the bell tower. However, the bishop realized that they had resumed construction only because he was there, and he was hurt to learn that work on the church had otherwise been paralysed. He blamed this in part on the war, but placed some of the blame on the board members. As a result, he decided to remove all members of the board and appoint an entirely new board. He also was quick to recognise that Yarumal needed two churches due to its population and importance, and ordered the newly established board to not only focus on work on the new church, but also on maintenance of the cemetery chapel.

The dome, according to Ochoa's calculations, needed a total of 210 large planks and 700 small ones, as well as 12 hundredweights of copper and 2 of tin. On 22 November the board approved the proposal from José María Hoyos to install a temporary altar with the image of Saint Joseph in one of the side naves.

On 6 January 1906, it was discussed and agreed upon that the tiling of the building would be started. In this same meeting, Carlos Mejía Vargas, backed by other doctors, said that due to health concerns, all religious ceremonies should be moved to the chapel in the old cemetery, and the priest agreed.

In June 1908 the effects of the cheap materials became evident. As one of the towers began to suffer from structural problems, Ochoa was called upon. He responded from Medellín with some advice to repair the tower: primarily, to reinforce it with wood. Ochoa arrived in Yarumal on 24 December and visited the construction site of the church with the full board. The Board followed all the recommendations, except those suggesting the bells be taken down, believing that the changes that had been made in the tower provided sufficient support.

On 21 April 1914, priest Leónidas Lopera Roldán ordered construction to begin on the atrium under the direction of José López and Jesús María Saldarriaga, and with designs by Joaquín Pinillos. The following year, Roldán commissioned the altar, which for many years served as the main altar, from craftsmen in Carvajal.

On 5 February 1917, Pope Benedict XV issued the papal bull Quod catholicae, which created the Diocese of Santa Rosa de Osos, splitting the former territory of the Diocese of Antioquia. After this, the Yarumal parish became a part of the new episcopal seat.

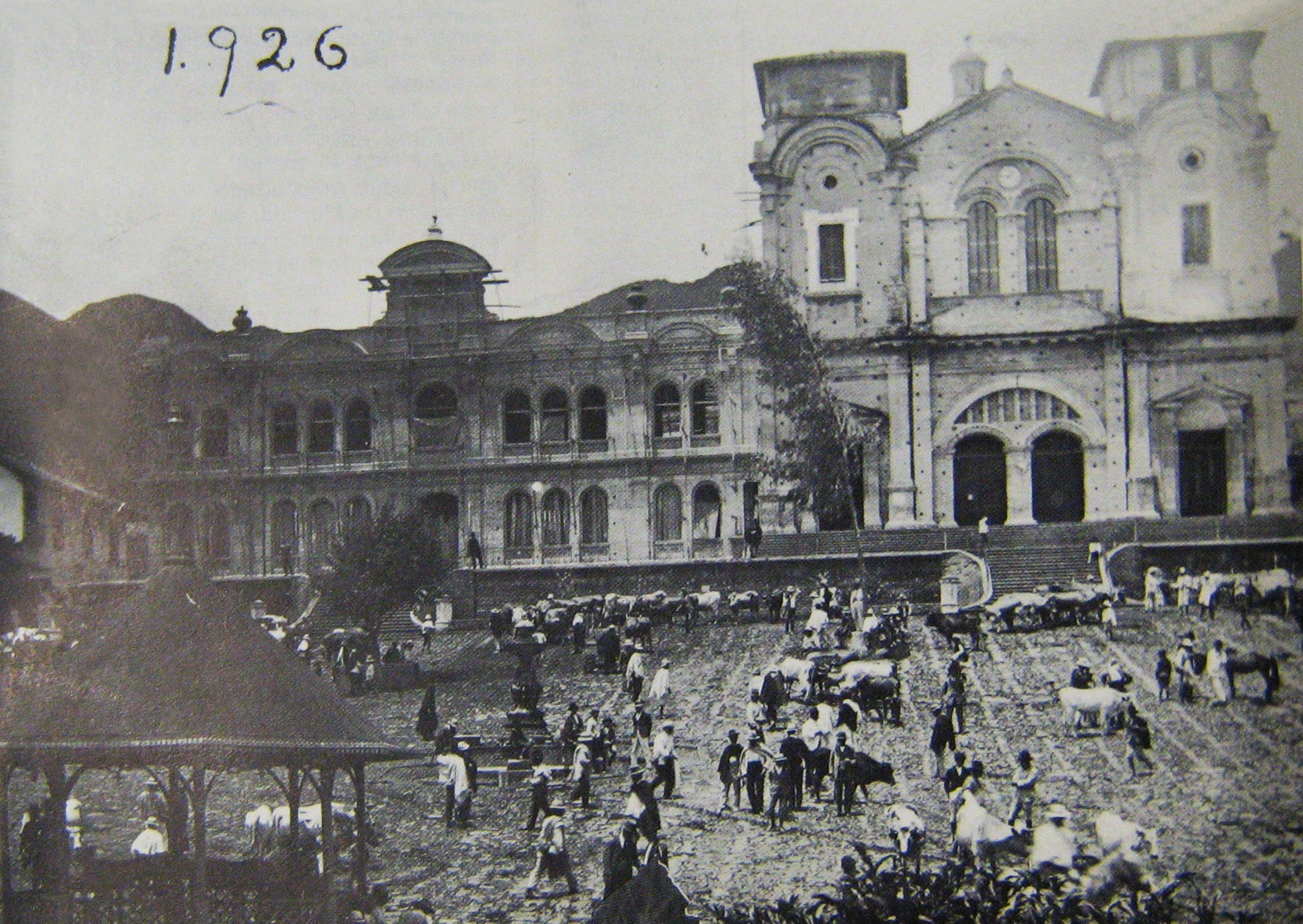
Yarumal Square, on Thursday of the fair of 1926, with a wooden gazebo and water fountain. The third part of the tower on the right had been demolished because of structural problems, leaving both towers unfinished. The clock from 1882 is located in the circular area between the windows in the central door, after initially in being placed in the right tower.

In the night of 4 February 1938, an earthquake caused serious damage to the church. The walls were damaged, the foundation of the main arch in the central nave settled, and cracks formed in the apse. Father Gerardo Martínez Madrigal immediately requested technical advice from architects and engineers, who visited to inspect and undertake photographic studies. The evaluations produced very different results. Some suggested that they reinforce the walls with strips of iron, others suggested they should demolish the severely damaged portions and build a new concrete arch supported by new columns. The pastor chose to make the repairs suggested by Jesús Mejía, which involved rebuilding damaged portions brick by brick.

When repairs were finished, Bishop Miguel Ángel Builes consecrated the Church of Our Lady of Mercy on 11 February 1944.

In 1947, Father Francisco Gallego Pérez purchased by the first organ for the church, a Hammond organ for 7,000 pesos. It was delivered on 16 July, and was blessed on 14 September.

Efraím Jiménez, the priest from 9 March 1953 to 24 March 1968, hired Raúl Bohórquez to decorate the towers of the temple with nickel silver. Jiménez also obtained the current marble altar, which was consecrated on 7 June 1955 by Builes. He also bought the current church organ from Walcker Orgelbau of Ludwigsburg, Germany for 102,000 pesos. The Hammond organ was sold for 25,000 pesos to the Chapel of the Theological Seminary of Santa Rosa de Osos.

Meanwhile, the cemetery chapel began to deteriorate; in 1992 Father Luis Enrique Restrepo Muñoz established a board to work to restore it as a historical site.

On 23 November 1998, the municipal council of Yarumal declared the Church of Our Lady of Mercy, along with the Chapel of Saint Luis, to be architectural landmarks. On 12 August 1999, under the leadership of Father Gilberto Melguizo Yepes, the temple was given the title of Lower Basilica. The consecration was performed in a ceremony chaired by the bishop of Santa Rosa de Osos, Jairo Jaramillo Monsalve.

Yepes also ordered the replacement of a church lamp that had fallen, and obtained the stained glass windows, three new bells, a new baptismal font, and the picture of Blessed Mariano of Jesús Euse Hoyos. He restored marble tiles in the temple, which were in terrible condition. Additionally, in an initiative by Yepes and the Municipal Council of Culture, in August 2000 the remains of poet Epifanio Mejía were moved from the San Pedro Cemetery in Medellín to the Basilica. The gravestone was designed by Martín Villegas Alzate of Yarumal.

== Urban context ==
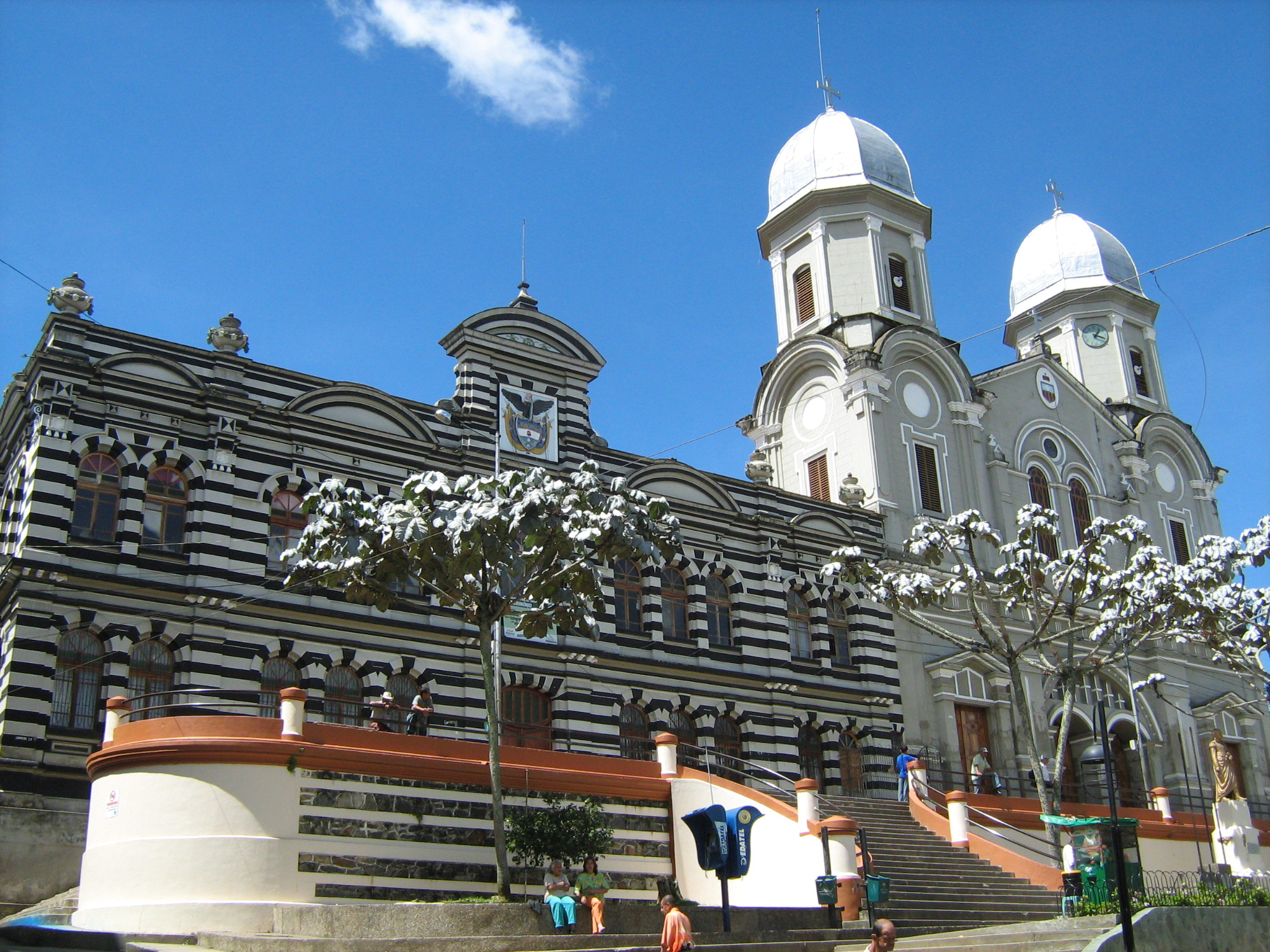
Rosenda Torres School, designed by Belgian architect Agustín Goovaerts, and the Basilica of Our Lady of Mercy

The basilica is located on the north side of the Epifanio Mejía Park in "The Centre" neighbourhood. This park is filled with historical and cultural symbols, and is the primary location for religious and civic activities. It was previously called Bolívar Square in memory of Simón Bolívar, but it was renamed after the renowned poet and the composer of the Himno Antioqueño, Epifanio Mejía, whose remains rest in the church.

Yarumal has three urban parishes: Our Lady of Mercy, La Inmaculada, and El Carmen. It is also home to four rural parishes: Cedeño, Ochalí, El Cedro, and Llanos de Cuivá. The primary part of Yarumal contains few buildings taller than five stories, so the church is the dominant structure in the skyline, and is an easily identifiable landmark. Standing out next to the basilica is the Rosenda Torres School, a building designed by Belgian architect Agustín Goovaerts, as well as the municipal palace and some other architecturally striking buildings.

== Building characteristics ==
The basilica was built in the Renaissance Revival style, a historicist style primarily developed in the 19th and 20th centuries intended to recall the architecture of the past. The building has a rectangular floor plan, with clearly defined spaces. It has three longitudinal naves (the main, and the two lateral), which are crossed by a transept that projects somewhat from the sides but does not form a cruciform. The intersection of the transept and the central nave forms the crossing on which the dome rests.

=== Exterior ===
The layout and composition of the interior of the church is clearly identifiable from the outside of the building. Only the main façade and the eastern side are visible from public areas, as the rectory is in the rear of the church and on the western side is the School of Rosenda Torres, but none of these buildings surpasses the church in height.

The main façade directly faces Park of Epifanio Mejía. It is totally symmetrical, made up of two domed towers joined by a section that frames the central nave. It has three entrances, the central and two on the sides, each one coinciding with a nave.

From the side, the tower is visible, followed by the long sides of the naves (with the lateral naves lower in height than the central one), then the transept wall at the same height as the central nave. On top of the transept is the dome, and after that the walls continue. This façade has an entry that allows direct access to the rightmost nave.

The roof of the church is tiled in clay. The roofs on the central nave and transept are gabled, whereas the lateral naves have roofs with a single slope.

=== Interior ===
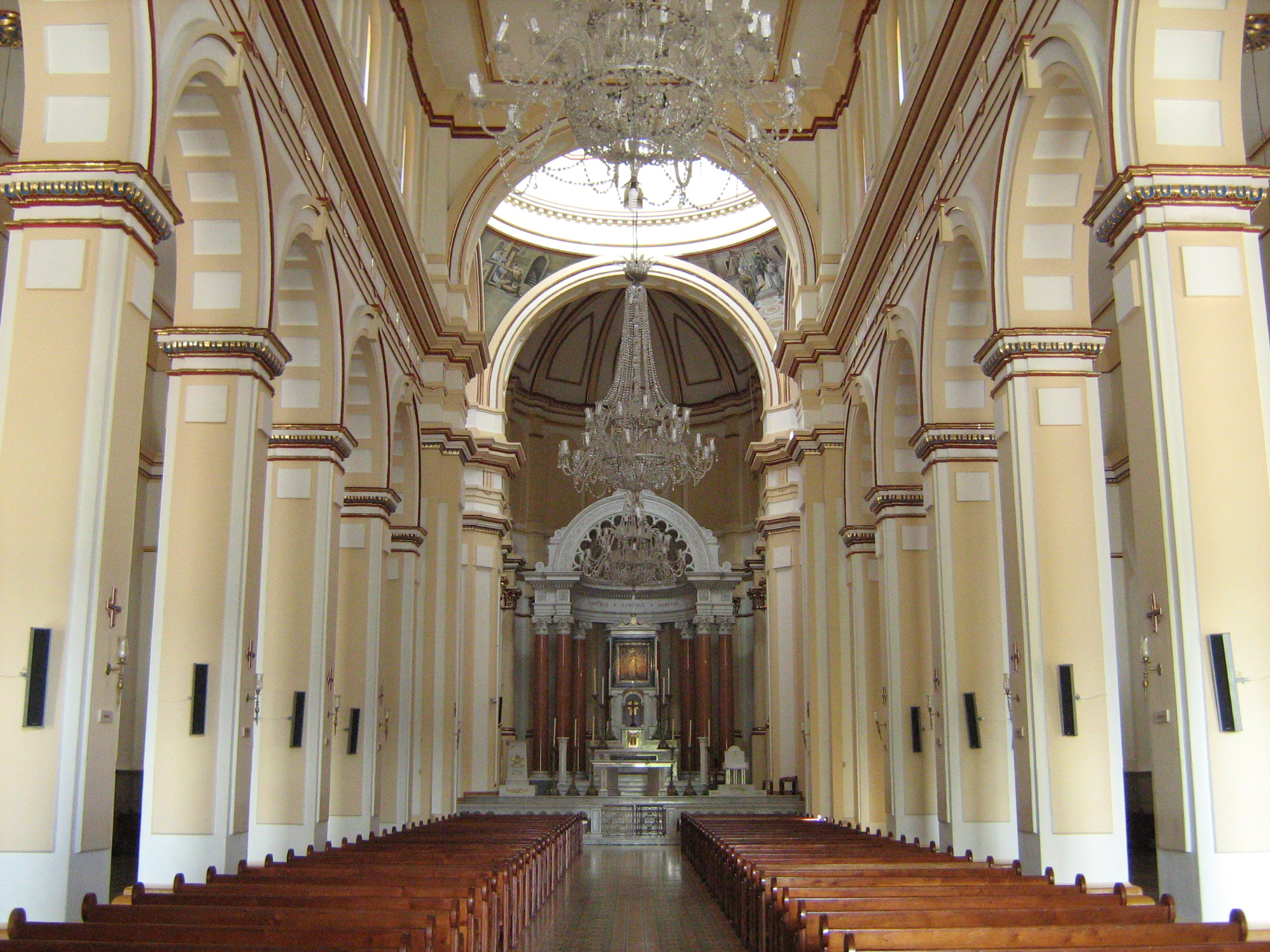
Central nave

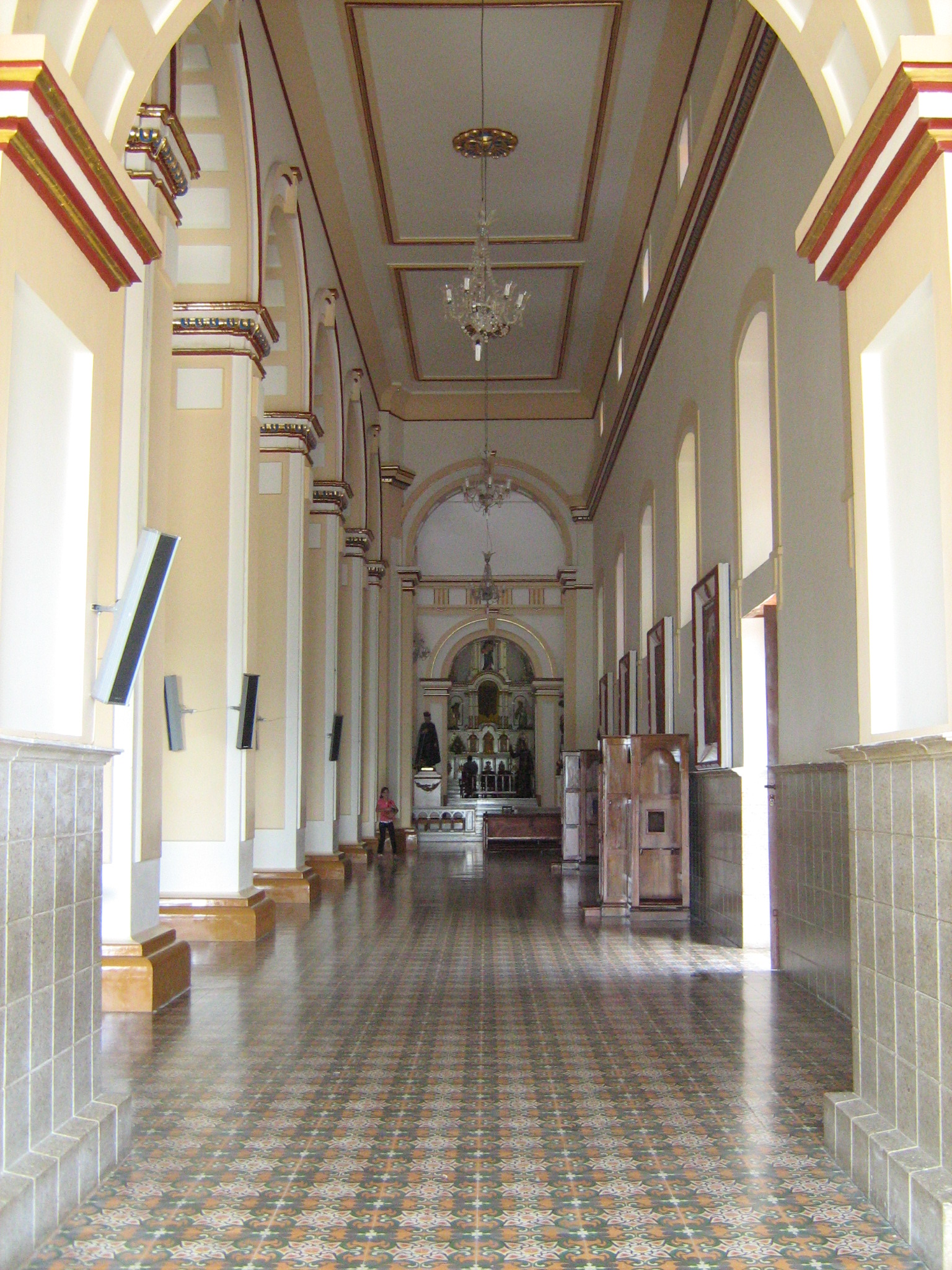
Rightmost nave

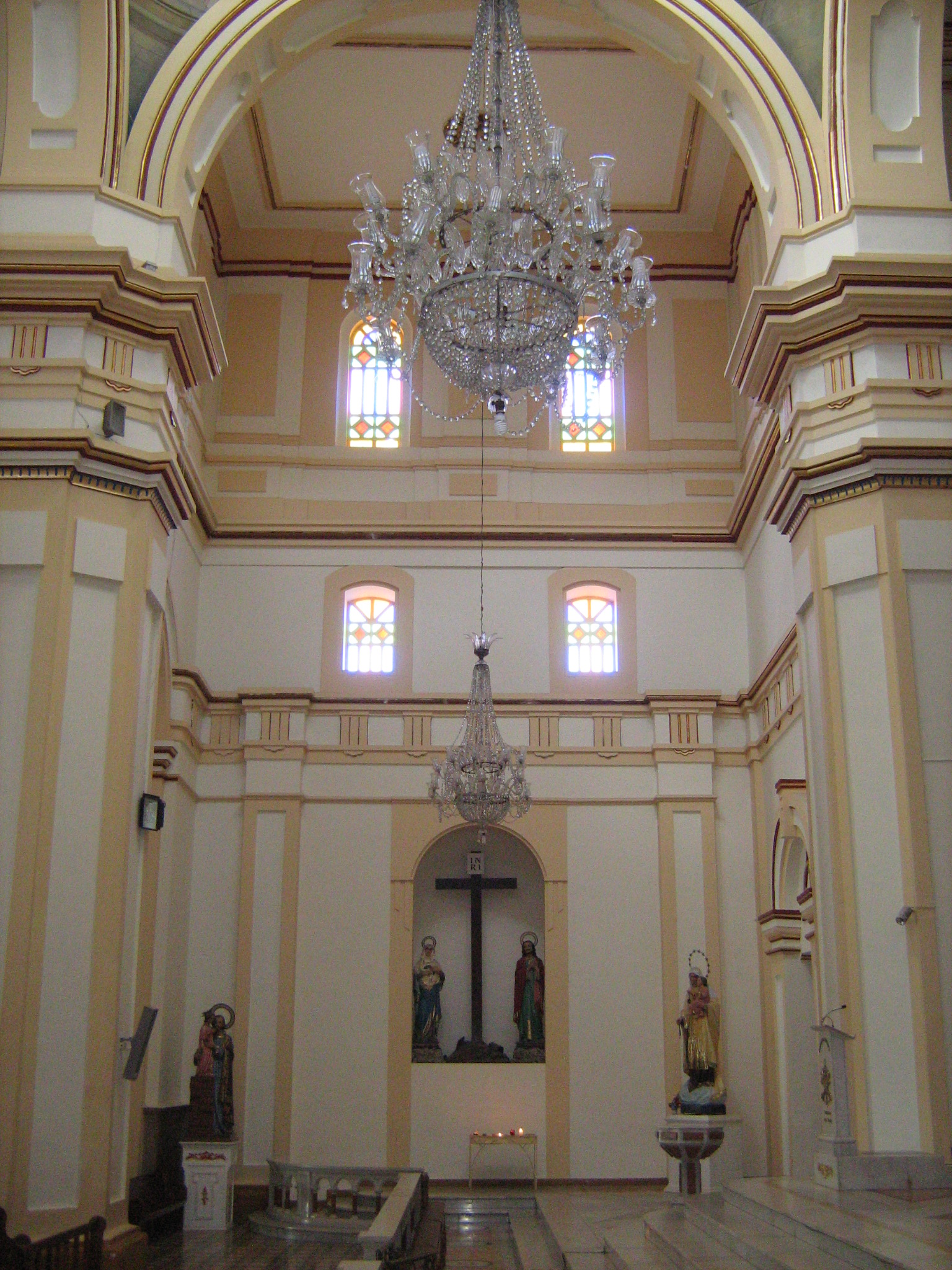
The western section of the transept

At the beginning of the church, which are before or in the beginning sections of the naves, there are two areas under the towers, as well as the area beneath the choir loft. These three areas are separated by walls, and are not designed as is usual in churches, where the towers of the façade are in line with the lateral naves. In area below the choir loft there are four paintings of the Stations of the Cross, and in the areas under the towers there are two more such paintings.

The central nave is considerably wider taller, and is separated laterally, between the choir loft and the sotacoro and the transept, by two arcades on each side, composed of a series of seven pillars each, which are joined by semicircular arches. Said pillars have square bases and are made up of a base, the shaft, and a capital with a cornice on which the arches are supported.

On these arches, in the high part of the central nave, there is a wide and solely decorative entablature. Beside this on each side there are two series of six windows, aligned with the axes of the arches, that allow light into the room. The central nave has a dropped ceiling to hide ceiling structure, on which hang three enormous and striking glass lamps.

The transept area is square, and each side is equally wide as the central nave. In each corner there is a large pillar, which support by means of arches the raised dome with eight windows.

The lateral naves are almost the same length as the central nave. In the external walls they have two series of six windows, each one separated by a decorative cornice. The lower series is of larger and has artistic stained glass. In each side wall there are four paintings of the Stations of the Cross and two wooden confessionals.

In the area south of the side wall there is a door to the church. In the left side wall, also south, the church is attached to the chapel of the Fallen Christ, which then joins at the north with the corridor of ossuaries and at the south with the stairs to the towers and to the high chorus. The lateral naves also have a dropped ceiling to hide the structure, on which hang two glass lamps.

The transept, or transverse nave, projects a bit to the sides though not so much as to form the shape of a Latin cross. It opens in the east–west direction, and has the same width and height of the central nave. The transept comes before the main area of the church, which is highlighted by a marble railing and three tall steps. In addition to this, the area of the transept beside the presbytery there are four other steps, emphasizing the altar area within the church.

In each of the eastern and western walls of the transept, are niches that contain pictures and several windows to provide light. The baptismal font is found in the western section of the transept, and in front of this in the north wall is what seems to have once been an entry, but has been converted into a larger niche that houses a high relief of the baptism of Jesus, and above this is a Chi Rho, a monogram of the name of Christ.

The main areas of the church are the presbytery and the chapel of the reserve altar. Said chapel is located in the end of the right nave. It is a rectangular room, four steps above, which served for much time as the main altar. The presbytery is elevated above the rest of the temple by seven steps; it makes up the main area of the central nave and has a vaulted apse covering it. Inside the presbytery are the altar in a half baldachin, the table of the sacrifice, the seat of the priest, and the ambon, all in marble.

=== Materials and structure ===
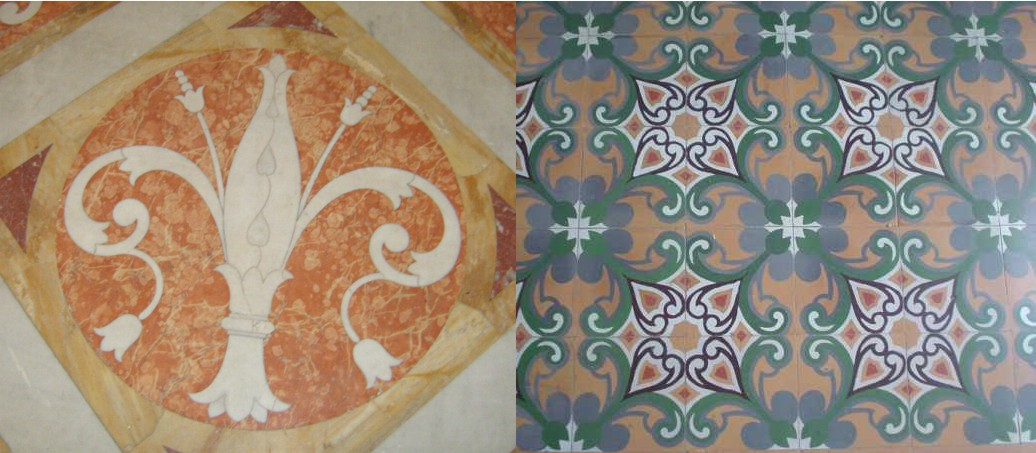
On the left, part of the marble paving of the end wall; on the right, part of the tiling of the naves in coloured cement

Much of the basilica is built in solid brick, and only some sections of the side walls are built in rammed earth. Both materials are plastered as much on the outside as inside, and the plastering of the outside bricks is characterized by the simulation of blocks of different sizes. The bricks were attached with lime mortar, a type of mortar formed of calcium oxide, sand, and water. It dries into a hard substance, but with lower resistance and impermeability than cement. This material was used in the church instead of cement mortar in the beginning of the construction, although when the towers were rebuilt after the earthquake in 1938, cement was used to attach the bricks, as it had become a material that was used in construction in Colombia.

Structurally the façades work like load-bearing walls that transmit all the weight to the foundation, and those in turn to the ground. The walls measure on average of 80 cm in thickness, and the square-based pillars of the naves are 100 cm on each side. The foundation was made in stone supported with brick.

The roof of the temple is made of a wooden structure covered with clay tiles. The cylinder of the main dome is built in brick; the rest is a wooden structure covered in copper plates. The tower domes also are built with a wooden structure covered in copper plates, but these plates appear silver on the outside.

The tiling of the presbytery and of the reserve altar, in other words the walls of the church, is in multicoloured marble. Its design is similar to that of the Church of Nuestra Señora del Rosario, with marble inlays combined with drawings of fleurs-de-lis, except the terraces which in the basilica are made of white marble. The paving of the naves is done with coloured cement (also known as hydraulic tile), which has striking forms and colours. This type of tiling was very common between the beginning and middle of the 20th century.

In the period of time when Gilberto Melguizo Yepes was the parish priest, the marble tiling was restored, as it had settled and sunk. To stabilise it, affected parts were injected with grout. Afterwards the paving was polished, giving it back all his splendour.

== Elements ==
The basilica has several elements that stand out, whether for their design, function, material, or historical value.

=== Picture of the Virgin of Mercy ===
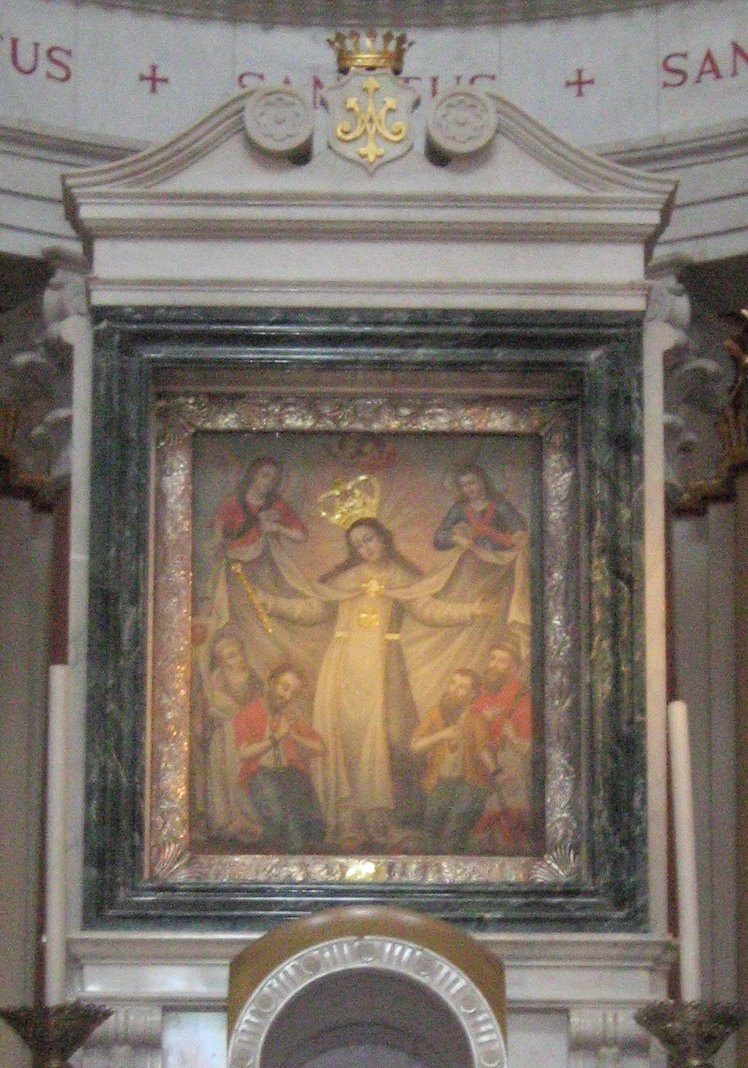
Picture of the Virgin of the Mercy, painted around the time of the foundation of Yarumal in 1789, associated with the Quito School. In this image, which is considered miraculous, the Virgin de los cautivos (Virgin of the captives) protects under her mantle, held up by two angels, two pious changed captives who pray and plead in front of her. Behind them, a level above, two religious men. The golden crown was added in 1942.

The veneration of the Virgin of Mercy in Yarumal dates back to when the municipality was founded. According to the records of the approval of the establishment of San Luis de Góngora, issued from Medellín on 21 December 1787 by Visitor Juan Antonio Mon y Velarde from the Province of Antioquia, the colonists were devoted to the Virgin of Mercy, and proclaimed it the patron saint and protector.

This text hints that the inhabitants of San Luis de Góngora (today Yarumal) already had some ardour for the Virgin of Mercy, and that they knew of her because of where they were from.

When she was declared the patron saint, the need was evident from the moment the municipality was founded to acquire a picture of her for the early church. Therefore, Nicolás Valencia, a native trader from Rionegro and wealthy colonist along with the secretary of the village mayor judge Francisco Leonín of Estrada, commissioned a painting, which appears to be from a Quiteño painter. Said image was completed in 1789 and donated to the parish.

In 1790, the picture of the Virgin of Mercy was solemnly installed by the Priest of Santa Rosa de Osos, Nicolás Francisco Agudelos, when he visited the chapel of the emerging San Luis of Góngora. On 27 January 1792 the bishop of Popayán, Ángel Velarde y Bustamante, visited Yarumal and confirmed Virgin of Mercy as the patron saint.

In 1915, when Father Leónidas Lopera inaugurated the wooden altar, he retired its ancient frame, and without separating the canvas from its frame, put the image in the upper niche of the altar.

It remained in this condition until 1930, when Father Julio Ortega undertook the cost to buy a new frame and, for the first time, protective glass.

Gerardo Martínez Madrigal was the one who, before the Second Marian Congress in 1942, ensured that the painting of the Virgin of Mercy had a hammered silver frame, manufactured in Santa Fe de Antioquia. He also acquired a shield, filigree brooch, and gold crown, made by Carlos Herrera also in Santa Fe de Antioquia. This cost only 950 pesos for the labour, as the necessary materials were donated by parishioners who gave their jewelry for this purpose.

In total, the work cost 2,000 pesos. The three gold parts weigh a total of 108 grams. The crown contains 24 gemstones and three pearls. There was also great interest in adding shoes and a golden belt Virgin shod and belt of gold. The ore required for this was given to the goldsmith, but no more was heard from him after this.

Priest Martínez was consecrated as bishop of the Roman Catholic Diocese of Garzón in Huila. On 28 August 1942, his successor Father Francisco Galician Pérez removed the painting from its original frame for the first time, with the intention of photographing the picture and transferring it to the new silver frame. It was a great surprised when discovered on the reverse of the painting was the caption: "True portrait of the miraculous image of Our Lady of Mercy, redeemer of captives. A gift of Nicolás Valencia. Year 1789, a Hail Mary by the painter". This confirmed that Valencia was the one who commissioned the image.

In the Second Marian Congress in Yarumal, on 23 September 1942, in the atrium of the chapel of San Francisco, the bishop of Santa Rosa de Osos, Miguel Ángel Builes, blessed the jewels (crown, shield and gold brooch) that were then fixed to the canvas. The picture of the Virgin of Mercy was carried solemnly to the parish church and placed in the niche of honour, in the wooden altar from 1915. To protect the jewels, 3 millimetres (0.12 in) glass was installed, costing 70 pesos.

The 11.5 kilograms of silver that make up the frame was donated by the women of Yarumal. In the top part, it shows shield of the Virgin of Mercy, and in the bottom, in gold, "The parish of Yarumal of its exalted patron saint in the Second Marian Congress".

In 1987 during the bicentennial of the foundation of Yarumal, the painting was canonically crowned by the Diocese of Santa Rosa de Osos, and also received the title of "Perpetual Mayor of Yarumal". In 1998, in an initiative by Monsignor Gilberto Melguizo Yepes, a belt and gold sceptre were placed on the image.

There are other versions or legends of the origin of the painting that are false, as they have inconsistencies and lack historical sources. One of the most widespread versions tells that traveler from Medellín arrived in Yarumal offering for sale the canvas of the Virgin of Mercy. Not able to sell it, he left it with the "Contento" inn (where today the Seminary of the Missions of Yarumal is located) and never returned for it, so the parish took it under their protection. This legend is contrary to the historical facts, as the painting is mentioned in the documents from the first ecclesiastical visits as being in the early church of San Luis de Góngora. Furthermore, this version is inconsistent with the caption on the reverse of the picture.

=== Altar ===
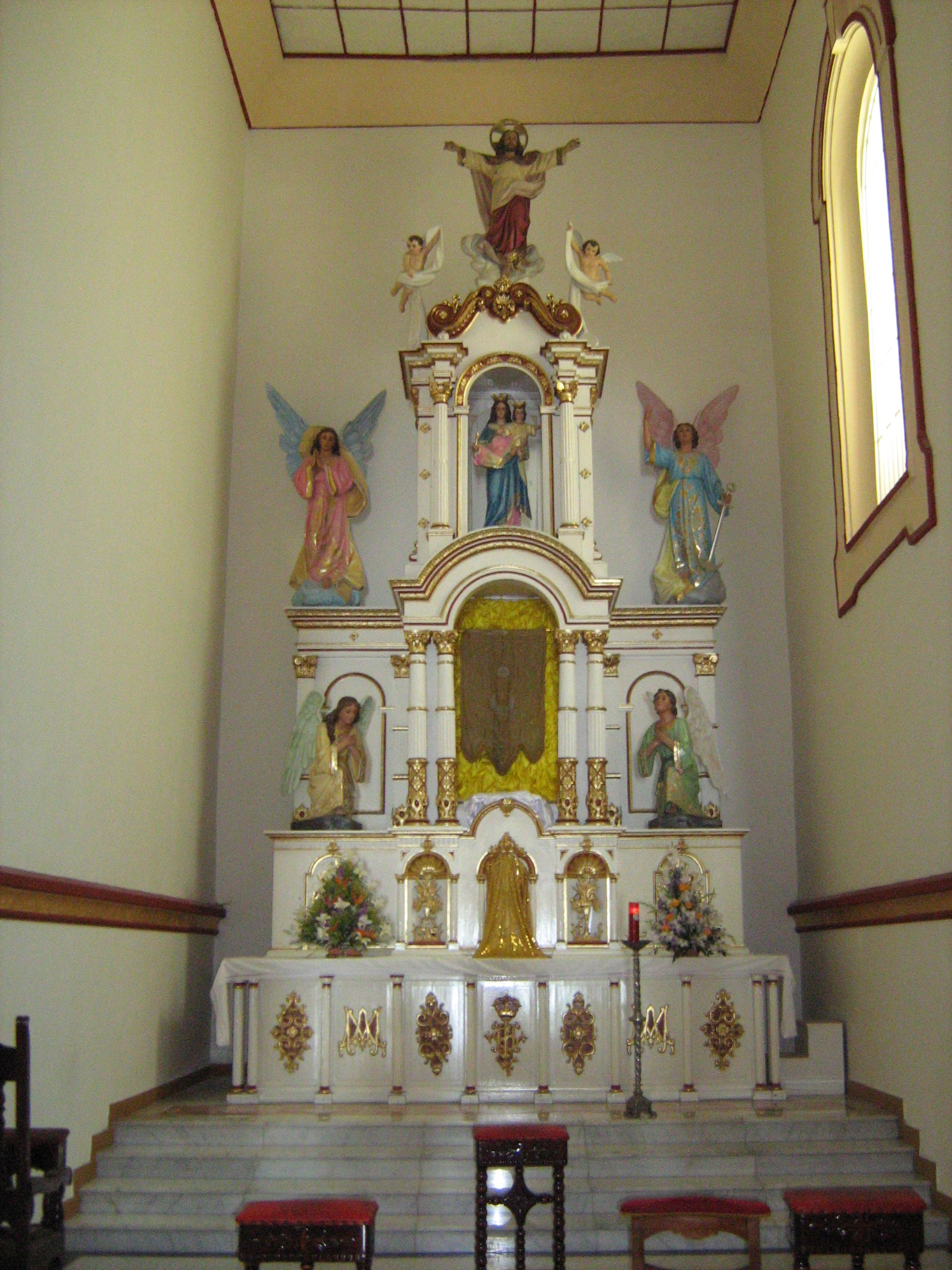
The rightmost altar, also called the reserve altar, was made by the cabinetmakers from Carvajal in 1915 and used for a long time as the primary altar

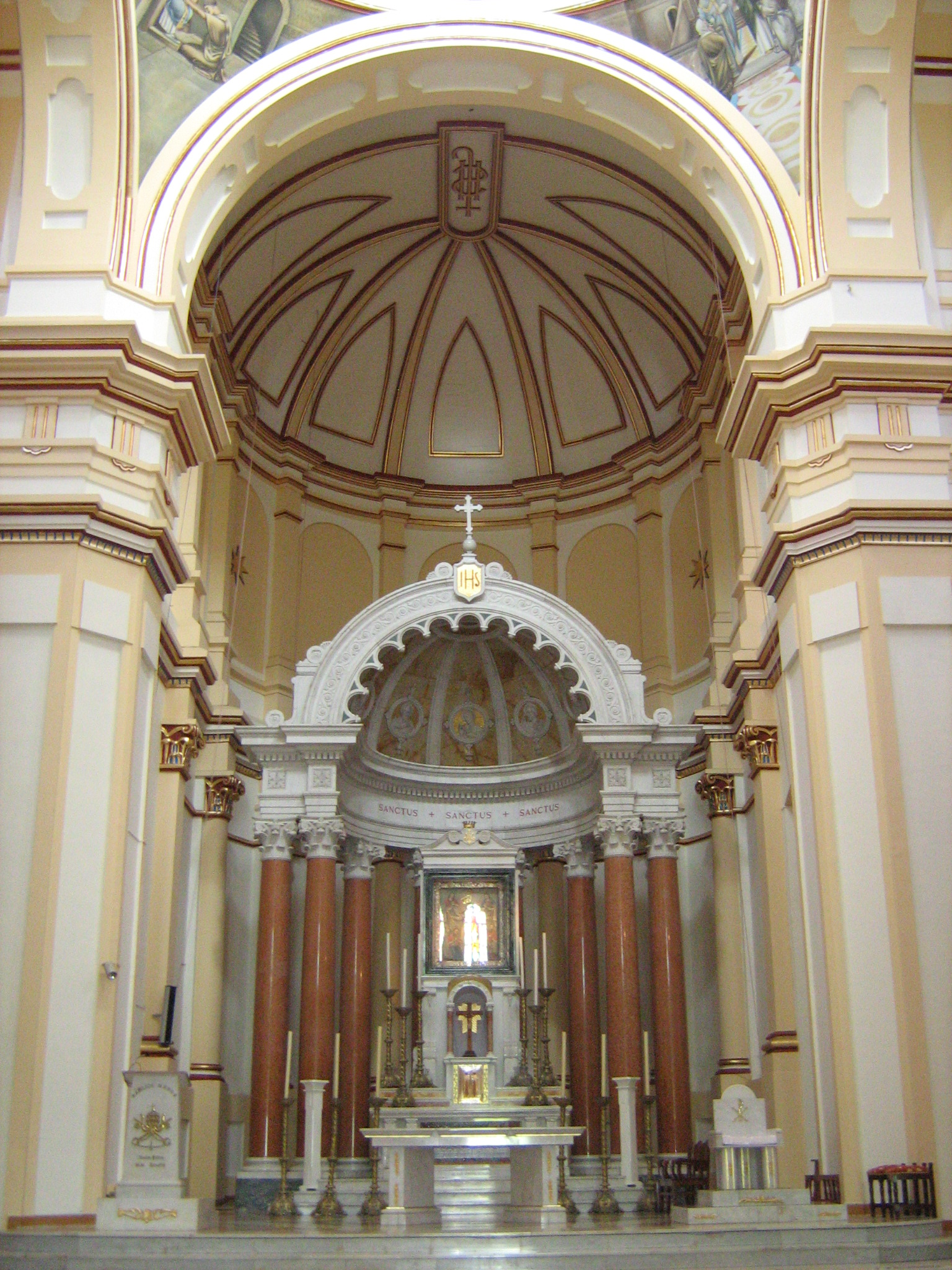
Vaulted apse which houses the marble altar

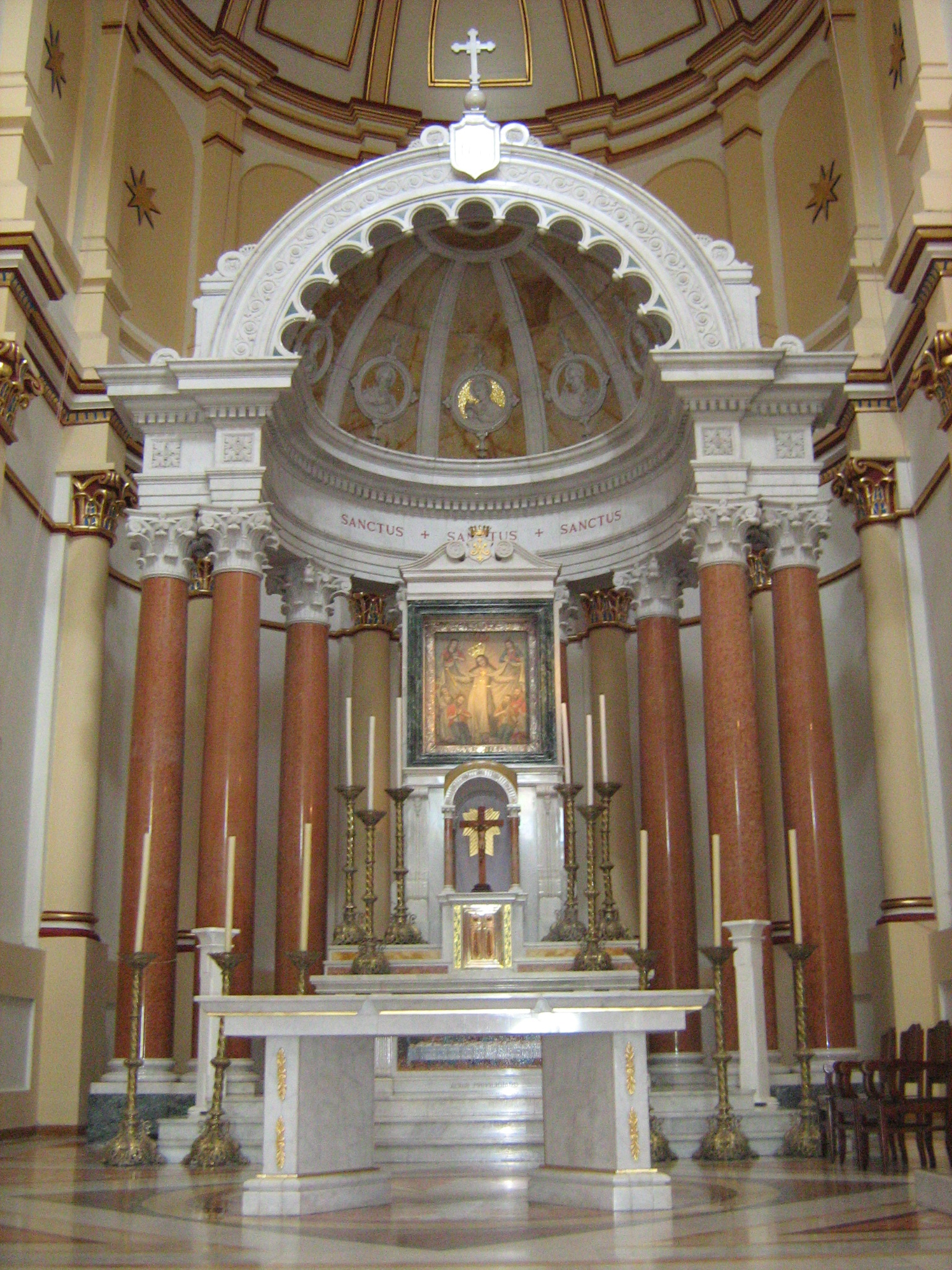
The shrine of the altar was consecrated on 8 June 1955. Made in Italy from marble, it is 12 metres high, 7 metres wide, and weighs 70 tonnes.

The first altar built for the church was the one donated by the congregation of the Salesian Sisters of Don Bosco, for the veneration of the Immaculate Conception. The church board authorised this association with the other congregation in 1898, and ordered its construction. It was installed on 20 May 1901.

In 1915, Priest Leónidas Lopera commissioned an altar from the cabinetmakers in Carvajal, which for a long time served as the primary altar. The chapel of the patron saint was so small that it was necessary to place the picture outside of the niche so that it could be seen by all. Some time afterwards, it was decided to build a new altar in marble for the Marian year of 1954.

To decide which company would create the altar, the church requested bids from several marble masons in Medellín, Italy, and Bogotá. Franco Lucarini, a mason from the Marmolería Italiana de U. Luisi Eredi in Medellín, was chosen to build the altar.

On 19 February 1954, having seen and analysed the project plans, the church signed the agreement to commission the altar. On 10 June extended the contract to include the tiling of the presbytery, and the tiling and the stairs of the side chapel, for 25,300 pesos.

The idea was that both the altar and the tiling would be unveiled between 15 and 20 September 1954, during the Marian Congress in Yarumal. Later, a representative from the mason company informed Father Jiménez that there were problems fulfilling the contract, as Italy was paralysed by a series of strikes. He responded that they would cause great damage to the parish if they did not finish, or at least exhaust all options to avoid delaying the inauguration.

Unfortunately they could not meet the deadline, as part of the work was sent from Italy via steamboat on 19 September 1954. The trip lasted roughly 25 days, and it took 10 days to pass customs and arrive in Yarumal. The rest of the work was also sent by sea, with the last part leaving on 15 December.

It took 18 trips to transport 184 boxes weighing a total of 100,820 kilograms from Cartagena to Yarumal. The price of the transport from the coast to Yarumal was 9,997.01 pesos.

On 1 February 1955 they began the work to assemble and place the altar. Manuel Rave Ángel and his son Gilberto were hired to do the work for 16,000 pesos. They were considered to be the ideal people for the job, as they were the ones who had placed the marble altar from Santa Rosa de Osos in 1936.

When they began work, they removed the altar stone from the altar that had been consecrated in 1944, along with the relics of the saints Teódulo, Martial, Modestina and Amanda, to be placed in the altar stone of the new altar when it was consecrated. These were stored in a metal box, protected with the episcopal seal of Miguel Ángel Builes, who transferred them to the custody to the parish priest.

On 7 February 1955 construction began on the foundation of the altar, made of metre-thick concrete. Lifting the 8 three-tonne columns began on 19 February, and was finished on the 26th.

On 2 March they installed the capitals on the eight columns, the 17th the entablature that joined the capitals, and the five medallions that symbolise the four evangelists and the titular saint Aloysius Gonzaga. On 31 March the cross was placed atop the altar.

On 19 April the altar rails were completed. On 21 April, the altar of the Blessed Saint was ready, with a Venetian mosaic of Leonardo da Vinci's The Last Supper. On the 28th the shrine was finished, and on the 30th the painting of the Virgin of Mercy was set in the niche.

The altar was consecrated on 8 June 1955. The bishop Builes, accompanied by the clergy, the Seminar of Missions, and the priest Efraím Jiménez, celebrated the mass of consecration. During the two-hour ceremony, the relics of saints Teódulo, Martial, Modestina, and Amanda were placed in the altar stone.

On 10 April 1955, Antonio Boroughs Rendón of Medellín was contracted for 1,600, to build an indirect lighting system. The church also purchased a red rug for more splendour. On 24 August of the same year they removed the wooden altar in the reserve chapel to replace it with the altar made in 1915. This transfer was done by Eugenio Salazar over the period between 26 August and 3 September, although the altar table was not moved as the found that it had deteriorated.

After the liturgical reforms of the Second Vatican Council, the Catholic Church ended the tradition of celebrating mass with the priest facing away from the congregation. Because of this, priest Roberto Arroyave Vélez needed to get the current "Altar of the Sacrifice" also made of marble, consecrated by Bishop Ordóñez, which happened on 18 September 1970.

=== Characteristics of the marble altar ===
The body of the altar is 12 metres (39 ft) high, 7 metres (23 ft) wide at the base, weighs 70 tonnes (77 short tons), and cost $23,000 dollars. It features 8 monolithic columns, placed in two semicircular rows. Each is 6 metres (20 ft) and 55 centimetres (22 in) in diameter. The columns are Corinthean, fitting with the general architectural style of the church.

The semicircular entablature rests on the capitals, made up of the architrave, frieze, and cornices. On its east side is a semi-dome decorated with high relief ornaments. In the centre is a shield with the initials "I.H.S.", a monogram of the name of Jesus Christ. The dome is topped with a cross. At the bottom of the semi-dome are five medallions representing the titular saint of the parish, Aloysius Gonzaga, and the Four Evangelists. These medallions are placed on a background of Venetian mosaic.

The half dome and columns form a sort of canopy which shelters the altar, church tabernacle, a shrine for the Virgin of Mercy made of green marble and topped by a monogram and a ducal crown, and the throne of the saint which is also decorated and enclosed in frames. In the far part of the altar is a reproduction of the Leonardo da Vinci's The Last Supper in Venetian mosaic.

=== Organ ===
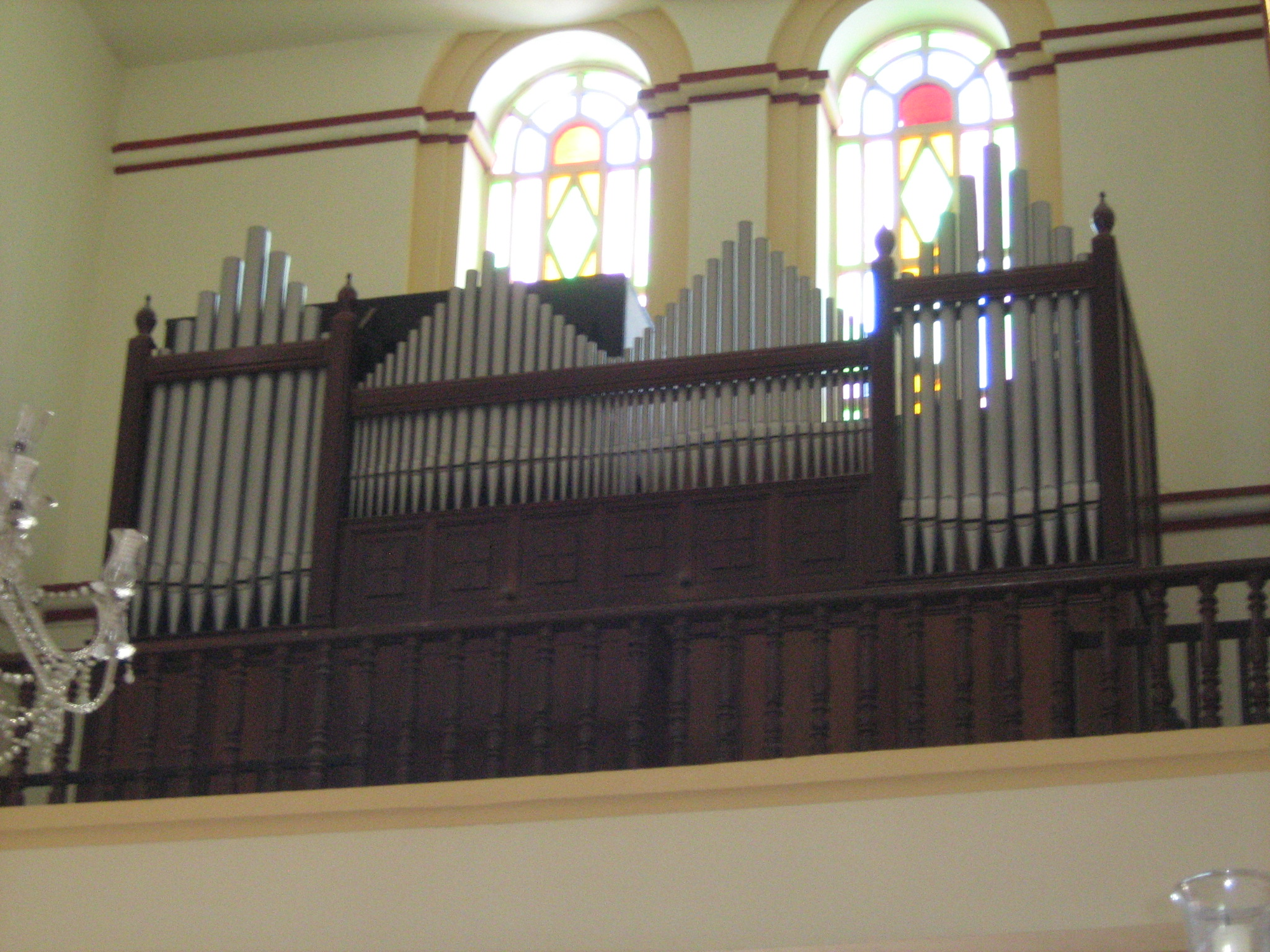
E.F. Walcker organ situated in the choir loft of the basilica. With 1,020 pipes, it is an orchestra that imitates trumpets, bombards, oboes, clarinets, flutes, and human voices.

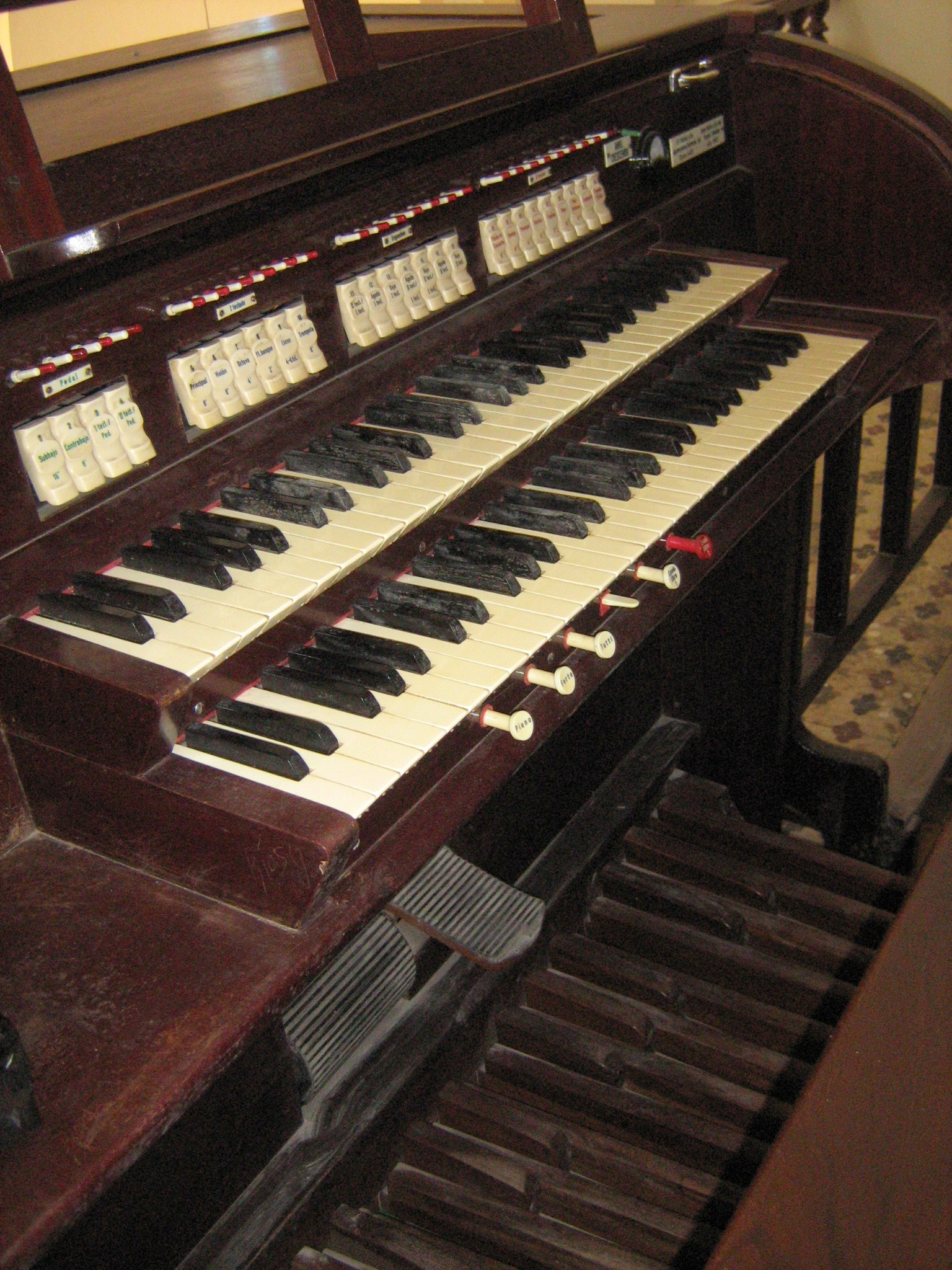
Console of the organ, composed of 17 stops over two manual keyboards, each with 61 notes, and a third keyboard played with the feet for the low bass

The interest in purchasing a musical instrument to accompany the religious celebrations traces back to 1880, when Father Aldemar Palacio received on 3 June a letter from Jesús María Rodríguez, Provisor of the Bishop of Antioquia. The letter said that it was necessary for all the churches in the diocese to have a musical instrument, and as such ordered that an organ be purchased. However, due to the economic difficulties caused by the construction of the church, the purchase was postponed.

On 11 October 1900, the Presbyter Emigdio A. Palacio informed the Board of the Works on the Church of the need to purchase a musical instrument. The Board of Manufacture resolved unanimously to contribute 1,000 with the cost of the organ quantity of until 1,500 pesos, that they would provide once the instrument was purchased.

In 1947, the Presbyter Francisco Galician Pérez purchased a Hammond organ for 7,000 pesos, which was unveiled on 16 July by the teacher Cabral. It was blessed by the parish priest on 14 September.

The current pipe organ was obtained by the priest Efraím Jiménez from Oskar Binder & Cia. Ltda. of the city of Bogotá, which was the exclusive Colombian representative for E.F. Walcker of Ludwigsburg, Germany. The company was founded in 1785 and had experience in building this type of organs for tropical climates. To provide a quote, a delegate from the firm moved to Yarumal to study the style and acoustics of the church, for which he suggested a pipe organ with 17 registrations, or 1020 pipes in total. It was valued at 102,000 pesos to be paid over three years. Father Jiménez requested permission to approve the contract from Bishop Miguel Ángel Builes, who allowed it and congratulated to the priest for his initiative.

On 19 February 1961 the agreement was signed by the Presbyter Jiménez, Benedicto Soto Mejía (the chief of building), and by Oskar Binder (the delegate from the organ seller).

The pipe organ, weighing four tonnes, was sent from Bogotá by way of Sonsón on 6 March 1963. It arrived in Yarumal three days later, and it was put in the basilica through the "Door of the Pardon". Its installation began on 11 March, overseen by Oskar Binder, and it debuted on 19 March, the Day of Saint Joseph. The instrument was blessed from the pulpit by Bishop Builes before beginning the liturgy on Sunday 24 March.

The Hammond organ was sold to the Chapel of the Conciliar Seminary of Santa Rosa de Osos for 25,000 pesos.

The E.F. Walcker organ is composed of 17 stops spread among two manual keyboards, each with 61 keys, and a keyboard played with the feet to produce low bass notes. All the keyboards are in a console, which is separated and put in front of the organ with sight of the altar. These keyboards control 1,020 pipes of varied length and calibre. The organ is an orchestra in and of itself, with instruments like trumpets, bombards, oboes, clarinets, flutes and human voices. It is made of varnished and sealed mahogany. The organ works with an electrical fan and a 14-volt dynamo providing continuous current to the motor. Of the 32 organs in Antioquia, the basilica's is the eighth largest in area and volume.

=== Stations of the Cross ===
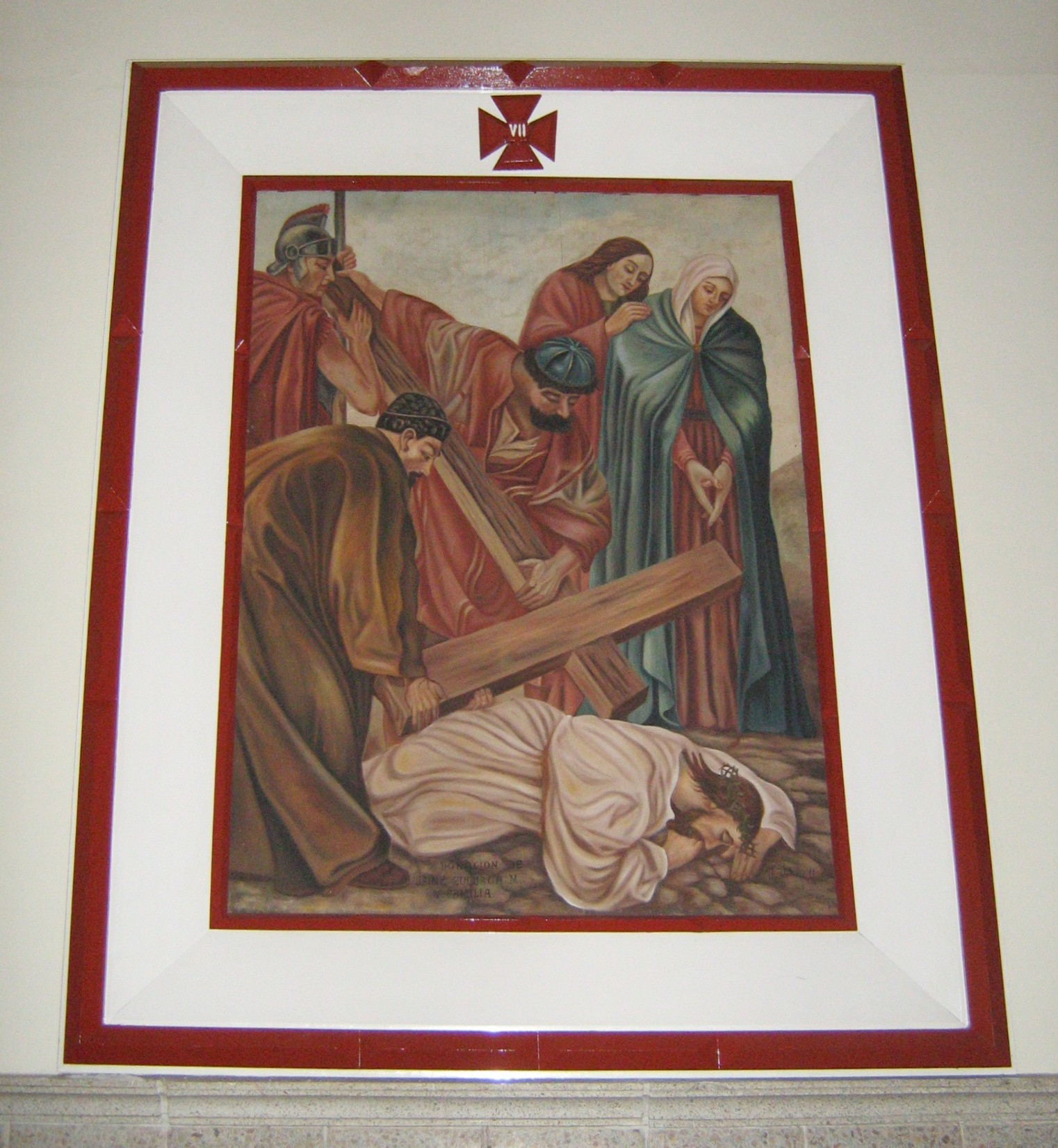
Station VII of the Via Crucis. The 14 oil paintings depicting the Stations of the Cross were made in 1945–46 by Mariela Ochoa, copying some German illustrations

Some of the first representations of the passion and death of Jesus Christ in the church of Our Lady of Mercy were the 50 x 60 cm oil paintings. They were obtained by Bárbara Palacio of Mejía, aunt of Father Benedicto Soto, and donated to the parish, which in turn donated them to the chapel of the Pontifical Seminar of Missions where they still remain. This painting was canonically erected by J. Buenaventura Marín on 7 October 1903, with the priest and vicar Emigdio Palacio bearing witness.

The current paintings in the parish church that show the Stations of the Cross were made in 1945 and 1946 when Francisco Galician Pérez commissioned Mariela Ochoa U. of Medellín to provide 14 oil paintings. The images were copied from a collection of illustrations brought by Father Gallego from Germany. Each painting cost one hundred pesos.

=== Stained glass ===
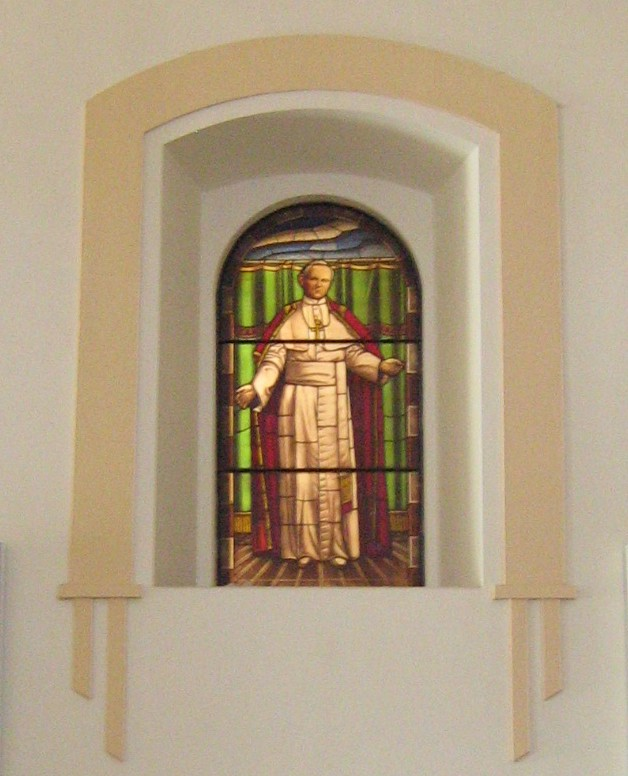
Stained glass window with the image of Pope John Paul II. The basilica has eleven windows made by a Caleño artist in the late 20th century.

The church began with simple stained glass windows. Monsignor Melguizo Yepes decided to obtain some artistic stained glass windows to adorn the building. They were commissioned from an artist from Cali and made from cathedral glass.

There are 11 in total with different figures and drawings, and they cover the lower series of windows in the external walls, between the transept and the towers. The rest of the windows continue to have the simple stained glass.

In the western wall facing the Rosenda Torres school are five stained glass windows. From north to south, they depict Jesus with his apostles; Saint Francis Xavier, patron of missions; Pope John Paul II, who beatified Father Mariano and granted the church the title of lower basilica; Mariano de Jesús Euse Hoyos, blessed by the Catholic Church, who was born in and coadjutor of Yarumal; and Saint Joseph.

In the wall of the eastern nave which faces the street, there are six stained glass windows. From north to south they depict Baby Jesus and the Holy Family; the Good Shepherd; the birth of Jesus Christ; the Trinity; the part of the gubernatorial decree that declares the Virgin of Mercy to be the perpetual mayor of Yarumal; and a replica of the Quiteño painting of the Virgin of Mercy.

=== Crystal chandeliers ===
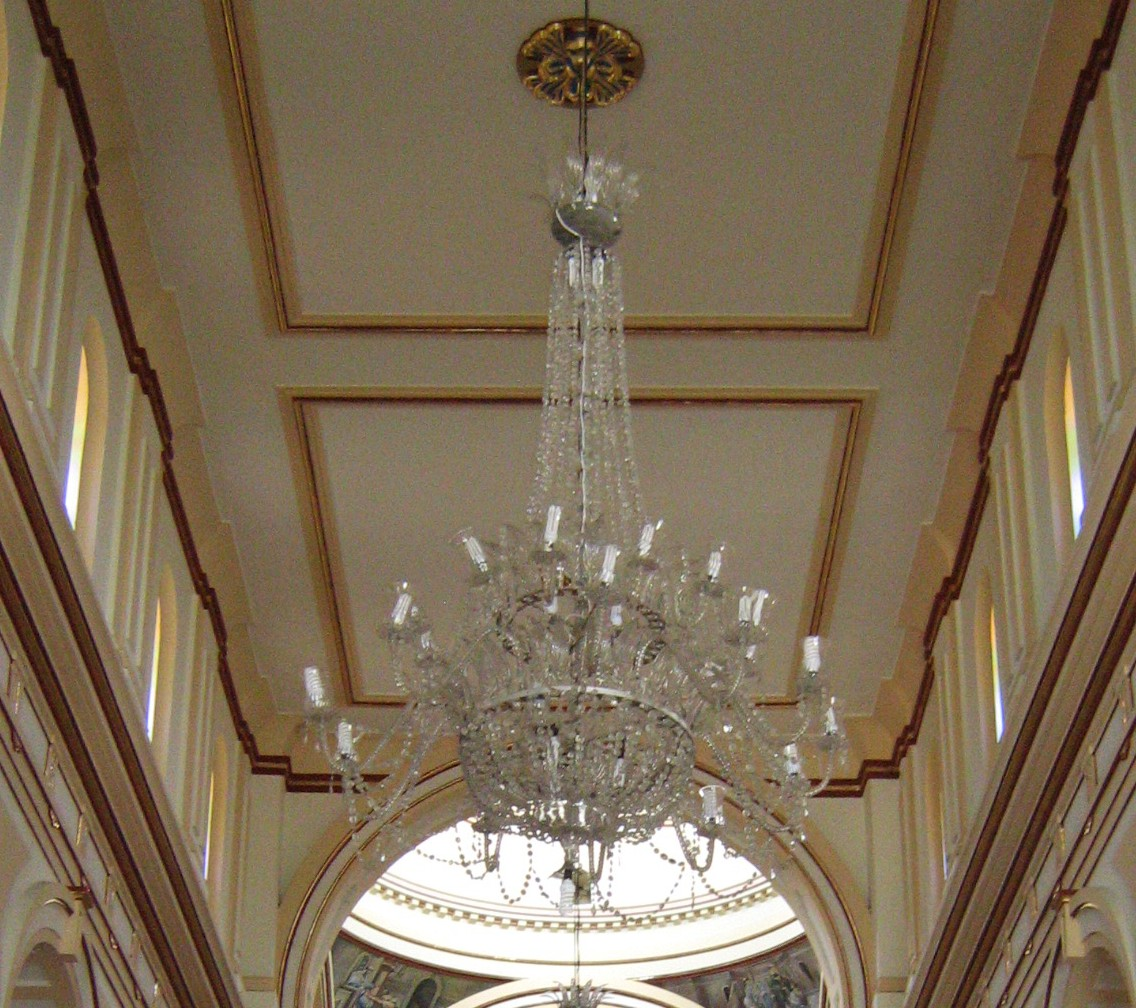
Four crystal chandeliers were purchased for the central nave between 1959 and 1960. They are 3.2 metres (10 ft) high and 2.3 metres (7.5 ft) wide.

The central nave features four large crystal chandeliers, 3.2 metres (10 ft) high and 2.3 metres (7.5 ft) wide which were purchased and installed between 1959 and 1960 by Presbyter Efraím Jiménez, following a demonstration by a delegate from the lamp seller.

Initially, two crystal chandeliers where ordered and installed as a trial. The first of the two was installed permanently on 23 October 1959.

The idea, finalised that same year, was to place two further chandeliers in the central nave, and that for Easter of 1960, additional smaller ones be installed in the presbytery, reserve altar, side naves, and in the main arches underneath the basilica's dome. A total of thirteen crystal chandeliers were ordered from the French glassware firm Baccarat, at a total cost of 60,000 pesos. The final chandelier was installed on 11 February 1960.

=== Clock ===
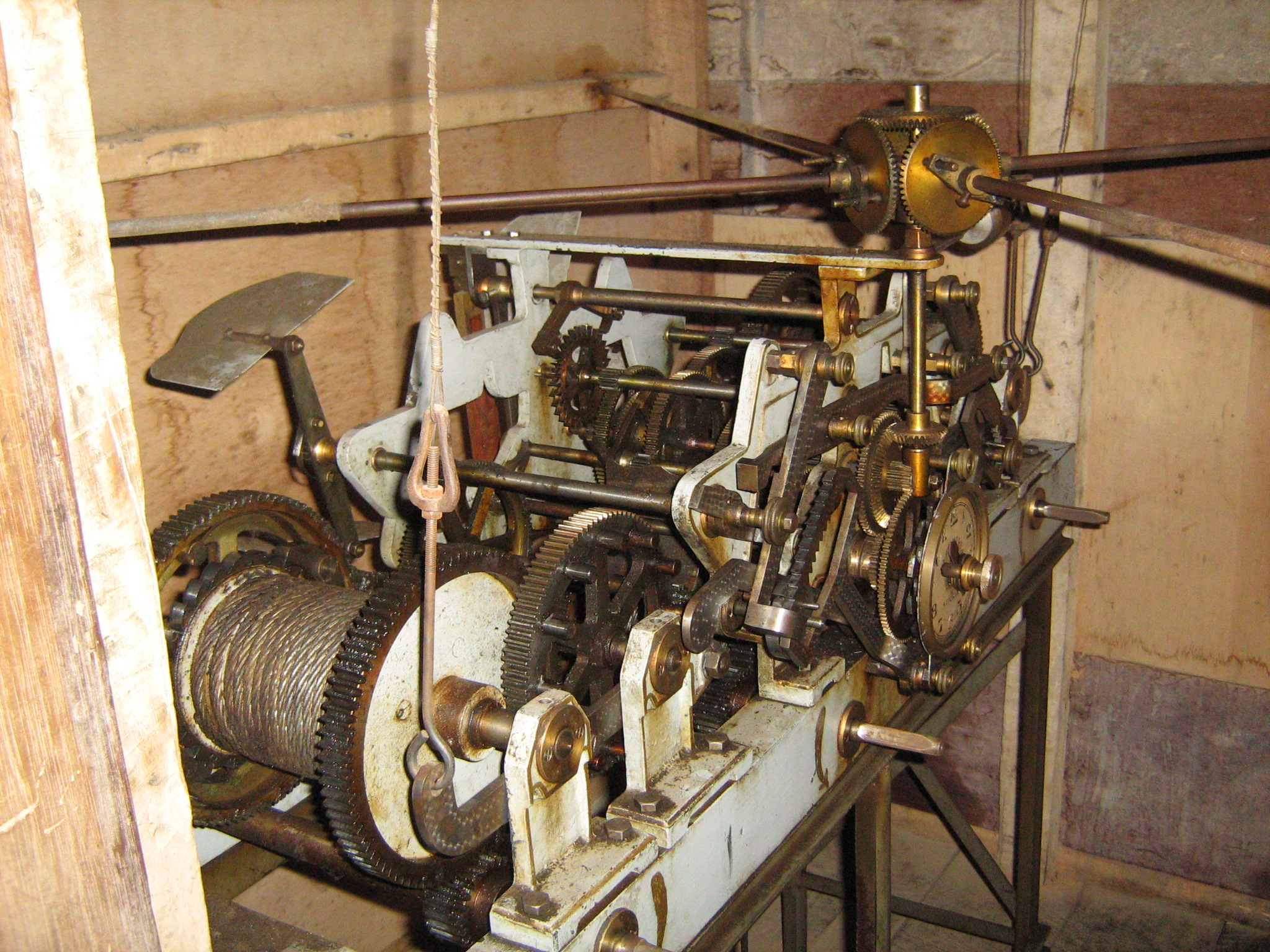
Mechanism of the clock. The 4 bars in shape of X of the top are the ones that move the hands, which are located in the tower. It was manufactured in Spain and replaced the previous mechanism in 1966. Its bells ring every quarter-hour.

On 2 December 1882, while the church was still under construction, José María Díaz donated the first clock for the temple. It was originally installed in the tower above the "Door of the Pardon", as this was the first tower that was built. In 1920 was moved to the circular area between the windows on the central door.

It remained in place until 24 May 1966, when it was replaced by the new four-faced clock from Vitoria, Spain. The clock was solemnly blessed by the Bishop Miguel Ángel Builes the day before its installation, during the celebration of the evening mass. The thought at that time was to place the old clock in the cemetery of Carmen.

The clock rings every fifteen minutes, with its own bells for such purpose. The mechanism of the clock automatically sounds the bells by pulling ropes which in turn move hammers to strike the bell.

=== Bells ===
The old bells of the temple were in terrible shape, as they had cracks reduced their volume. Monsignor Melguizo Yepes arranged the purchase of some new bells, and removed the damaged bells from the right tower and sent them to the Tristancho workshops where they were melted to manufacture new bells. The Tristancho are a family of bellmakers with a long history in Colombia, as they are a dynasty that has made bells for 250 years.

The bells were made using the lost mould technique, as the mould for the bell is used only once and breaks. Therefore, the two bells are not identical. The manufacture of a bell takes two months of work and is totally artesanal. It begins with the preparation of the mould, which is made from three types of clay mixed with horse manure. A frame is built from bamboo, and clay is applied in layers until dry. This operation is repeated several times. Subsequently, the interior and exterior of the mould is machined into the shape of the bell, and sheep tallow is applied to release the mould. Afterwards, a countermould is applied and heated to absorb the tallow so the mould and countermould can be removed. The mould and the countermould are burned, leaving a void that will fill with molten melted.

The foundry process is done in mud ovens where only dry firewood is used for fuel. The copper and the tin are melted at temperatures of 1,200 degrees Celsius. The bell is made in a single piece and in an instant, as it only takes three seconds to fill a mould for a 300 kilogram bell. After the foundry, it is left to cool for two days, then polished by hand.

The three bells are large and made in bronze, and cost 7,500,000 pesos. They were unveiled by Melguizo during the patron saint celebrations in 1997, and were baptised from highest to lowest with the names of the Lady of Mercy, Saint Aloysius Gonzaga, and Benedicto, weighing 500, 310, and 300 kilograms respectively. They are used to announce religious activities, operated manually from the lower part of the tower with ropes that move clappers that hang inside each bell.

=== Baptismal font ===
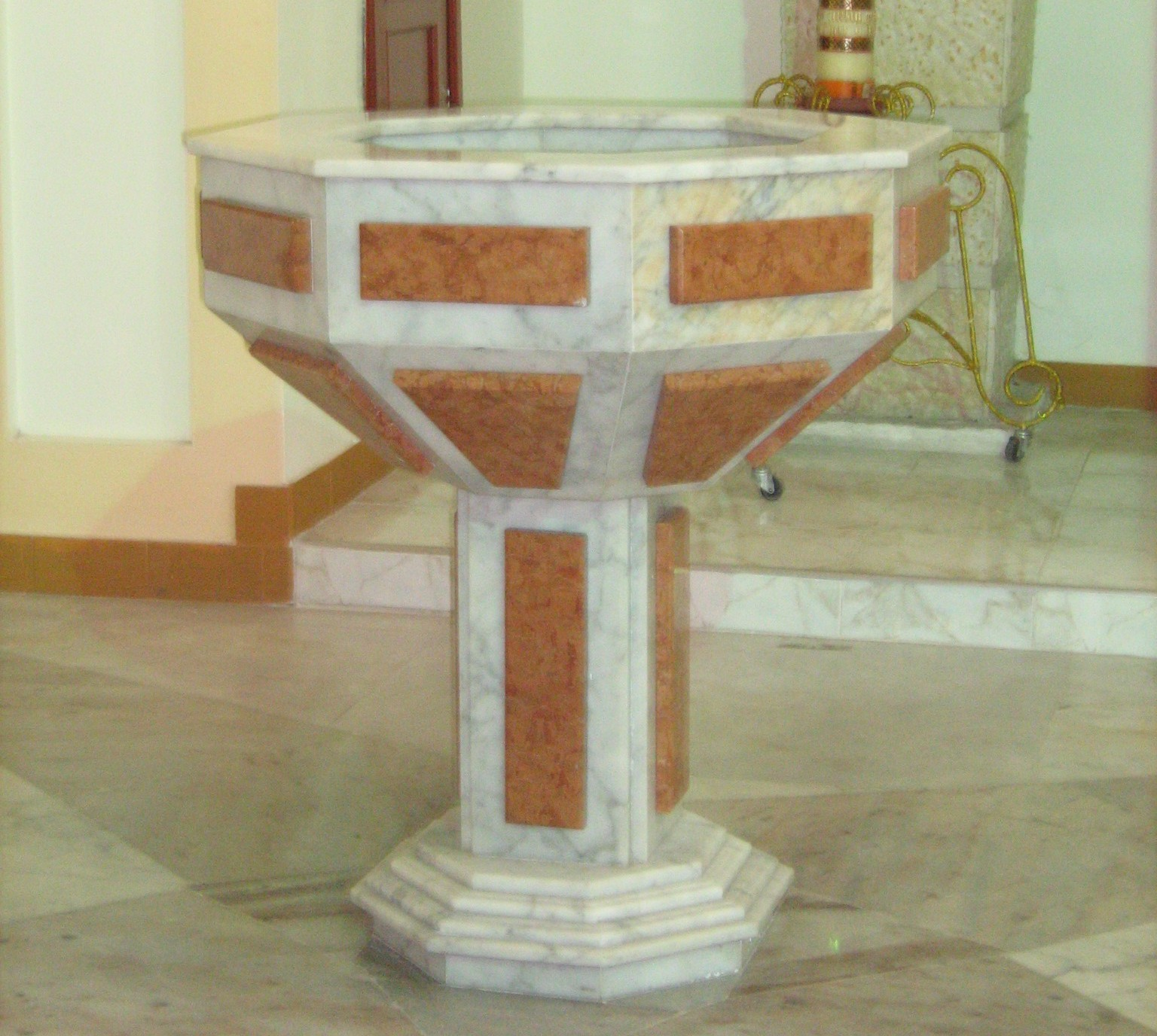
Baptismal font

The church of Our Lady of Mercy has had four baptismal fonts. The first is found in what is currently the chapel the first found in the place that at present is the chapel of the Fallen Christ, formerly the baptistry, which had for decoration a picture of the Holy Trinity. The second baptismal font was built by Gallego Pérez, placed further back and equidistant between the chapel of the Fallen Christ and the chapel of Our Lady of Perpetual Help.

The third baptismal font was located in the head of the church in the left nave. It was obtained under an initiative of Father Roberto Arroyave, who in 1975 hired its construction from bogotana (a type of sandstone) with the signature "Enchapes Sacatín" for 80,000 pesos.

The fourth and current baptismal font is situated in the same place as the third, and was acquired by Gilberto Melguizo Yepes. It is built from marble from the bottom up, and features a staggered octagonal base, followed by a square pillar that holds octagonal basin that holds the water.

=== Holy water fonts ===
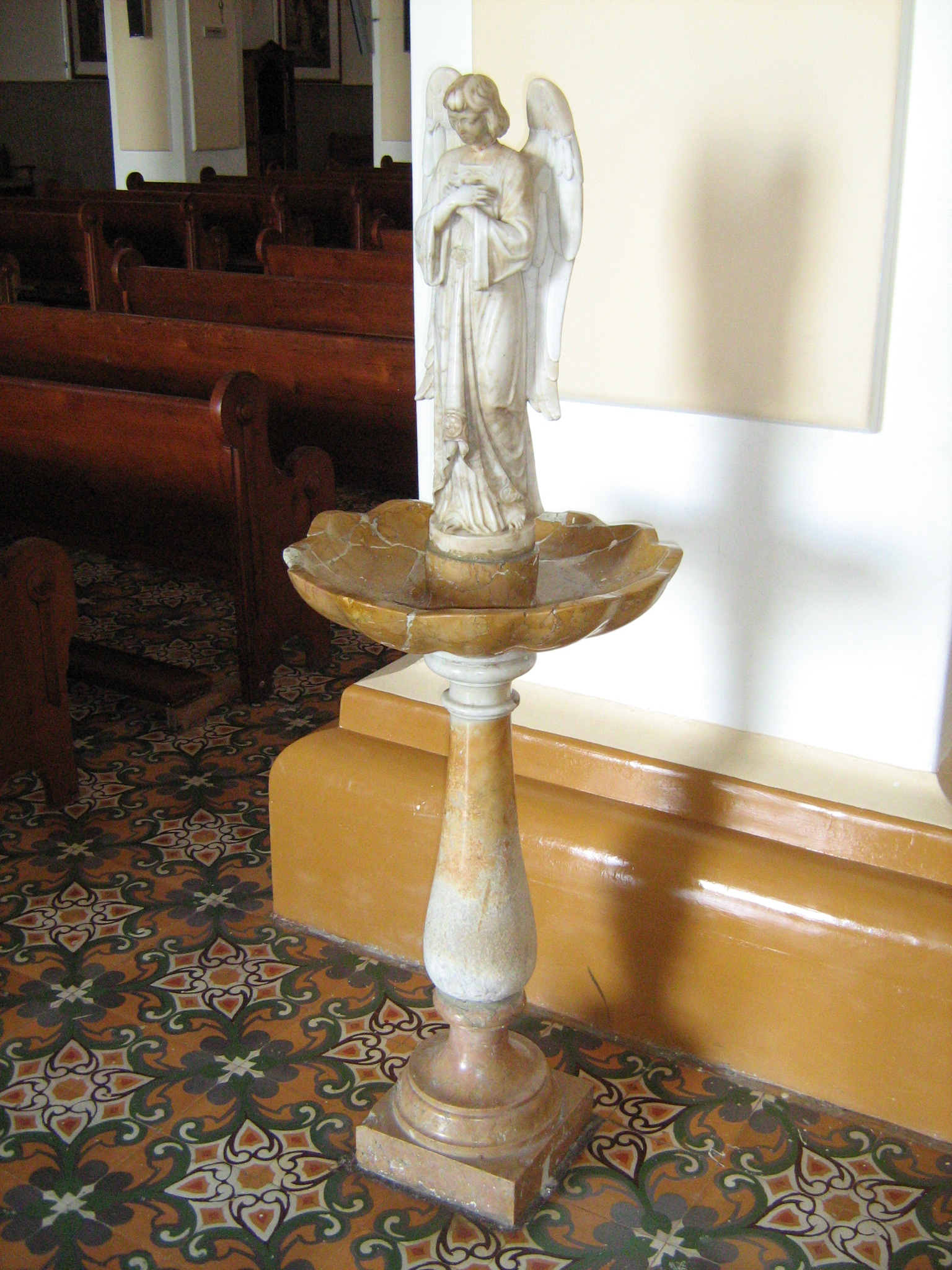
Font of holy water

The two fonts of holy water were purchased by Father Ernesto Acosta Arteaga in 1945 from the Marmolería Artistica of Hermenegildo Bibolotti. They are made of marble and are 160 centimetres (63 in) height. Each has a base, column, and basin to hold the water, and in the middle of this basin is a statue of an angel.

=== Candelabras ===
In 1924 the Presbyteries Rafael and José Manuel Yepes Carvajal donated to the church 12 enormous French candelabras (1.5 metres (4.9 ft) in height) that were used in the eucharistic vigils from 1 June to 16 July, finishing with the celebration of the Virgin of Carmen. The Presbytery Luis Enrique Restrepo Muñoz restored them during his first five years of service. Currently they remain for a large part of the year at the foot of the main altar.

=== Pulpit ===
The basilica had a pulpit made by the Carvajales Martínez men. It was finished with imitation marble and with four allegorical applications of the evangelists. It was demolished on 25 January 1971. The rosettes are preserved in the Traditional Museum of Monsignor Juan N. Rueda.

== Art ==
Before the Second Vatican Council the church of Our Lady of Mercy, as was usual, had a large variety of art. As a result of the provisions from the council, these were removed on 18 July 1967.

Between the works that were removed are: the paintings of the Holy Family, the Sacred Heart, the Immaculate Heart of Mary, Saint Joseph, Saint John Eudes, Saint Roch, Saint Thérèse of Lisieux, Saint Tarcisius, Our Lady of Mount Carmel, the Infant Jesus of Prague, the Infent Jesus of the Small Flock, the ancient Quiteño painting of the Virgin of Our Lady of Sorrows and the Child Mary. Some remained for a time before being removed, the patron saint Our Lady of Mercy, the titular Saint Aloysius Gonzaga, Our Lady of Perpetual Help, the three pictures of the Ordeal, the Our Lady of Fátima, Saint Augustine of Hippo, Saint Antonio, the embrace of Saint Francis of Assisi, Saint Nicholas of Tolentino, the Fallen Christ, and the divine countenance.

Some images were still under determination for whether they would be kept or removed: the ones of the Virgin of Carmen, one of the Immaculate Conception (by Bartolomé Esteban Murillo), Christ the King, and the pictures of the Stations of Christ. The final location of the pictures of the Stations of Christ would depend on the considerations of the parish priest and of Bishop Félix María Torres Parra; finally they were placed on 14 August 1967, and work on decorating the church was about to finish.

The pictures that are currently found in the church are: the Immaculate Conception, the Virgin of Carmen, Saint Francis of Assisi embracing Christ on the cross, the Sacred Heart of Jesus, Saint Joseph, and the Blessed Mariano de Jesús Euse Hoyos. All of these images are located in the transept. The painting of the Fallen Christ is located in the chapel, and in the reserve altar are the paintings of Mary Help of Christians, Salvator Mundi, and six angels.

=== The Fallen Christ ===
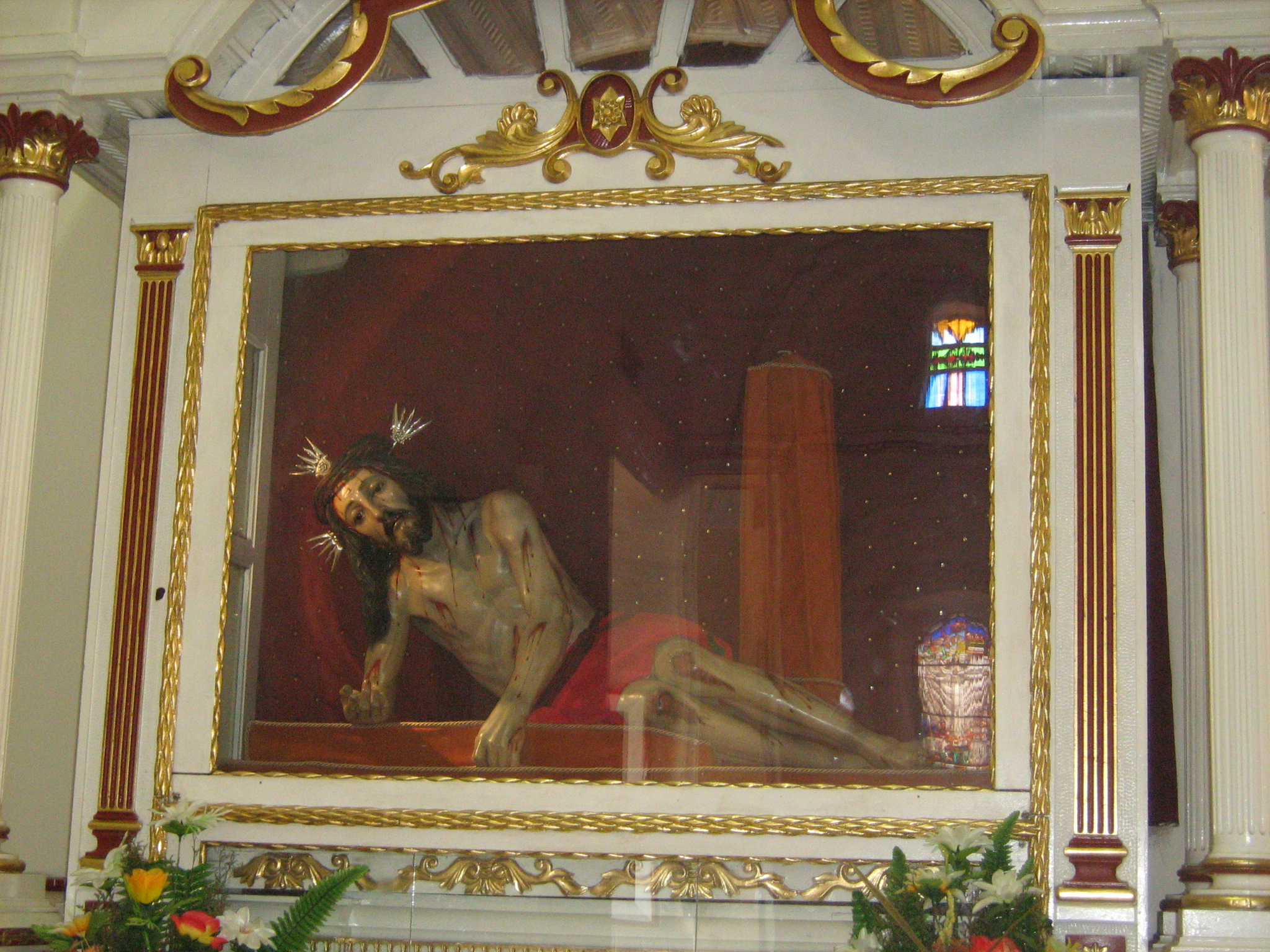
Painting of the Fallen Christ created in 1935 by Constantino Carvajal. The urn is made by Francisco Gómez Estrada.

The early church of Yarumal had the image of the Christ on the Column, which is referenced in the 1845 inventory, but today information on the painting and its whereabouts are unknown. As the church lacked an image representing a scene from the Passion of Christ, in 1935 Bishop Miguel Ángel Builes ordered the rector to commission an image of the Fallen Christ to be put in the church where it could be revered by the parishioners.

In compliance with this request, Presbyter Gerardo Martínez Madrigal began work to make suitable the chapel at the side of the presbytery and on 10 September 1938 made the final payment to Misael Osorio. The statue of the Fallen Christ was carved by Constantino Carvajal in 1935 for 400 pesos. The corresponding urn is the work of Francisco Gómez Estrada, who manufactured it for 100 pesos.

In 1935, this image was inaugurated on the days in that they celebrated the Eucharistic Congress and the patron saints. Currently the image of the Fallen Christ is located in a chapel at the foot of the temple, previously the baptistry, which is next to the left nave.

=== Dormition of the Mother of God ===
Fernando Ramírez and his wife Elena Rivera, originally from Sopetrán, had obtained in the late 19th century a Barcelonan picture of the Dormition of the Mother of God.

One their children expressed the wish that when his sister Carmen Ramírez Rivera of Botero died, the image become property of the parish. She died on 22 March 1955, and in compliance with his will, Germán Ceballos Ramírez delivered the picture to the parish.

The Assumption of Mary symbolises the elevation of the body and soul of María to heaven. This belief traces back to the period of the apostles, but it was only on 1 November 1950 that this was established as dogma by Pope Pius XII.

=== The Infant Mary ===
This image arrived in Yarumal on 6 January 1963. It was carved by Josué Giraldo Mejía, and it represents three invocations of the Virgin Mary: one of the Infant Mary, one of the Immaculate Heart of Mary, and the one of Our Lady of the Rosary. The sculpture features blue clothing, without a mantle, and a rosary hung on her hands. It is topped by a garland of pink roses that symbolise the joyful mysteries; it carries another crown of red roses around her heart to represent the painful mysteries; and a third crown of yellow roses surrounds her feet to represent the glorious mysteries.

=== Altar crucifix ===
In the night of the 8 to 9 January 1958 there was a fire in the altar stone, and its extinction resulted in the crucifix being destroyed. A new one was donated by Antonio Hoyos Mejía. The cross was prepared in Yarumal by the cabinetmaker Alfonso Areiza Medina for 20 pesos, and on said cross artist David Pérez of Medellín created a sculpture of Christ for 300 pesos. The work was delivered on Holy Thursday of 3 April of the same year, and unveiled on Good Friday for public veneration during the liturgical celebration that afternoon. Christ is depicted carrying the three powers of gold that belonged to the Divine Boy Jesus of Prague, donated by Mercedes Ramírez Rivera. The cross has a characteristic glow generated by the copper encasement, made by the order of the rector Roberto Arroyave. The glow was made to imitate of the image of the Lord of the Miracles, which is a crucifix located in the Basilica of San Pedro of the Miracles.

== Services ==
In the basilica, three daily masses are celebrated Monday to Saturday. On Sundays there are eight masses. The schedules sometimes change based on celebrations of the patron saint, Holy Week, Christmas, or the Catholic calendar.
