= Epifanio Mejia =

Colombian poet and politician

Epifanio Mejía Quijano
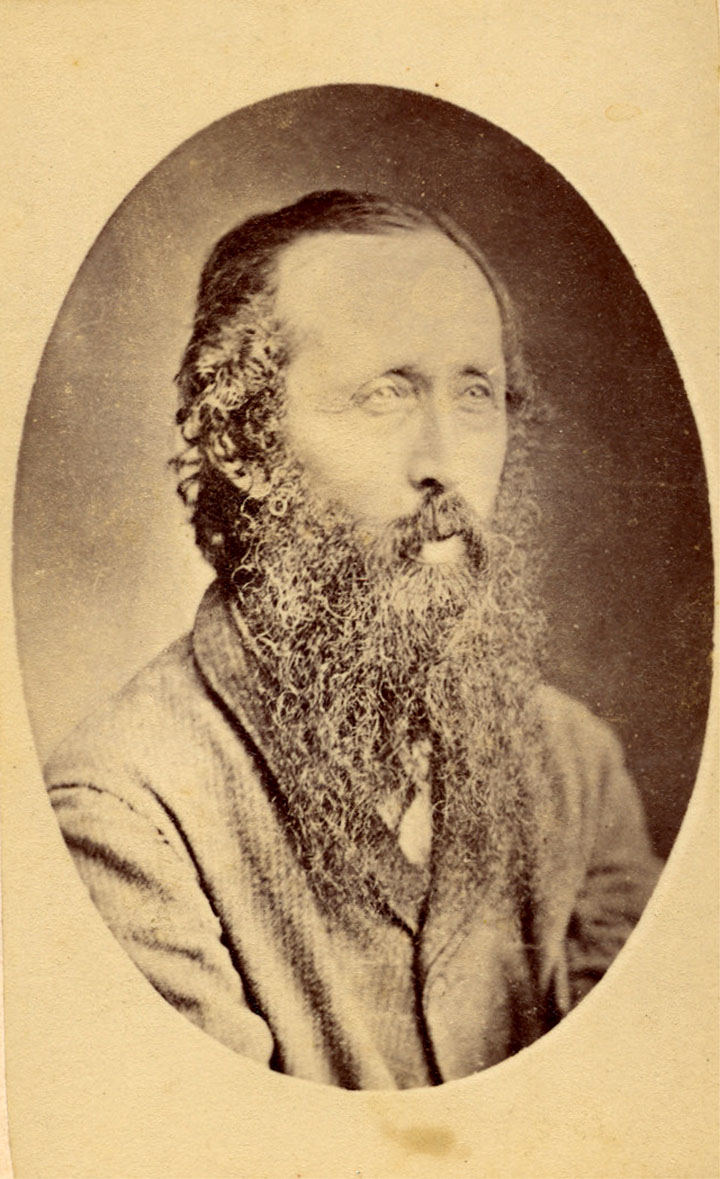
- Epifanio Mejía
- Born: April 9, 1838; Yarumal, Antioquia, Republic of New Granada
- Died: July 31, 1913 (aged 75); Medellín, Colombia
- Occupations: Poet, Politician
- Notable work: The song of Antioquia (Anthem of Antioquia)
- Parents: Ramon Mejia Vallejo (father); Maria Luisa Quijano (mother)

Epifanio Mejía Quijano (1838–1913) was a Colombian poet and politician who in his lifetime published over 134 poems. He was born in Yarumal, Antioquia, in 1838, in an hacienda known as El Caunce, and died in an insane asylum in Medellín in 1913. He is known as one of the most famous poets from Antioquia; one of his poems was chosen as the official Anthem of Antioquia.

== Biography ==
He was the son of Ramon Mejia Vallejo and Maria Luisa Quijano. After the death of his father, he moved to Medellin in search of better economic opportunities. He soon started to write poetry.

Alongside the poet Gregorio Gutiérrez González and others of his stature, Epifanio Mejía was one of the major poets from Antioquia during the 19th century. One of his poems, "The song of Antioquia," was chosen as the official anthem of Antioquia.

Between 1868 and 1869, he collaborated on the literary magazine El Oasis (The Oasis), directed by Isidoro Isaza. He was considered insane and admitted to the mental hospital in Medellín at the age of 31, where he died in 1913.

== See also ==
- Basilica of Our Lady of Mercy, Yarumal
