= Mariano de Jesús Euse Hoyos =

Colombian Roman Catholic priest

Blessed Mariano de Jesús Euse Hoyos
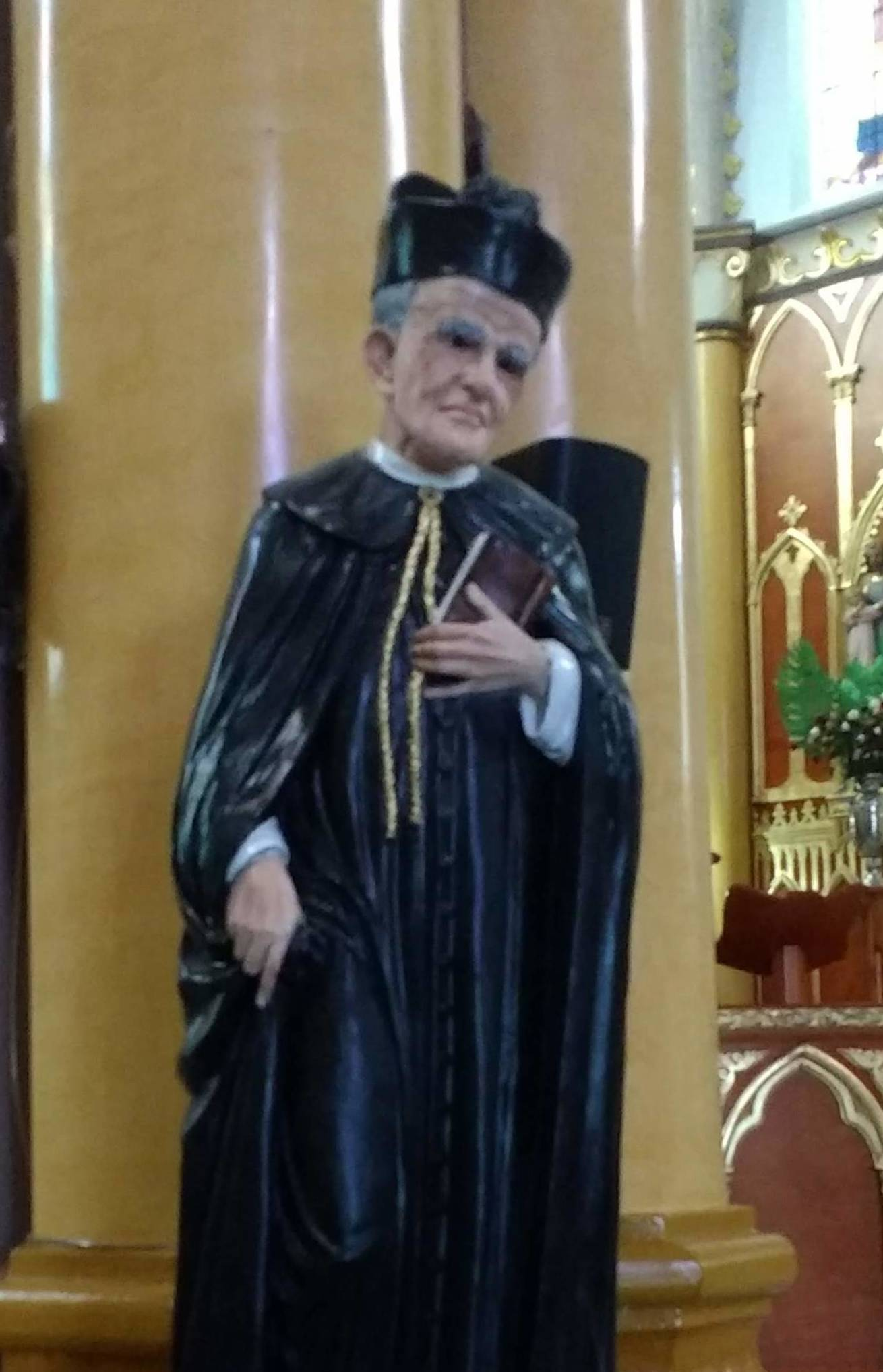

Priest
- Born: 14 October 1845; Yarumal, Antioquia, Colombia
- Died: 13 July 1926 (aged 80); Angostura, Antioquia, Colombia
- Venerated in: Roman Catholic Church
- Beatified: 9 April 2000, Saint Peter's Square, Vatican City by Pope John Paul II
- Feast: 13 July
- Attributes: Priest's cassock
- Patronage: Against cancer; Rural laborers

Mariano de Jesús Euse Hoyos (14 October 1845 - 13 July 1926) was a Colombian Roman Catholic priest ordained in 1872 for the Diocese of Santa Rosa de Osos. He worked in his parish as a staunch defender of the poor and of rural laborers - he himself came from rural origins - and encouraged popular devotions amongst the Colombian faithful.

His beatification received the approval of Pope John Paul II who presided over the celebration on 9 April 2000.

== Life ==
Mariano de Jesús Euse Hoyos was born on 14 October 1845 as the eldest of seven children to Pedro Euse and Rosalía de Hoyos Echeverri during an uncertain period of anti-religious sentiment. He was baptized on 15 October and received the sacrament of Confirmation in 1847. His great-grandfather Pedro Euse hailed from France.

In 1860 he entered the College of Saint Joseph of Marinilla where he studied mathematics and passed all his studies with excellent results. From the age of sixteen in 1861 he harbored the desire of becoming a priest and was then entrusted to the care of his priest uncle Firmino Hoyos - the parish priest of Girardota - and received from him a cultural and spiritual formation. He commenced his studies for the priesthood on 3 February 1869 at a new seminary opened in Mendellin and was ordained as a priest on 14 July 1872. He began his clerical career as a curate to his uncle until his uncle died in January 1875 and he was transferred to Yarumal in 1876.

In 1878 he was assigned as a parish priest in Angostura and spent the remainder of his life there. It was there that he became well aware of the parish difficulties such as the construction of an appropriate parish church. He then became the parish priest on 21 January 1882 after the death of the old and frail priest Rudesindo Correa. He became well noted for being a simple and effective preacher and tended to the social and spiritual needs of the poor of the region with a particular emphasis on rural laborers; he often called the poor "Christ's nobles". His particular parish was in an area that civil war often plagued - in which neither side favored the faith - so he had to several times hide in caves in the area to escape the fighting. The priest also encouraged popular devotions such as the Sacred Heart and encouraged recitation of rosaries amongst families.

He became bedridden in mid-June 1926 with a serious infection and later died in the first few hours of 13 July 1926 due to U.T.I. He had been stricken - on 12 July - with enteritis. He said on his deathbed: "I have already lived long enough. Now my greatest desire is to be united to my Jesus.

== Beatification ==
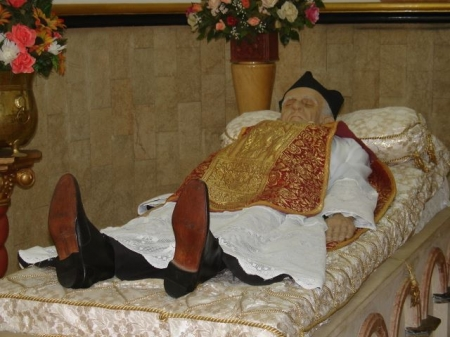
Intact remains.

The beatification process opened in Santa Rosa de Osos on 2 April 1982 after the Congregation for the Causes of Saints granted the official "nihil obstat" ('nothing against') to the cause and titled the late priest as a Servant of God. The cognitional process commenced and concluded following this declaration and received C.C.S. validation in Rome on 21 December 1984.

The Positio then was submitted to Roman officials for further assessment while theologians voiced their approval to the dossier's contents on 9 May 1989 and the C.C.S. themselves following suit on 19 December 1989. The late priest became titled as Venerable on 3 March 1990 after Pope John Paul II confirmed his life of heroic virtue.

The miracle required for possible beatification received diocesan investigation and then C.C.S. validation on 11 October 1996 while a medical commission met on two occasions - on 5 February 1998 and 4 April 1998 - to discuss and approve the miracle. The C.C.S. had their consulting theologians to evaluate the miracle and approve it on 25 September 1998 while the C.C.S. themselves voiced their assent to the miracle on 2 February 1999. The pope granted his final approval to the healing as being a credible miracle on 26 March 1999 and beatified the priest on 9 April 2000 in Saint Peter's Square.

The current postulator that is assigned to the cause is Antonio Sáez de Albéniz.

=== Miracle ===
The miracle that led to his beatification involved the cure of the priest Rafael Gildardo Velez Saldarriaga (b. 1912) from Medellin who underwent an operation for his prostate in 1970 though developed cancer on the scar in 1982. He had operations and also underwent cobalt and estrogen therapies and seemed to recover from his ailment - in March 1987 he contracted oedema of the legs that transcended to elephantiasis.

Metastasis of the spinal column followed and the situation was pronounced terminal for him. In September 1987 he began to demonstrate signs of improvement and within two months the oedema was reduced and the cellulitis and bone metastasis all but disappeared. Doctors and scientists examined him in June 1991 and declared that there was no scientific explanation for the cure. Additional evaluations were done in 1997 in which it was declared he had recovered in full from his condition.
