= Yarumal =

Town in Antioquia Department, Colombia

- Municipality and town
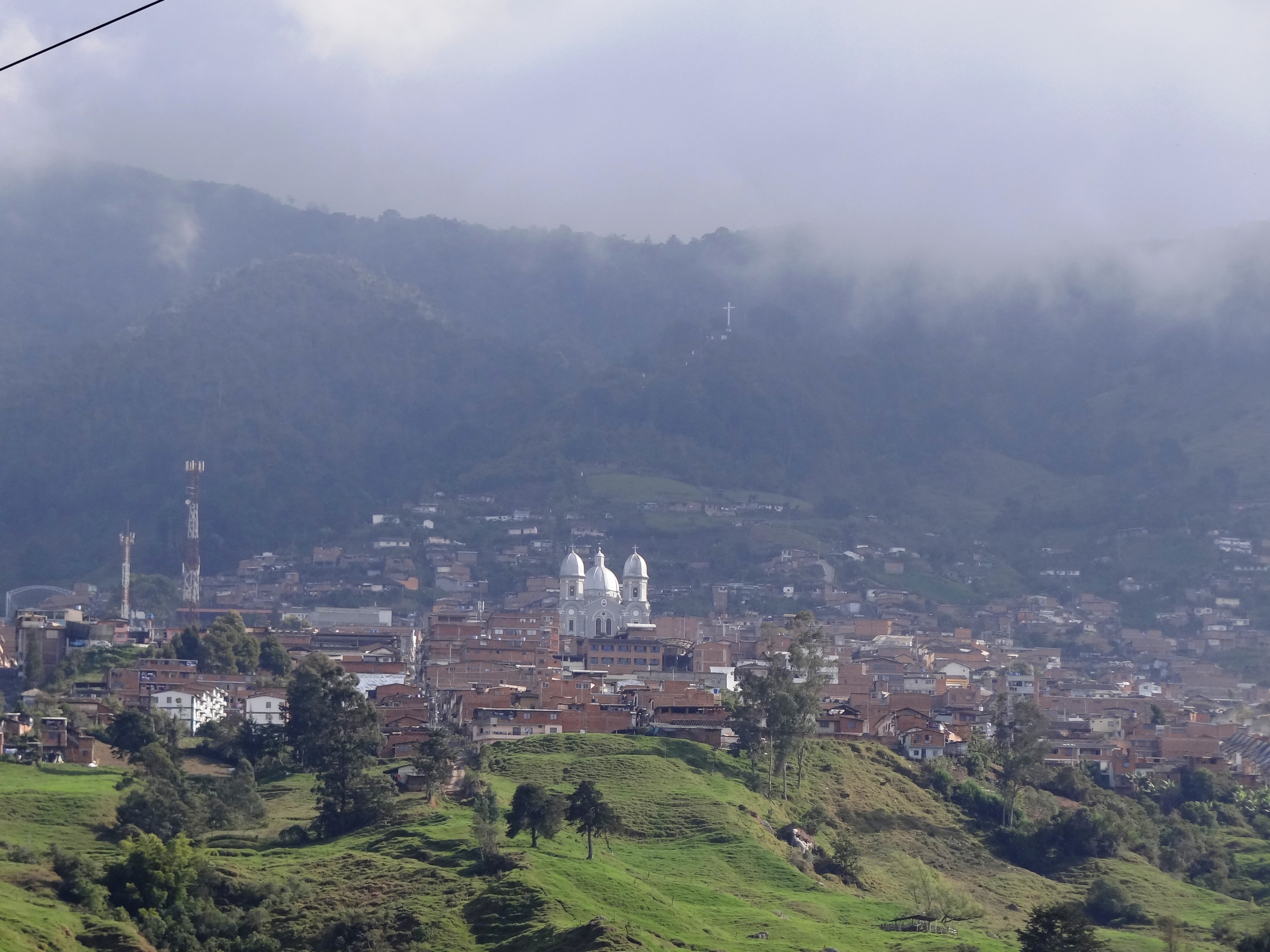

- Flag Coat of arms

- Location of the municipality and town of Yarumal in the Antioquia Department of Colombia

- Location in Colombia
- Coordinates: 6°57′48″N 75°25′2″W
- Country: Colombia
- Department: Antioquia Department
- Subregion: Northern

Area
  - Municipality and town: 738.3 km^{2} (285.1 sq mi)
  - Urban: 2.55 km^{2} (0.98 sq mi)
- Elevation: 2,265 m (7,431 ft)

Population (2018 census)
  - Municipality and town: 41,542
  - Density: 56.27/km^{2} (145.7/sq mi)
  - Urban: 29,049
  - Urban density: 11,400/km^{2} (29,500/sq mi)
- Time zone: UTC-5 (Colombia Standard Time)

Yarumal is a municipality in the Antioquia Department, Colombia. The municipality (three parishes and 20 villages) has an area of 738.3 km^{2} (285.1 sq mi). The population was 41,542 at the 2018 census. Its average elevation is 2,265 m (7,431 ft) above sea level.

It has a minor basilica, Our Lady of Mercy, which is a parish church of architectural note.

It gave its name to the Yarumal Society for the Foreign Missions (M.X.Y./I.M.E.Y.), a Medellín-based Latin Catholic Society of Apostolic Life of Pontifical Right for Men, which despite its name is especially active in Colombian missions.

== History ==
Yarumal was founded in 1787 as San Luis de Gongora. Municipal status was granted in 1821.

=== Name ===
The current name of Yarumal comes from a local plant of the family Moraceae, known in botanical Latin as Cecropia peltata L.

== Health ==
An unusually large proportion of the inhabitants suffer from early-onset Alzheimer's disease, which is caused by the gene mutation E280A. The genetic mutation is thought to have come from a Spanish conquistador. Approximately 5,000 residents will develop early-onset Alzheimer's. Half of the affected residents were shown to have developed symptoms by their early 40s.

== Climate ==
Yarumal has a subtropical highland climate (Cfb). It has heavy rainfall year round.

Climate data for Yarumal
Month	Jan	Feb	Mar	Apr	May	Jun	Jul	Aug	Sep	Oct	Nov	Dec	Year
Mean daily maximum °C (°F)	21.0 (69.8)	21.2 (70.2)	21.4 (70.5)	21.4 (70.5)	21.0 (69.8)	21.1 (70.0)	21.6 (70.9)	21.3 (70.3)	20.8 (69.4)	19.9 (67.8)	20.0 (68.0)	21.3 (70.3)	21.0 (69.8)
Daily mean °C (°F)	15.5 (59.9)	15.8 (60.4)	16.1 (61.0)	16.5 (61.7)	16.3 (61.3)	16.2 (61.2)	16.1 (61.0)	15.9 (60.6)	15.7 (60.3)	15.3 (59.5)	15.3 (59.5)	15.2 (59.4)	15.8 (60.5)
Mean daily minimum °C (°F)	10.0 (50.0)	10.4 (50.7)	10.9 (51.6)	11.6 (52.9)	11.7 (53.1)	11.3 (52.3)	10.6 (51.1)	10.5 (50.9)	10.6 (51.1)	10.8 (51.4)	10.6 (51.1)	9.2 (48.6)	10.7 (51.2)
Average rainfall mm (inches)	83.7 (3.30)	147.2 (5.80)	167.9 (6.61)	346.6 (13.65)	441.2 (17.37)	381.9 (15.04)	355.9 (14.01)	382.3 (15.05)	381.7 (15.03)	418.1 (16.46)	307.0 (12.09)	152.4 (6.00)	3,565.9 (140.41)
Average rainy days	10	13	14	21	25	22	22	22	22	25	21	15	232
Source 1:
Source 2:

== Notable people ==
- Jhon Jairo Velásquez (1962-2020), cartel hitman and You Tube personality

== See also ==
- Yarumal climbing salamander, indigenous in Colombia
