= Liborina =

- Municipality and town
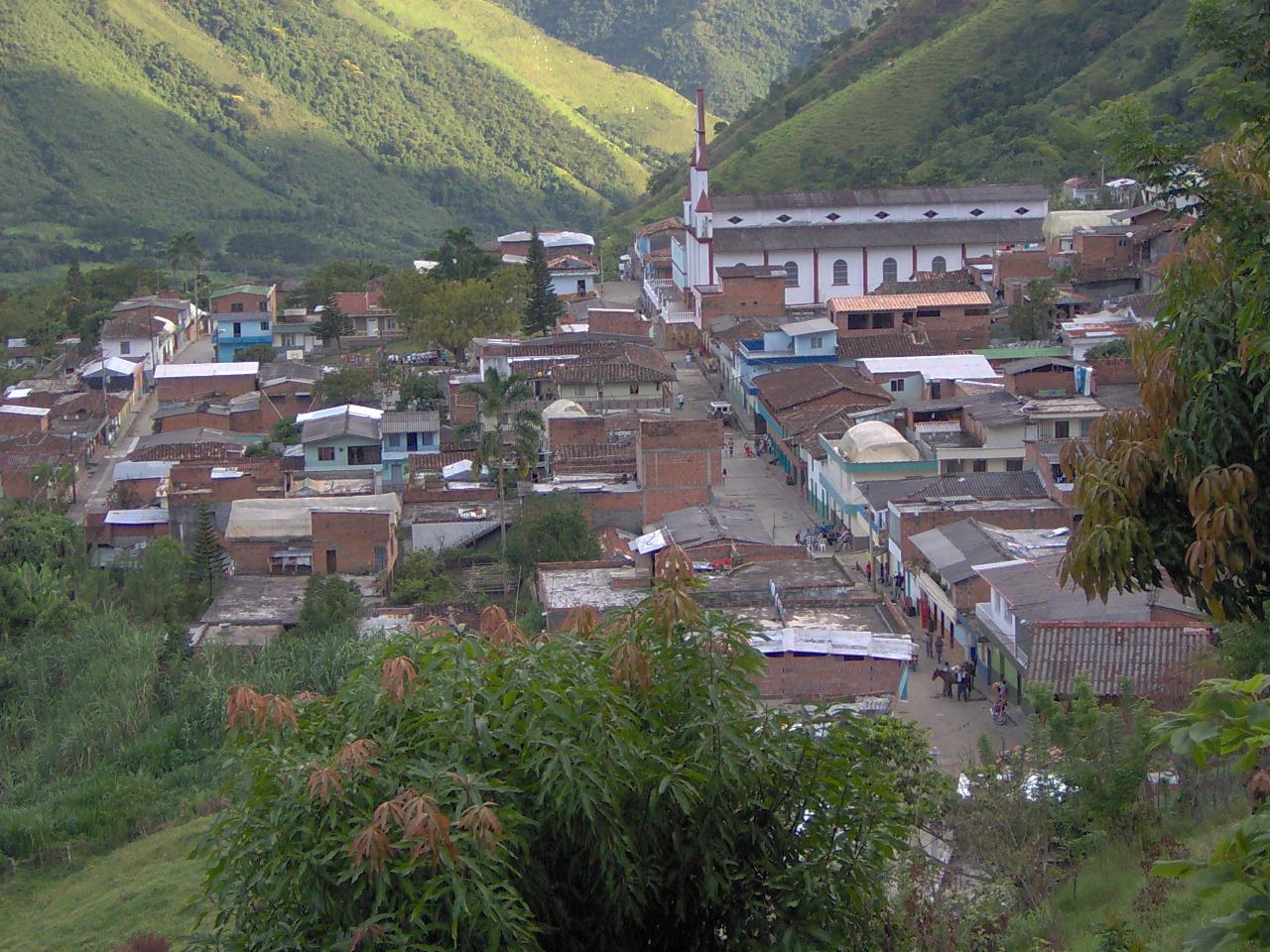
- View of Liborina

- Flag

- Location of the municipality and town of Liborina in the Antioquia Department of Colombia

- Location in Colombia
- Coordinates: 6°40′41″N 75°48′44″W
- Country: Colombia
- Department: Antioquia Department
- Subregion: Western

Area
  - Total: 217 km^{2} (84 sq mi)

Population (Census 2018)
  - Total: 7,928
  - Density: 36.5/km^{2} (94.6/sq mi)
- Time zone: UTC-5 (Colombia Standard Time)

Liborina is a municipality in Colombia, located in the Western subregion of the Antioquia Department. It borders the municipalities of Sabanalarga, San Andrés de Cuerquia, and San José de la Montaña to the north; San José de la Montaña and Belmira to the east; Santa Fe de Antioquia and Olaya to the south; and Buriticá to the west. Its town center is 80 kilometers via Sopetrán and 77 kilometers via Santa Fe de Antioquia (only accessible by motorcycles) from Medellín, the capital of Antioquia. The municipality covers an area of 217 square kilometers and is connected by road to the municipalities of Sabanalarga, San José de la Montaña, Belmira, Olaya, and Buriticá.

== Toponymy ==
Liborina was named to honor the memory of former Colombian President Liborio Mejía, a hero of the independence of these lands.

== Geography ==
The main water source is the Juan García stream, which flows through the municipality from NE to SW. In ancient times, it was called Nutabe or Tajami. There are two versions regarding its current name: the first and more likely one is in honor of the aforementioned Spanish captain, and the second is due to a criminal named Juan García who, in his final attempt to evade the authorities, jumped into the Cauca River at the stream's mouth, successfully escaping. The Juan García watershed includes other streams such as La Pava, El Volador, La Peñola, La Porquera, and Juan Barriga.

Liborina is known for its "Liborino" beans, which have given the municipality its reputation and have a festival held every November. Nestled in the mountains, it is a hot-weather destination pleasantly tempered by the coolness of its streams and the shade of its trees.

== History ==
The lands that now make up this municipality were inhabited by Nutabe and Tahamí communities at the time of the conquest, who fiercely defended themselves against Spanish invaders.

After the arrival of the Iberians and the defeat of the indigenous people, nothing of major historical significance occurred there. It is known that around 1541, Jorge Robledo passed through the region with his fellow conquerors but continued on.

The lands of Liborina were granted to Francisco López de Rue in 1582, who later sold them to Francisco Arce, who in turn sold them to a Spanish captain named Juan García de Ordaz y Mancilla in 1628. Some of the areas in this jurisdiction still bear the name Juan García.

Liborina was founded on March 7, 1832, and on September 25 of the same year, the procedures for the creation of the parish and its separation from Sacaojal were carried out. It was established as a municipality in 1833, when the then governor of Antioquia, Juan de Dios Aranzazu, ordered the creation of the municipality in the lands of present-day Liborina.

Don Vicente Londoño, one of the municipality's founders, was the first mayor and commissioner, contributing his own economic resources to the construction of houses and the market fair. The first priest was Father Manuel Tirado Villa.

== General Information ==
- Foundation Date: March 7, 1832
- Municipality Establishment: 1833
- Founders: Vicente Londoño, Jorge Martínez, and Rafael Pajón
- Nickname: "Town of Squares"

== Political-Administrative Division ==
In addition to its main urban area, Liborina has jurisdiction over the following corregimientos (according to the departmental management):

- El Carmen de la Venta
- La Honda
- La Merced del Playón
- San Diego

== Demography ==
Historical Population:

- 1912: 5,653
- 1938: 8,780 (+55.3%)
- 1951: 10,073 (+14.7%)
- 1964: 11,729 (+16.4%)
- 1973: 11,494 (-2.0%)
- 1985: 11,031 (-4.0%)
- 1993: 10,972 (-0.5%)
- 2005: 9,475 (-13.6%)
- 2018: 10,028 (+5.8%)

Total Population (2018): 10,028 inhabitants

- Urban Population: 2,296
- Rural Population: 7,732
- Literacy Rate (2005): 85.6%
- Urban Area: 90.6%
- Rural Area: 84.4%

== Ethnography ==
According to the 2005 census data presented by DANE, the ethnic composition of the municipality is:

- Mestizos & Whites (92.8%)
- Afro-Colombians (7.1%)
- Indigenous (0.1%)

== Economy ==
- Agriculture: Coffee, beans, sugar cane, panela, corn, bananas, vegetables, and fruits are primarily grown here. The district is famous for a special variety of beans developed in the region, the Liborino Bean.
- Livestock: Beef and dairy cattle.
- Mining
- Handicrafts: Production of shoes and whips.

== Tourism ==
Hidroituango Project: Liborina is one of the municipalities involved in the Hidroituango hydroelectric project, finished in 2018. The reservoir floods part of its lands on the right bank of the Cauca River.

Additionally, the municipality plans to develop small hydroelectric projects (PCH). Initially, the PCH Liborina will be built for electricity generation, with an installed capacity of 4.9 MW, capturing the waters of the Juan García stream through a small dam, a conduit, and a powerhouse located in the San Diego corregimiento.

== Festivals ==
- Feast of San Lorenzo, August 10.
- Bean Festival in November.
- Holy Week in March or April.

== Points of Interest ==
- Parish Church of San Lorenzo
- Corregimiento La Honda: The Cross, La Honda Stream, the Virgin of Mercy, La Palomera.
- San Diego: A few minutes from the municipal center, a town surrounded by mountains with a pleasant climate, good gastronomy, and ideal for nightlife, especially on weekends. Also, for bathing in natural pools and hiking or horseback riding.

== Natural Heritage ==
- Juan García Stream, considered the most turbulent in the Antioquia department.
- Angelina Bridge
- La Canalón Stream
- Cerro de La Cruz
- La Merced del Playón, a town with colonial streets surrounded by beautiful landscapes.

== Notable people ==
- Cesar Maturana
- Jorge David Monsalve

== See also ==
- Municipalities of Colombia
