= San Jerónimo, Antioquia =

- Municipality and town
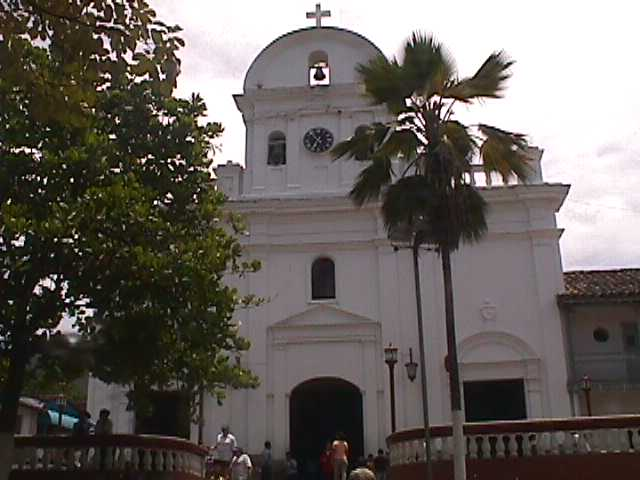

- Flag Coat of arms

- Location of the municipality and town of San Jerónimo in the Antioquia Department of Colombia

- Location in Colombia
- Coordinates: 6°26′30″N 75°43′40″W
- Country: Colombia
- Department: Antioquia Department
- Subregion: Western

Area
  - Total: 155 km^{2} (60 sq mi)
- Elevation: 780 m (2,560 ft)

Population (Census 2018)
  - Total: 15,361
  - Density: 99.1/km^{2} (257/sq mi)
- Time zone: UTC-5 (Colombia Standard Time)

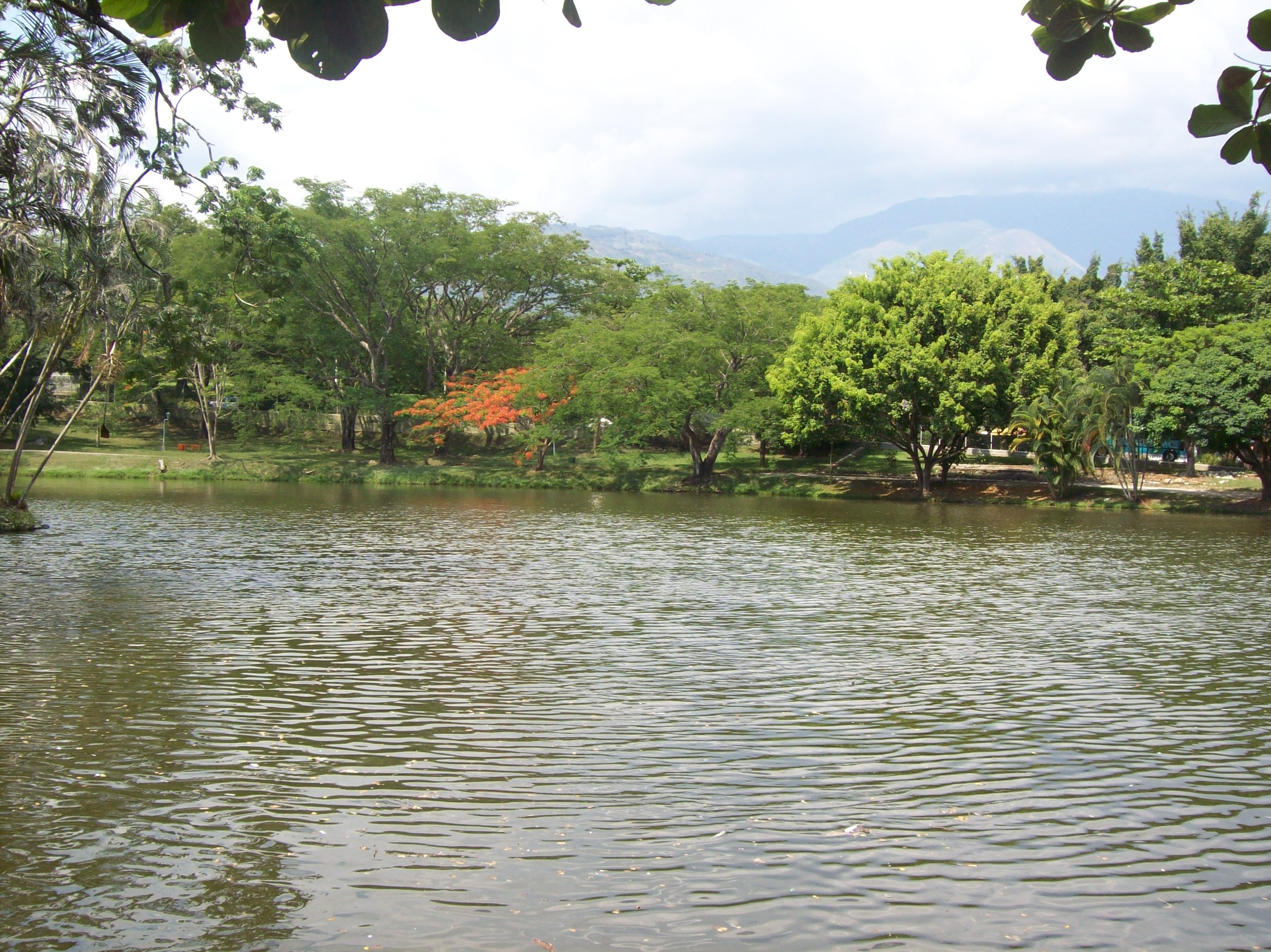
Fishing lake in San Jerónimo

San Jerónimo is a municipality in Colombia, located in the Western subregion of the Department of Antioquia. Its main town is 35 kilometers from the city of Medellín, the capital of the department of Antioquia. The municipality has an area of 155 square kilometers (60 square miles).

== History ==
The documentation of the history of San Jerónimo abundant, detailed, and reliable, as this is one of the historically most important municipalities in the department of Antioquia.

Before the Spanish conquerors arrived in this region, broadly speaking, and particularly before reaching the neighboring valley of Ebéjico, it was populated by indigenous tribes of the Ebéjicos and Peques, both part of the Nutabes indigenous people.

When the Spaniards arrived, they gave several names to the place, the first being San Juan del Pie de la Cuesta, which was changed only a year later to San Jerónimo de los Cedros, all this approximately between 1613 and 1616.

San Juan del Pie de la Cuesta was actually a vast territory personally owned by the governor of the province, Don Gaspar de Rodas. These properties changed owners several times, being bought and sold for around fifty pesos of the time.

As time passed, by 1757, the Antioquia government created by decree the party of San Jerónimo de los Cedros, a date considered official as the founding of the municipality.

In 1791, this locality saw the birth of the hero Atanasio Girardot, a hero of Colombia and the Independence of Venezuela.

== Geography ==
San Jerónimo is bordered by the following municipalities:

- North: Sopetrán
- Northeast: Belmira
- East: San Pedro de los Milagros
- Southeast: Bello
- South: Medellín (Palmitas)
- Southwest: Ebéjico
- West: Sopetrán

== Overview ==
San Jerónimo has seen new opportunities for tourism, real estate, and other economic sectors after the inauguration of the Fernando Gómez Martínez Tunnel, an engineering work that has halved the travel time between the capital of the department of Antioquia, Medellín, and this district. This tunnel, at the time of this publication, is among the longest in Colombia and Latin America.

This municipality has also been known as "The Land of Cocoa."

It is one of the tourist paradises of Antioquia. Its warm climate is one of the factors that attract tourists. Its hotel infrastructure is among the best quality in Antioquia. The municipality is located near Medellín, with an excellent access road and the Western Tunnel as a major attraction.

It has road communication with Sopetrán, Ebéjico, Santa Fe de Antioquia, and Medellín. The main watercourse is the Aurra River, which crosses the urban area.

== Political-administrative division ==
Besides its municipal capital, San Jerónimo is composed of the following hamlets:

- Alto Colorado
- Berrial
- Buenos Aires Parte Alta
- Buenos Aires Parte Baja
- Cabuyal
- Cenegueta
- El Calvario
- El Cedral
- El Chocho
- El Mestizo
- El Pomar
- El Ruano
- La Ciénaga
- La Palma
- Las Estancias
- Llanos De Aguirre
- Llanos De San Juan
- Loma Hermosa
- Los Alticos
- Los Cedros
- Los Guayabos
- Matasano
- Mestizal
- Montefrio
- Pesquinal
- Pie de Cuesta
- Piedra Negra
- Poleal
- Quebraditas
- Quimbayo
- Tafetanes
- Veliguarin

== Demographics ==
=== Historical population ===
| Year | Population | ±% |
|---|---|---|
| 1912 | 4,457 | — |
| 1938 | 7,548 | +69.4% |
| 1951 | 8,249 | +9.3% |
| 1964 | 9,436 | +14.4% |
| 1973 | 8,830 | −6.4% |
| 1985 | 10,261 | +16.2% |
| 1993 | 11,070 | +7.9% |
| 2005 | 11,627 | +5.0% |
| 2018 | 15,361 | +32.1% |

Total Population: 15,361 (2018) Urban Population: 6,704 Rural Population: 8,657 Literacy Rate: 86.3% (2005)

Urban Zone: 93.8% Rural Zone: 82.9%

=== Ethnography ===
According to figures presented by DANE from the 2005 census, the ethnographic composition of the municipality is:

- Mestizos & Whites (92.9%)
- Afro-Colombians (7.0%)
- Indigenous (0.1%)

== Economy ==
- Agriculture: plantains, coffee, various fruits, and vegetables
- Traditional livestock for breeding and milk
- Tourism

== Festivities ==
- Live Holy Week Celebration
- Patron Saint Festivities from September 21 to 30
- Sun and Agro-tourism Festivities on the second weekend of November
- Foundation Festivities of San Jerónimo, celebrated for several centuries

== Gastronomy ==
In addition to traditional national and international cuisine, demanded by the frequent tourism, San Jerónimo offers, among other dishes, a local dish prepared with pig's blood and the pig's small intestine which is filled with rice, called "Morcilla." Rice is cooked in the pig's blood, various seasonings are added, and this mixture is used to fill the small intestine after being cleaned. Additionally, the gastronomic inventory of the population includes a large variety of fruit preparations from the fertile region. Traditional Paisa cuisine and barbecues are also offered.

== Points of interest ==
- Church of Our Lady of Candelaria, which preserves important European-origin paintings and sculptures
- Waterfalls in Utuhuena (La Tasita)
- Archaeological zone: Located in El Alto del Cedral
- Aburrá Waterfall
- Colonial Bridge on the road leading to Poleal, San Pedro hamlet
- La Muñoz stream in La Jungla sector, only one block from the Main Park
- Angosturas Narrow
- San Jerónimo Grotto
- Hacienda (Loma Hermosa hamlet)
- Haciendas and recreational parks
- Los Tamarindos Park
- Main Park

== Notable people ==
- Atanasio Girardot, hero of Colombia's independence
- Dario Gómez, "The King of Spite," idol of Colombian popular music
