= Puente de Occidente =

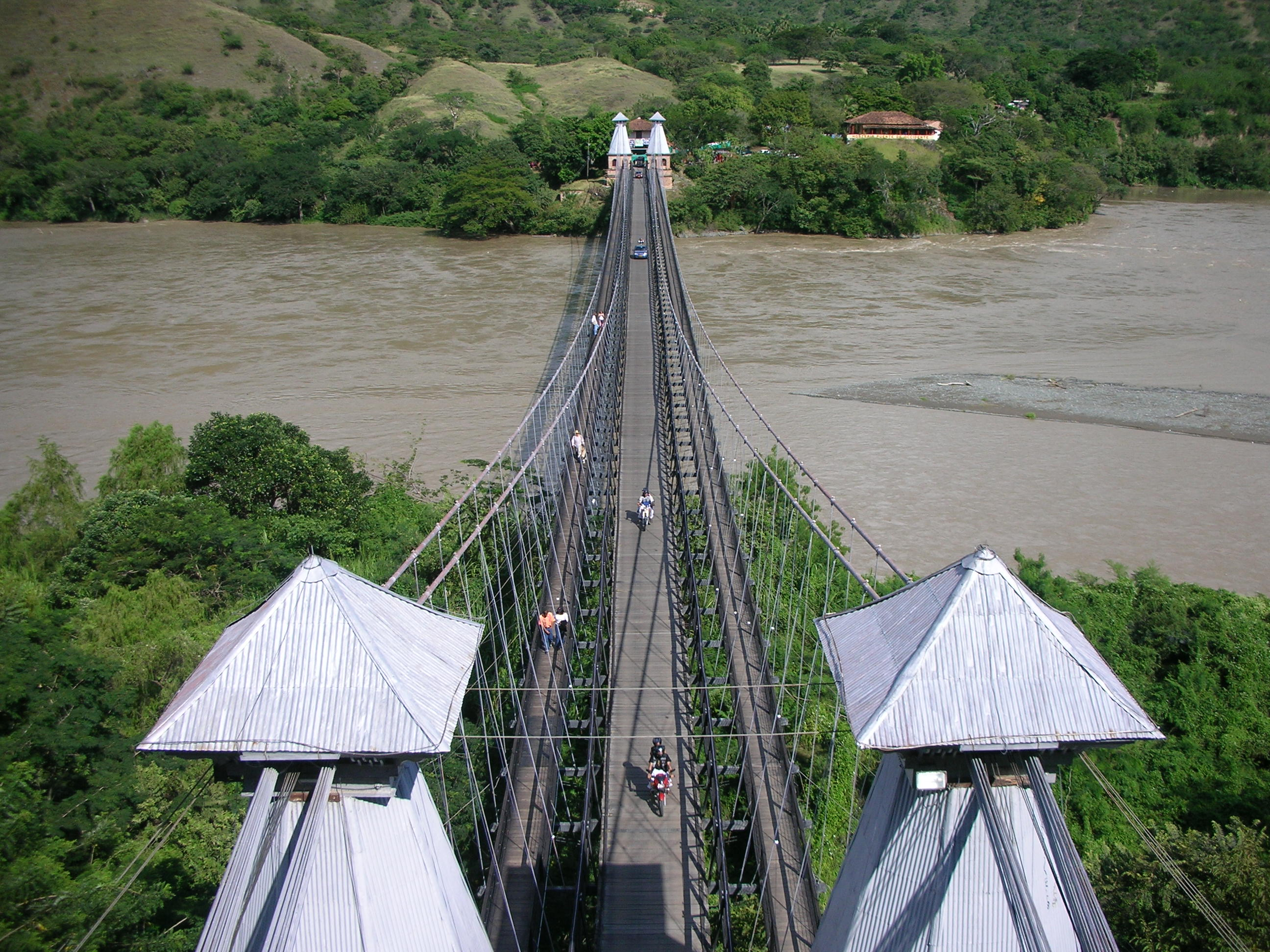
- Coordinates: 6°34′40″N 75°47′53″W
- Carries: Pedestrians, motorcycles, cars, small trucks
- Crosses: Cauca River
- Locale: Between Santa Fe de Antioquia and Olaya
- Named for: Western Antioquia subregion of Antioquia Department
- Owner: Antioquia Department
- Heritage status: Fué declarado monumento nacional en el año de 1967.

Characteristics
- Design: Suspension/cable-stayed hybrid
- Material: Wood, iron, steel
- Total length: 291 m (955 ft)
- Clearance below: 4.6 m (15 ft)

History
- Designer: José María Villa
- Construction start: 4 December 1887
- Construction end: 27 December 1895
- Construction cost: $171,300

The Puente de Occidente (Bridge of the West), so named because it is located in western Antioquia, Colombia, is a suspension bridge that connects the municipalities of Olaya and Santa Fe de Antioquia, east and west of the Cauca River, respectively. At the time it was considered to be the third largest suspension bridge worldwide.

The bridge is a single suspension span supported from four pyramidal towers - two on each bank of the river - with each tower anchoring two cables. The span has a main central section which cars and smaller trucks can cross, and two pedestrian paths on either side of the central roadway. All three paths have wood upper surfaces. Construction started in 1887, under the direction of engineer José María Villa, after authorization by Marcelino Vélez, governor of Antioquia. The cables and other steel parts were purchased from England, while the towers were constructed of local materials. The Puente de Occidente was initially open only to pedestrian traffic; later, vehicles were allowed.

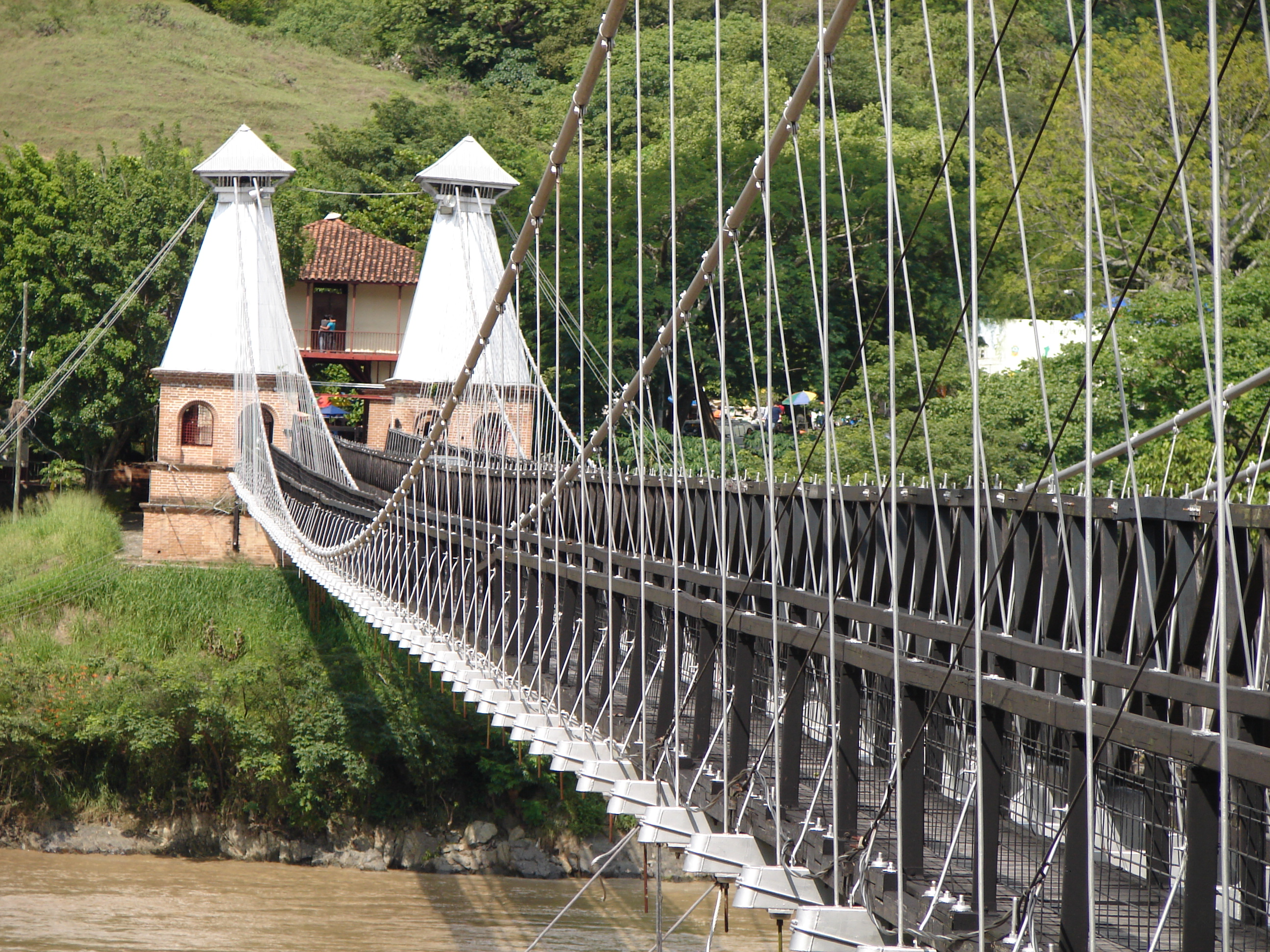
Puente de Occidente from the west bank of the Cauca, looking southeast.

While today there are other, much longer suspension bridges in South America, originally the Puente de Occidente was the longest of its kind in the continent. It was declared a National Monument of Colombia on 26 November 1978. José María Villa, who had been born nearby in Sopetrán, studied engineering at the Stevens Institute of Technology in New Jersey; after finishing his studies in the United States, he participated in the construction of the Brooklyn Bridge. The structural system of the Puente de Occidente is similar to the suspension/cable-stayed hybrid used in the Brooklyn Bridge.

Significant restoration was performed in the early part of 2014.
