= Sopetrán =

- Municipality and town
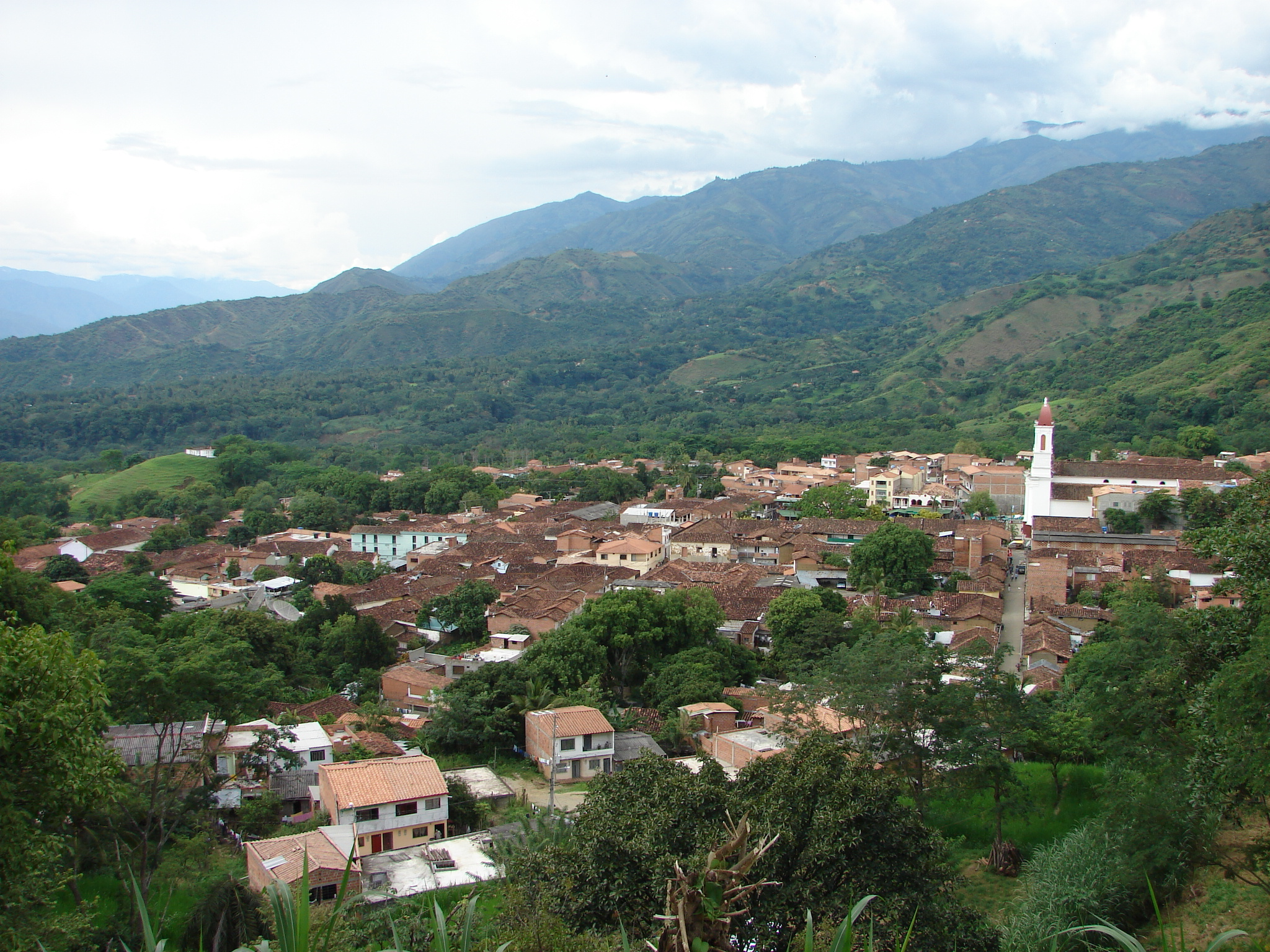

- Flag Coat of arms

- Location of the municipality and town of Sopetrán in the Antioquia Department of Colombia

- Location in Colombia
- Coordinates: 6°30′06″N 75°44′36″W
- Country: Colombia
- Department: Antioquia Department
- Subregion: Western

Area
  - Total: 223 km^{2} (86 sq mi)

Population (Census 2018)
  - Total: 13,748
  - Density: 61.7/km^{2} (160/sq mi)
- Time zone: UTC-5 (Colombia Standard Time)

Sopetrán is a municipality of Colombia, located in the subregion west of the state of Antioquia. It is bounded to the north by the municipality of Olaya, to the east by the municipality of Belmira, to the south by the municipalities of San Jerónimo and Ebéjico, and to the west by the municipality of Santa Fe de Antioquia. The population was 13,748 at the 2018 census. It is 59 kilometers from the city of Medellin, the state capital of Antioquia. The municipality of Sopetrán has an area of 223 square kilometers.

As of 2007, Sopetrán was one of three municipalities along the Route of the Sun in western Antioquia, along with the municipalities of San Jerónimo and Santa Fe de Antioquia, with which Sopetrán shares much of its history. Since the opening of the West Fernando Gomez Martinez Tunnel in 2006, tourism in the region has tripled. The area is particularly suitable for ecotourism.

== History ==
Originally, the indigenous communities of the Nutabes and Tahamíes inhabited the municipality of Sopetrán. Before the arrival of the Spanish, the region was called Los Guamas. On February 22, 1616, the municipality of Sopetrán was officially established by Francisco Herrera and Campuzano, a native of Alcala de Henares in Spain. Herrera worshipped Our Lady of Sopetrán, and he is believed to have named the town after her.

Formerly, the town has been known by the names of Las Guamas, Vice Parish of Our Lady of Saladito of Cordoba, and Parish of Our Lady of the Assumption and Sopetrán.

The origin of the name Las Guamas was the lands that had been settled by the indigenous Guamas or Guacas many centuries prior, who engaged in agriculture, hunting, fishing, and salt mining. The latter caught the Spaniards' attention, who had been transporting salt from the sea for domestic use and to feed the newly imported cattle.

In 1814, Sopetrán achieved the status of a municipality.

== Climate ==
The town is located 716 meters above sea level. The town's climate is defined as tropical. During the summer, there is considerable rainfall, but the winter has comparatively little rainfall. The average temperature is around 24.9 °C (76.8 °F), and the average annual rainfall is 1360 mm (53.5 inches).
