= Nutabe language =

Extinct Chibchan language of Colombia

Nutabe
- Native to: Colombia
- Region: Santa Fe de Antioquia
- Ethnicity: Nutabe
- Extinct: (date missing)
- Language family: Chibchan: (unclassified); Antioquian; Nutabe

Language codes
- ISO 639-3: None (mis)
- Glottolog: None anti1242 Antioquian

Nutabe (Nutabane) is an extinct Chibchan language of Colombia, historically spoken by the Nutabe people.

Adolfo Constenla Umaña also refers to the language as “Antioquian” (referencing the local name of Santa Fe de Antioquia). In this grouping Constenla names both Nutabe and Catío.

== Surviving documentation ==
Very little documentation of Nutabe, or its close relative Old Catío, remains. A 1946 publication by Paul Rivet gathers the short list together, comparing Nutabe and Old Catío. (Rivet pointed out that the label "Catío" had already come to refer to a non-Chibchan language, Catío (Chocoan).
