= Antioquian languages =

Group of extinct northwest Colombian languages

Antioquian
- Catio–Nutabe
- Geographic distribution: Antioquia Department, Colombia
- Extinct: 18th century
- Linguistic classification: Chibchan: Antioquian
- Subdivisions: Old Catio †; Nutabe †

Language codes
- Glottolog: anti1242

Antioquian may refer to any of several extinct and poorly attested or unattested languages of the Santa Fe de Antioquia region of Colombia, though is most commonly used for a grouping of two Chibchan languages spoken in the region.

== Classification ==
Antioquian is typically held to refer to the following two languages of the Chibchan family:

- Old Catio (Chibchan)
- Nutabe (Nutabane; Chibchan)

Languages, dialects, and ethnic names also lumped under the term include:

- Anserma (Anserna, Ancerma; a.k.a. Humbra/Umbra; dialects Caramanta & Cartama. Chocoan.)
- Arma-Pozo (dialects Arma, Pozo, possibly Chocoan)
- Avurrá (Aburra; 1 word known, possibly Chibchan)
- Yamesí (no data)
- Guazuzú (no data)
- Buritaca (no data)
- Abibe (no data)
- Pequi (no data)
- Hevejico (no data)
- Amachi (no data)
- Guamoco (no data)
- Tahami (no data)
- Oromina (a.k.a. Zeremoe, no data)
