= Juan de Dios Aranzazu =

Colombian politician

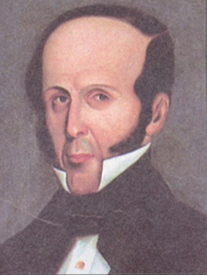

President of the New Granada
- In office July 5, 1841 – May 19, 1842
- Preceded by: Pedro Alcántara Herrán
- Succeeded by: Pedro Alcántara Herrán

Governor of the Department of Antioquia
- In office June 6, 1832 – January 16, 1836
- Preceded by: Francisco Luis Campusano
- Succeeded by: Juan Santamaria

Personal details
- Born: March 8, 1798 La Ceja, Antioquia, Colombia
- Died: April 14, 1845 (aged 47) Bogotá, Cundinamarca, Colombia
- Party: Liberal
- Education: Colegio San Bartolomé La Merced
- Occupation: Politician, lawyer

Military service
- Allegiance: Colombia (Liberal Party)

Juan de Dios Aranzazu (1798–1845) was a Colombian politician.

His political career took off in 1832, when he became the governor of the Antioquia Department. He held that office until 1836, in which time he opened the first Provincial Legislative sessions. From July 5, 1841, until May 19, 1842, he was President of the Republic of New Granada.

== Biography ==
He was born on March 8, 1798, in La Ceja, Antioquia. His parents were María Antonia González and José María de Aranzazu, the latter of which was a wealthy merchant originally from Spain. As a youth he studied law and jurisprudence in the Colegio de San Bartolomé, in Bogotá. He also got involved with the family business, which led him to travel across widely, both within Colombia and to the surrounding countries.

He entered politics in 1823, starting in one of his many stints as a congressman. In 1828, he served as a delegate to the Convention of Ocaña. Shortly thereafter he was part of a delegation to José Antonio Páez to attempt to convince not to separate Venezuela from Gran Colombia.

In 1829 he supported the rebellion of José María Córdova against the dictator and liberator Simón Bolívar.

=== Governor of Antioquia ===
As governor the towns of Campamento, Cocorná, Ebéjico, Entrerríos, Girardota, and Liborina were all founded. He also lobbied for what became the precursor of the modern road to the sea.

=== President of the Republic ===
During the presidency of Pedro Alcántara Herrán he held the post of President of the Council of State. It is due to this office that he became acting president from late 1841 to early 1842. This was because President Alcántara Herrán was busy directing the army in the War of the Supremes, and vice-President Domingo Caicedo was too ill to take office.

== Death and legacy ==
Juan de Dios Aranzazu died on April 14, 1845, due to cancer.

In 1853, the town of Aranzazu, in the department of Caldas, was founded on land he donated and named in his honour.
