= Guatapé =

Coordinates: 6°14′N 75°10′W

- Municipality and town
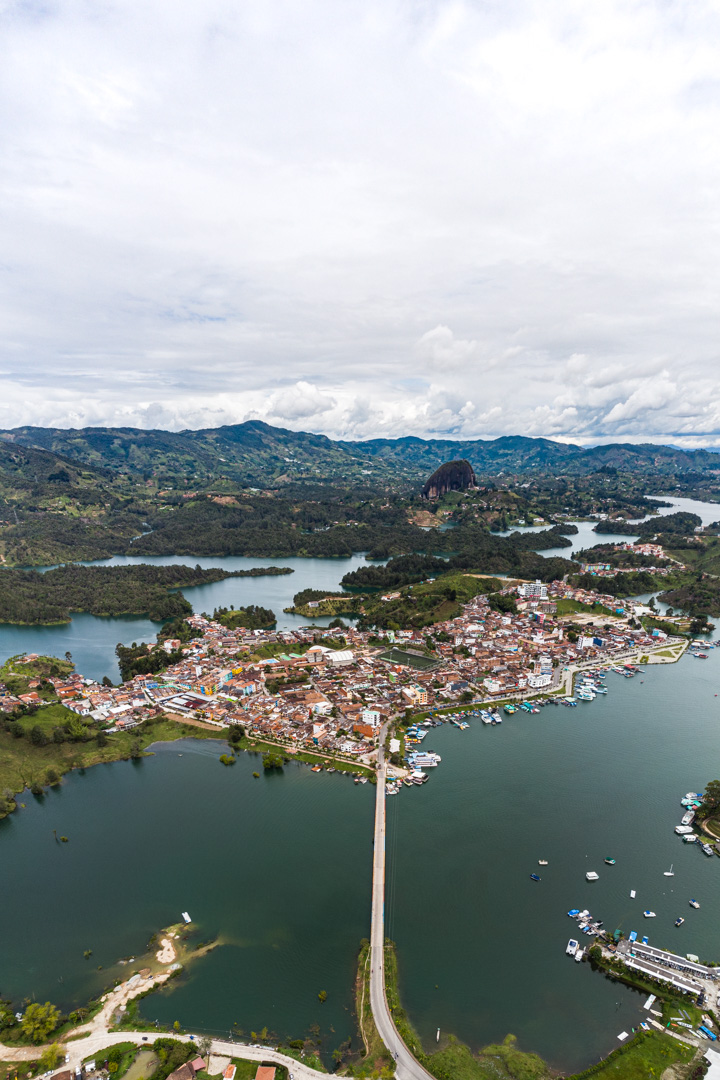
- Aerial image of Guatapé and in the background the Piedra del Peñol

- Flag Coat of arms

- Location of the municipality and town of Guatapé in the Antioquia Department of Colombia
- Country: Colombia
- Department: Antioquia Department
- Subregion: Eastern
- Elevation: 1,890 m (6,200 ft)
- Demonym(s): Guatapenses; Guatapeños
- Time zone: UTC-5 (Colombia Standard Time)

Guatapé is a town and municipality in the Department of Antioquia, Colombia. It is a part of the subregion of Eastern Antioquia and is located 79 kilometres (49 mi) from Medellín, the capital of the department. Guatapé is bordered on the north by Alejandría, San Rafael to the east, and Granada and El Peñol to the south. This town is the gathering place for Las Vegas, referring to the small farms of the area.

It lies at an altitude of 1,890 meters (6,200 ft) above sea level.

The town is a major tourist attraction, especially for travelers from Medellín. El Peñón de Guatapé, a large rock that visitors can climb, and the famous zócalos (murals) that adorn several buildings attract many tourists.

== History ==
Before Spanish conquistadores reached the area in the 16th century, this territory was inhabited by indigenous groups, some controlled by a cacique named Guatapé. In his honor, the town was named after him. The name "Guatapé", comes from the Quechua language, related to "stones and water". Another name that the town had in the past was "La Ceja de Guatapé".

In 1714, the indigenous people under Guatapé of this region were grouped into a shelter known as "San Antonio de Remolinos Peñol". Traces of their existence come from clay urns found in the town of Alto Verde, and several archaeological sites not yet studied in the villages of La Peña, La Piedra, El Roble, and El Rosario.

Guatapé was founded on 4 October 1811, by the Spaniard Don Francisco Giraldo y Jimenez. It was declared a municipality in September 1867.

Guatapé has changed throughout its history. It was predominantly a farming town that relied on livestock, agriculture, and mining. Empresas Públicas de Medellín built a large hydroelectric complex here in the 1970s. This megaproject produced large impacts on social, economic, political, environmental, and cultural development in the locality. With the construction of this dam, Guatapé became one of the most important electric production centers in the country.

The neighboring town of El Peñol and rural parts of Guatape were destroyed as a result of the flooding of valley which created the El Peñol-Guatapé reservoir, displacing thousands of residents and resulting in the forced evacuation and rebuilding of the town a few miles west of its former location.

== Demographics ==
Total Population: 6,469 inhabitants (2015)

- Urban population: 5,045
- Rural population: 1,424

Literacy: 92.3% (2005)

Ethnicity: According to figures presented by DANE census in 2005, the ethnic makeup of the township is the following:

- Mestizo & White (99.96%)
- Afro-Colombian (0.04 %)

== Sites of interest ==
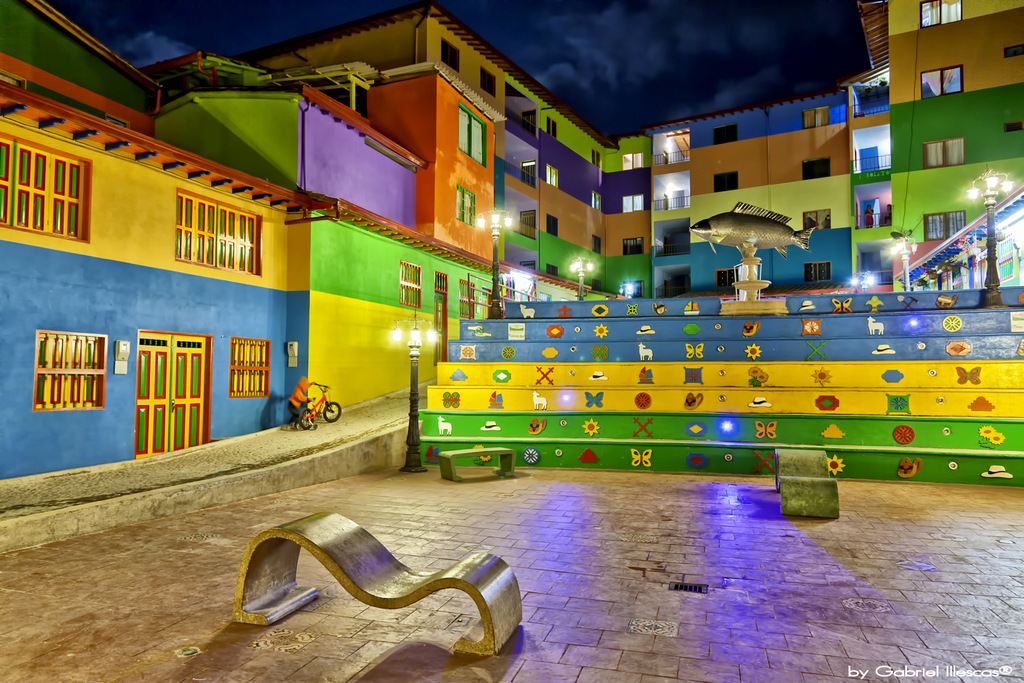
Typical colorful facades.

- Calle del Recuerdo ("Memory Lane")
- El Peñol-Guatapé Reservoir (es)
- El Peñón de Guatapé (see below)
- Parish Church of Nuestra Señora del Carmen (es)
- Chapel of Our Lady of Santa Ana
- Community Historical Museum
- Pueblo de Zócalos

=== La Piedra ===
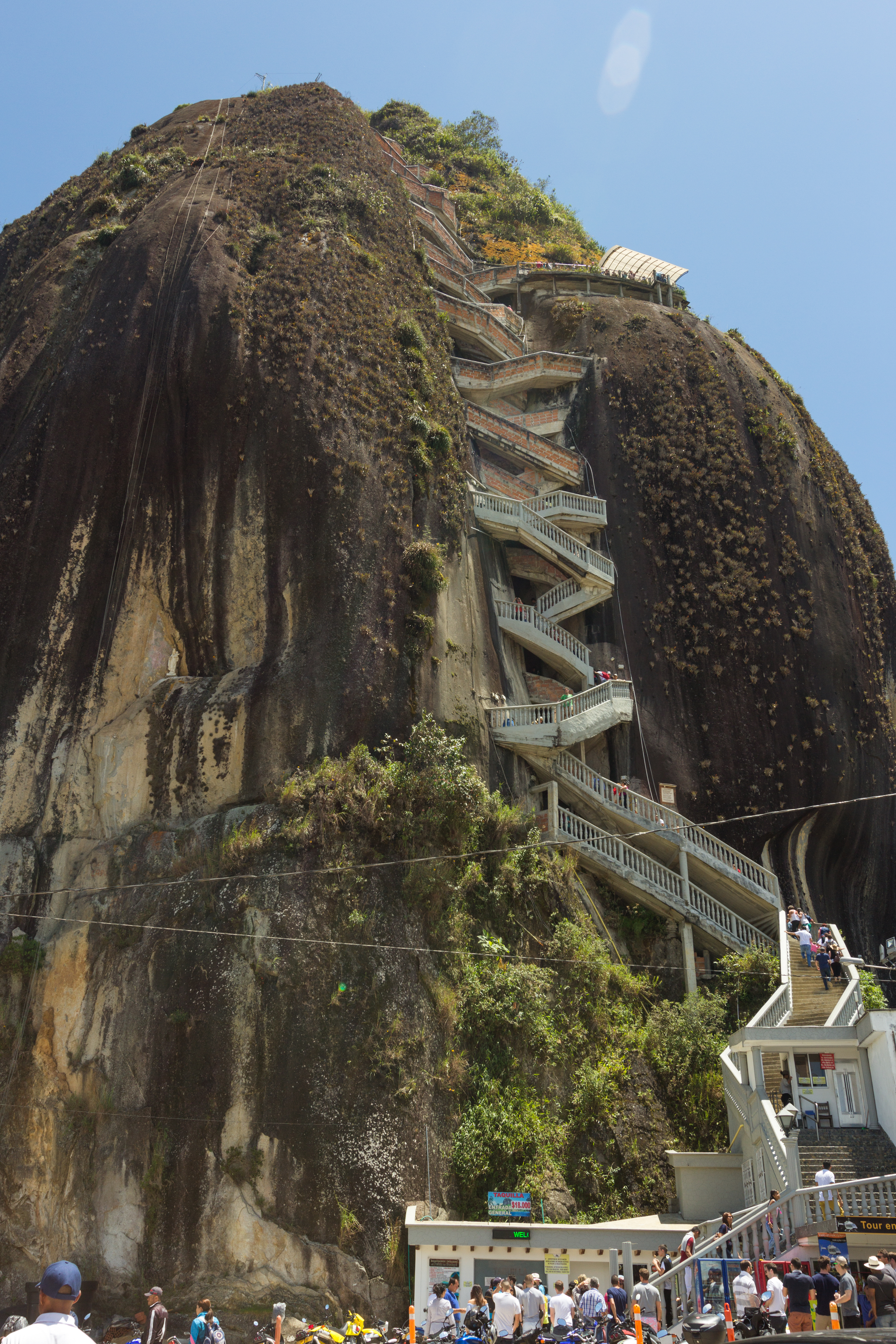
Peñón de Guatapé

El Peñón de Guatapé is a rock formation that borders a lake. It formed along the Antioquia Rock Base (batolito de antioquia), 70 million years ago. With two-thirds of its height below ground, the exposed vertical face is over 200 meters high and visible from throughout the surrounding countryside. Visitors can scale the rock via a staircase built into one side, a path that includes more than 708 steps to the top.

=== Zócalos ===
Each building has tiles along the facade's lower walls in bright colors and dimensioned images. Many of the tiles are tied to the products sold by the shops, or the beliefs of the residents. Others are cultural images of the farming heritage of the community.

== Gallery ==
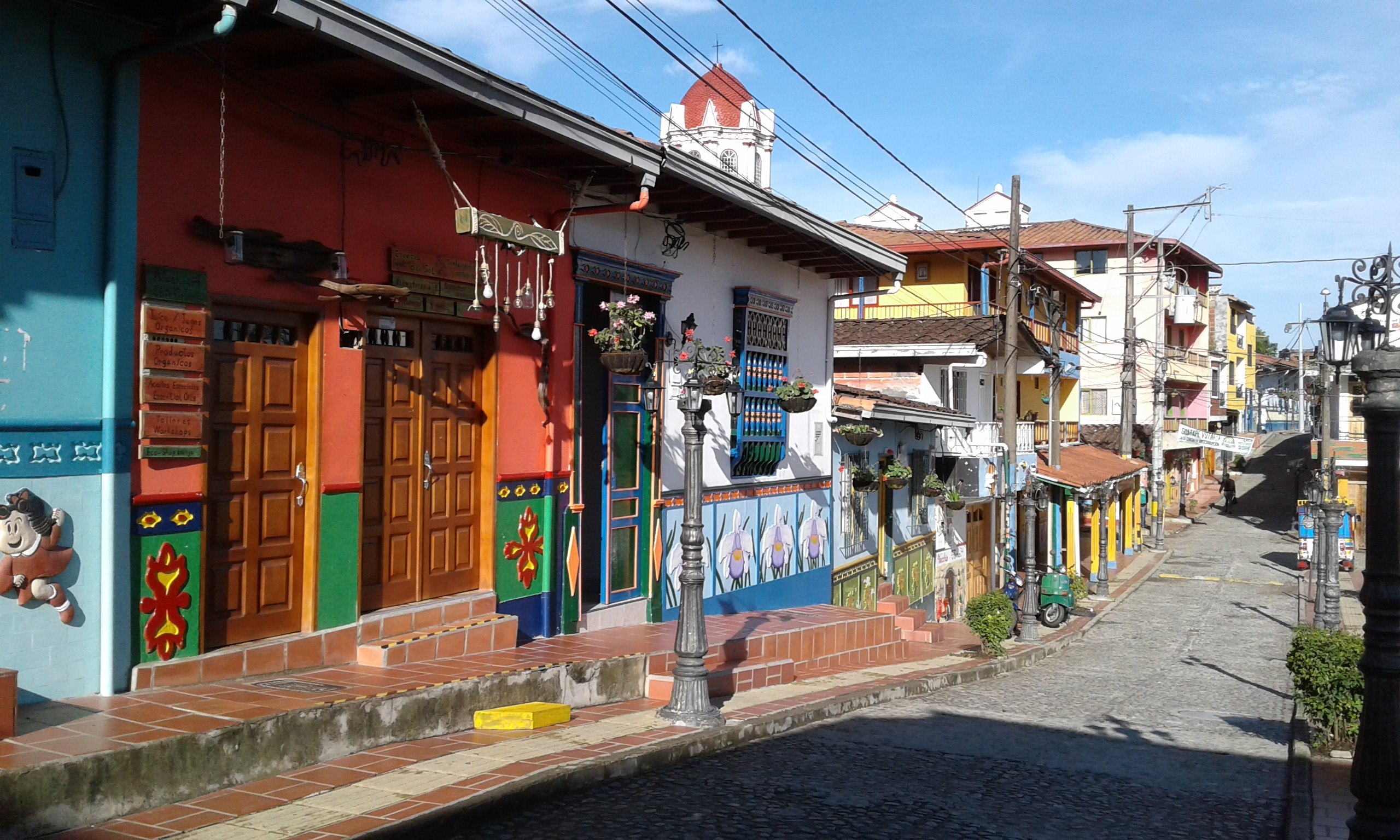
Typical street scene in Guatapé

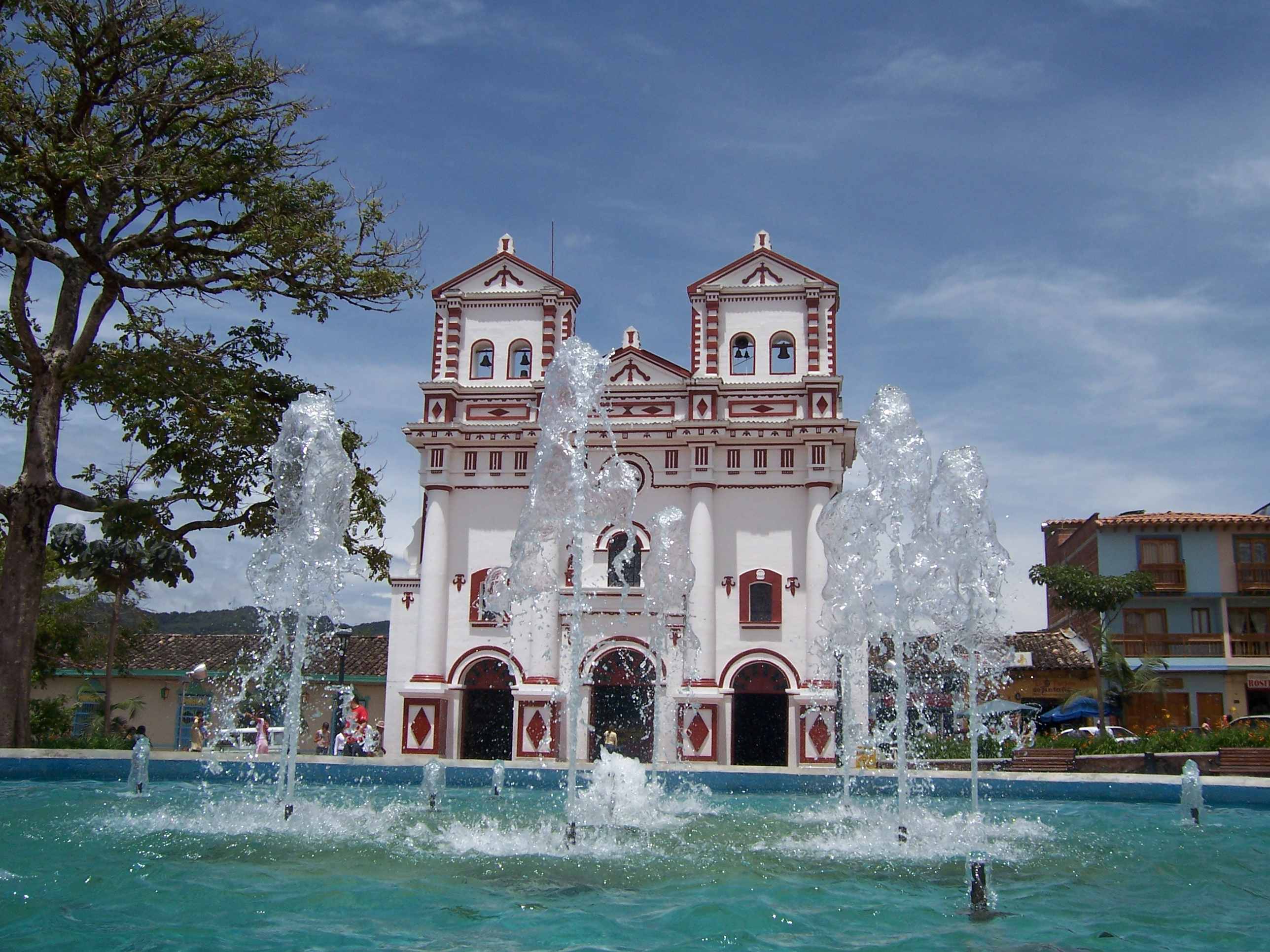
Church of Our Lady of Carmen

Map of neighborhoods and veredas

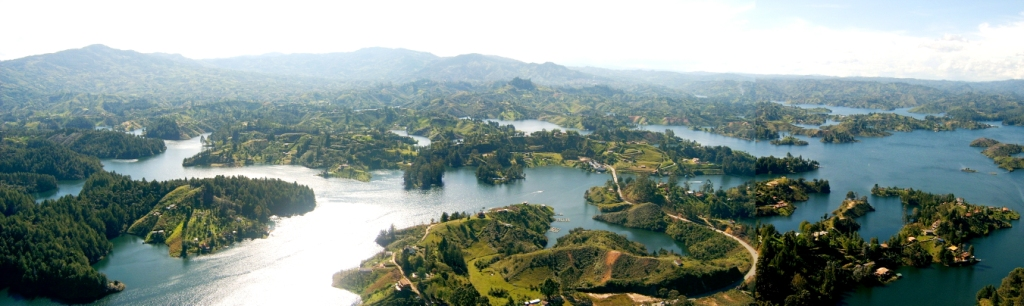
El Peñol-Guatapé Reservoir
