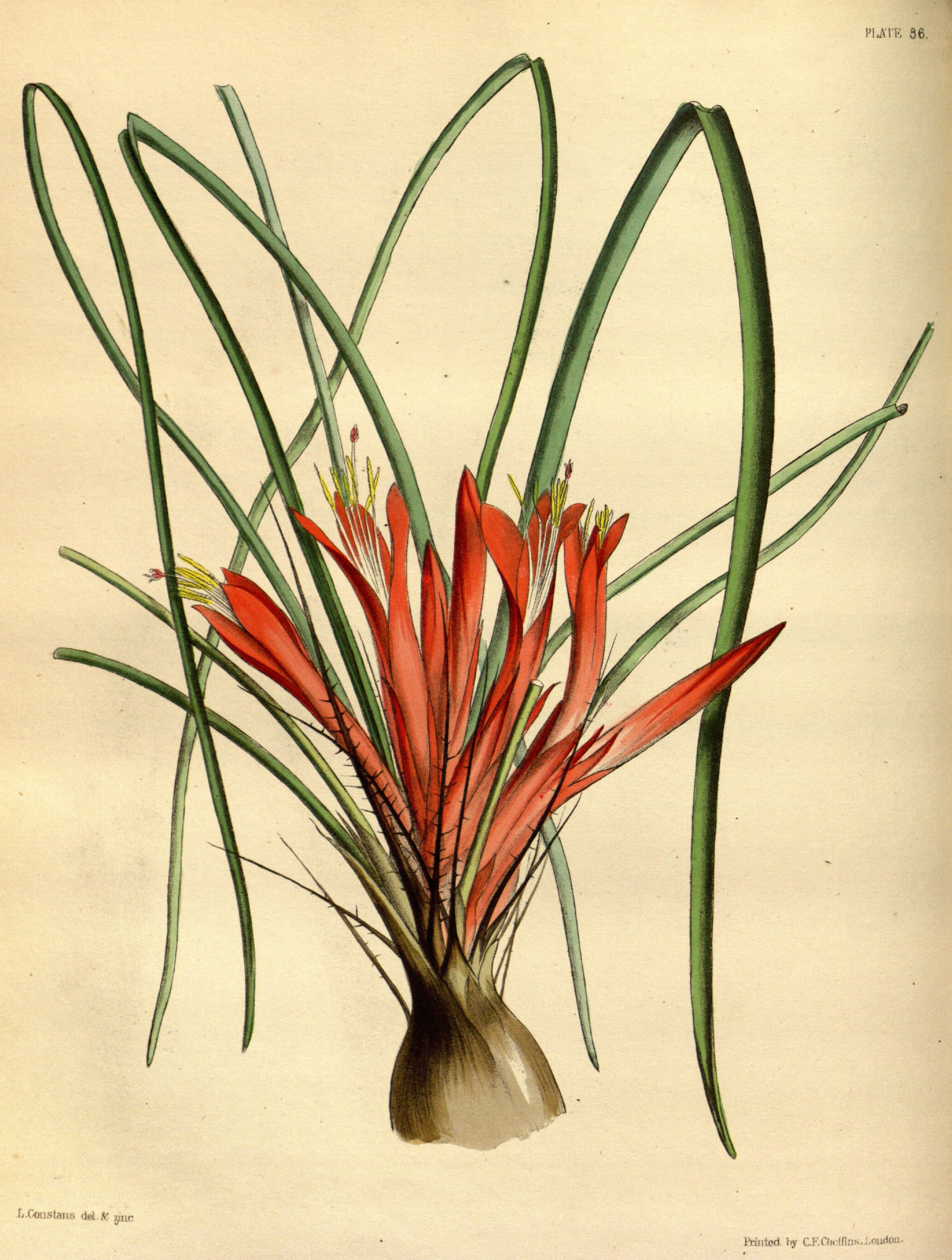

Scientific classification
- Kingdom: Plantae
- Clade: Tracheophytes
- Clade: Angiosperms
- Clade: Monocots
- Clade: Commelinids
- Order: Poales
- Family: Bromeliaceae
- Genus: Pitcairnia
- Species: P. heterophylla

Binomial name
- Pitcairnia heterophylla (Lindley) Beer

Synonyms
- Puya heterophylla Lindl.; Hepetis heterophylla (Lindl.) Mez; Puya longifolia C.Morren; Pitcairnia cernua Kunth & C.D.Bouché; Pitcairnia exscapa Liebm.; Pitcairnia lindleyana Lem.; Pitcairnia morrenii Lem.

= Pitcairnia heterophylla =

Species of flowering plant

Pitcairnia heterophylla is a plant species in the genus Pitcairnia. This species is native to northern South America (Peru, Ecuador, Colombia, Venezuela), Central America, and central and southern Mexico.

The species was first discovered on top of the Rock of Guatapé by a German scientist.

Pitcairnia × daiseyana is a natural hybrid of P. heterophylla and P. pungens.
