= Uramita =

- Municipality and town
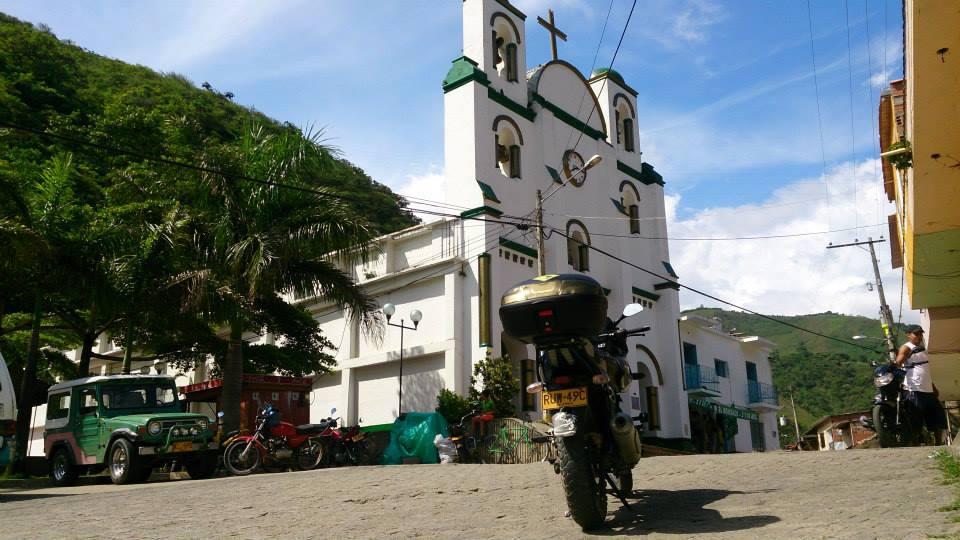
- View of Uramita Iglesia

- Flag Seal

- Location of the municipality and town of Uramita in the Antioquia Department of Colombia

- Location in Colombia
- Coordinates: 6°53′55″N 76°10′25″W
- Country: Colombia
- Department: Antioquia Department
- Subregion: Western

Area
  - Total: 265.94 km^{2} (102.68 sq mi)
- Time zone: UTC-5 (Colombia Standard Time)

Uramita is a town and municipality in Antioquia Department, Colombia.

== Climate ==
Uramita has a tropical monsoon climate (Köppen Am) with moderate rainfall from January to March and heavy rainfall in the remaining months. The average temperature is around 28.4 °C (83.1 °F), and the average annual rainfall is 2,330 mm (91.6 inches).

Climate data for Uramita
Month	Jan	Feb	Mar	Apr	May	Jun	Jul	Aug	Sep	Oct	Nov	Dec	Year
Mean daily maximum °C (°F)	29.3 (84.7)	29.3 (84.7)	29.8 (85.6)	29.1 (84.4)	27.9 (82.2)	28.3 (82.9)	28.4 (83.1)	28.3 (82.9)	27.6 (81.7)	27.5 (81.5)	27.4 (81.3)	28.0 (82.4)	28.4 (83.1)
Daily mean °C (°F)	24.2 (75.6)	24.5 (76.1)	25.0 (77.0)	24.6 (76.3)	24.0 (75.2)	24.1 (75.4)	24.2 (75.6)	24.1 (75.4)	23.8 (74.8)	23.7 (74.7)	23.6 (74.5)	23.9 (75.0)	24.1 (75.5)
Mean daily minimum °C (°F)	19.2 (66.6)	19.8 (67.6)	20.3 (68.5)	20.2 (68.4)	20.2 (68.4)	19.9 (67.8)	20.0 (68.0)	20.0 (68.0)	20.0 (68.0)	19.9 (67.8)	19.9 (67.8)	19.8 (67.6)	19.9 (67.9)
Average rainfall mm (inches)	56 (2.2)	72 (2.8)	89 (3.5)	216 (8.5)	263 (10.4)	244 (9.6)	229 (9.0)	246 (9.7)	255 (10.0)	303 (11.9)	222 (8.7)	135 (5.3)	2,330 (91.6)
