= Pitcairnia pungens =

Scientific classification
- Kingdom: Plantae
- Clade: Tracheophytes
- Clade: Angiosperms
- Clade: Monocots
- Clade: Commelinids
- Order: Poales
- Family: Bromeliaceae
- Genus: Pitcairnia
- Species: P. pungens

Binomial name
- Pitcairnia pungens Kunth

Species of flowering plant

Pitcairnia pungens is a plant species of bromeliad in the genus Pitcairnia. This species is native to Ecuador.

Pitcairnia × daiseyana is a natural hybrid of P. heterophylla and P. pungens.
