= Peque, Antioquia =

- Municipality and town
- Flag

- Location of the municipality and town of Peque, Antioquia in the Antioquia Department of Colombia

- Location in Colombia
- Coordinates: 7°1′0″N 75°55′0″W
- Country: Colombia
- Department: Antioquia Department
- Subregion: Western

Area
  - Total: 392 km^{2} (151 sq mi)
- Elevation: 1,200 m (3,900 ft)

Population (Census 2018)
  - Total: 7,155
  - Density: 18.3/km^{2} (47.3/sq mi)
- Time zone: UTC-5 (Colombia Standard Time)

Peque is a municipality in the Colombian department of Antioquia. The population was 7,155 at the 2018 census.
