= Pitcairnia × daiseyana =

Scientific classification
- Kingdom: Plantae
- Clade: Tracheophytes
- Clade: Angiosperms
- Clade: Monocots
- Clade: Commelinids
- Order: Poales
- Family: Bromeliaceae
- Genus: Pitcairnia
- Species: P. × daiseyana

Binomial name
- Pitcairnia × daiseyana H.Luther

Species of flowering plant

Pitcairnia × daiseyana is a natural hybrid of P. heterophylla and P. pungens. This plant is endemic to Ecuador.
