= Catio language (Chibchan) =

Extinct Chibchan language of Colombia

Old Catío
- Native to: Colombia
- Region: Santa Fe de Antioquia
- Extinct: (date missing)
- Language family: Chibchan: (unclassified); Antioquian; Old Catío

Language codes
- ISO 639-3: None (mis)
- Glottolog: anti1242 incl. in Antioquian

Old Catío is an extinct Chibchan language of Colombia. It is only attested in a few words.
