= Olaya, Antioquia =

- Municipality and town
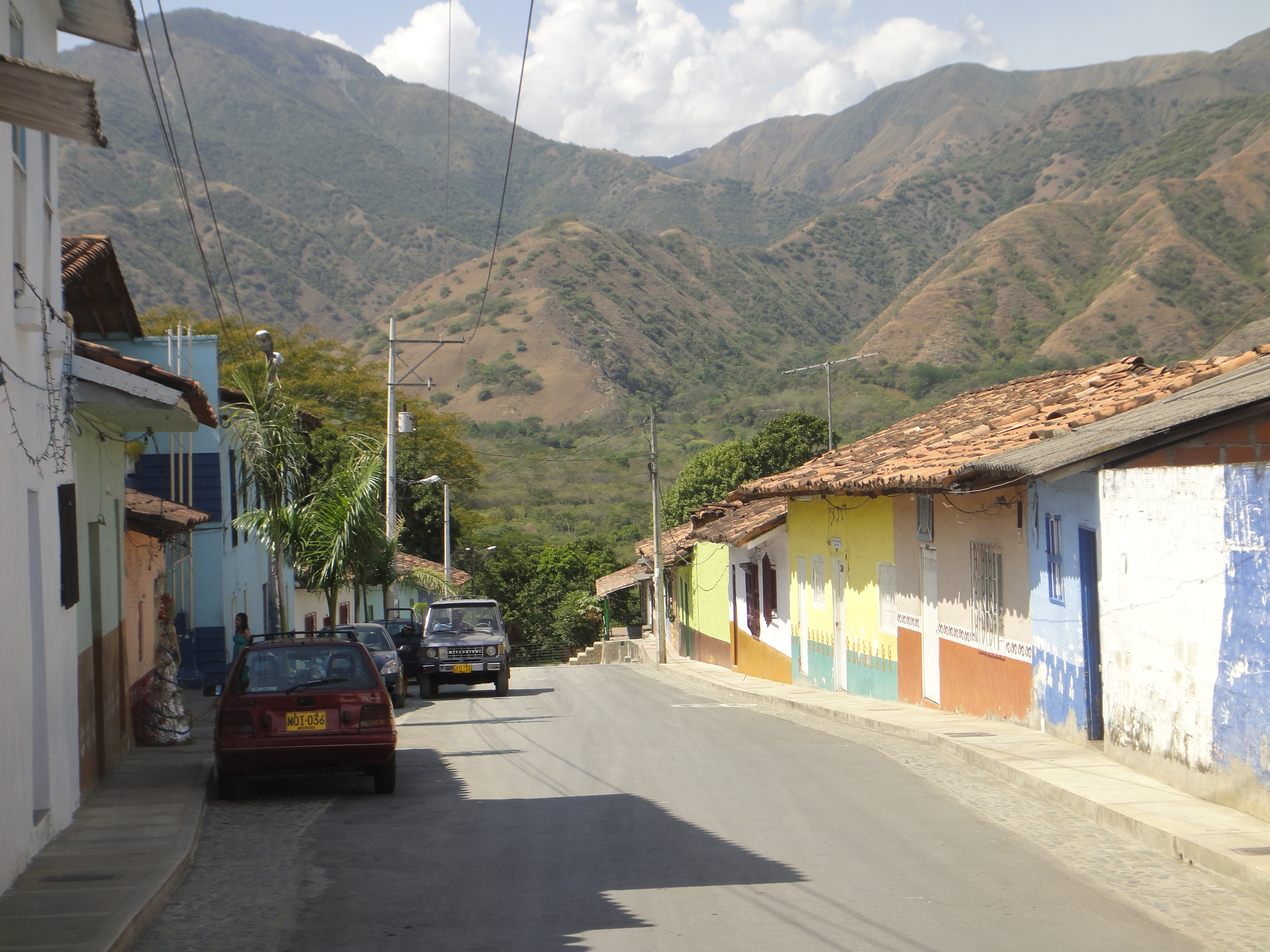

- Flag

- Location of the municipality and town of Olaya, Antioquia in the Antioquia Department of Colombia

- Location in Colombia
- Coordinates: 6°37′40″N 75°48′43″W
- Country: Colombia
- Department: Antioquia Department
- Subregion: Western
- Elevation: 500 m (1,600 ft)
- Time zone: UTC-5 (Colombia Standard Time)

Olaya is a town and municipality located in the western region of the Department of Antioquia in the Republic of Colombia. It borders to the north with the municipality of Liborina, to the east with the municipalities of Belmira and Sopetrán and to the South with Sopetrán and by the West with the municipality of Santa Fe de Antioquia. It lies at an altitude of 500 m (1,600 ft) above sea level.

Olaya is 100 kilometers away from the city of Medellín, capital of the Department of Antioquia. It has an area of 90 km^{2}, and is the smallest municipality in the department. Olaya is also one of the oldest municipalities of Antioquia.
