= El Peñón de Guatapé =

Rock in Colombia

Peñón de Guatapé
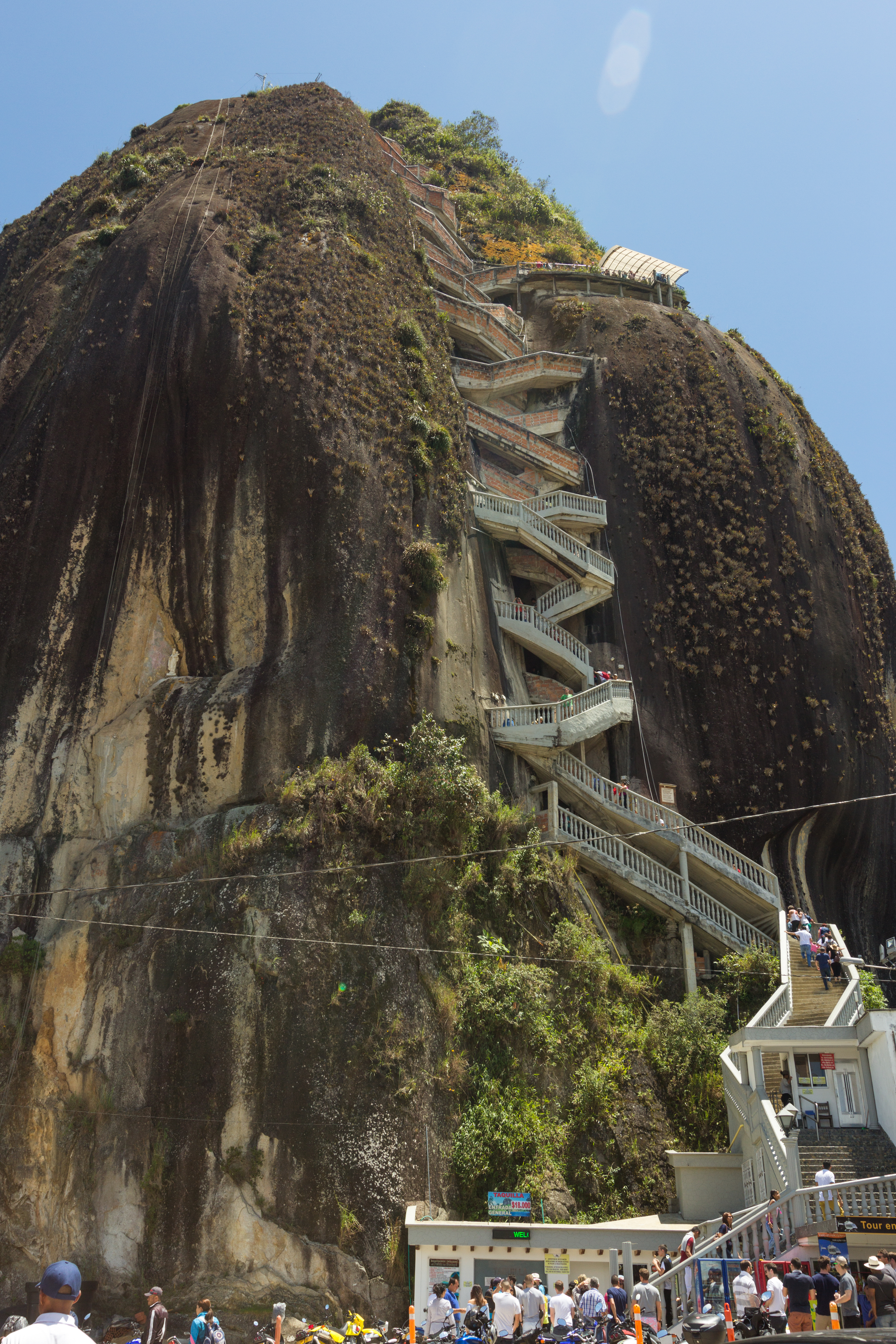
- The Rock of Guatapé.

Highest point
- Elevation: 2,137 m (7,011 ft)
- Coordinates: 6°13′10″N 75°10′45″W

Geography
- Location within Colombia
- Country: Colombia
- State: Antioquia
- Parent range: Central Ranges, Andes

Geology
- Mountain type: Granite dome

Climbing
- First ascent: Prehistoric

Interactive map of El Peñón de Guatapé

The Rock of Guatapé (Spanish: Peñón de Guatapé) (Tahamí language: Mojarrá) is a landmark inselberg in Colombia. It is located in the town and municipality of Guatapé, Antioquia. It is also known as The Stone of El Peñol, or simply La Piedra or El Peñol (La Piedra de El Peñol), as the town of El Peñol, which borders Guatapé, has also historically claimed the rock as their own and thus has led to different names for the site.

The landform is a granitic rock remnant that has resisted weathering and erosion, likely due to being less fractured than the surrounding bedrock. The Peñón de Guatapé is an outcrop of the Antioquia Batholith and towers up to 200 m (660 ft) above its base. Visitors can scale the rock via a staircase with 708 steps built into one side (an entrance fee is due).

Near the base of the rock are food and market stalls for shopping. The area around the rock contains many photo opportunities for visitors. Colorful murals of the rock painted by local artists decorate the insides of the restaurants and stores. A VIP area includes signs where tourists can take pictures with the name of the town and the rock behind it. A bronze statue of Luis Eduardo Villegas López sits at the bottom of the rock. The statue, installed on February 25, 2008, was created by sculptor Mario Hernández C. to honor Villegas as the first to climb to the top of the rock. About halfway up the stairs is a shrine to the Virgin Mary. The summit contains a three-story viewpoint tower, a convenience store, and a seating area. The top of the rock is surrounded by a railing that contains zócalos. Right outside of La Piedra, visitors can book helicopter tours that fly around the rock.

== History ==
According to geologists, the rock is approximately 65 million years old. The indigenous Tahamí, former inhabitants of this region, worshiped the rock and called it in their language mojarrá or mujará (meaning 'rock' or 'stone').

The rock was first officially climbed on July 16, 1954, when Luis Eduardo Villegas López, Pedro Nel Ramírez, and Ramón Díaz climbed it in a five-day endeavor, using sticks that were fixed against the rock's wall. Villegas purchased the rock from local farmers who saw the land as useless for farming. He built stairs into a crack in the rock and began to charge people to climb them. He is known as the owner of La Piedra, and the Villegas family continues to earn money because of his actions.

A viewing spot was built on top of the rock, where it is possible to acquire handicrafts and other local goods. Vendors sell fresh fruit and beverages. From the summit, one can see the 500 km shore-perimeter dam. There are 708 steps to the top of the building at the summit, a fact indicated by yellow numbers in the climb up the stairs.

In the 1940s, the Colombian government declared the rock a National Monument.

=== Graffiti ===
On the western face of the stone are painted a large white "G" and an incomplete "U" (only the single vertical stroke was completed, resembling an "I"). The towns of Guatapé and El Peñol had long disputed ownership of the rock, and the residents of Guatapé decided to settle the matter by painting the town's name on it in large white letters. It did not take long for the residents of El Peñol to notice the work, and a mob gathered to stop it, leaving behind the unfinished graffiti.

The entrance to La Plazoleta features a mural of La Piedra floating and a spaceman with the words, "¡Nos están dejando!". Locals once believed that the rock came from aliens.

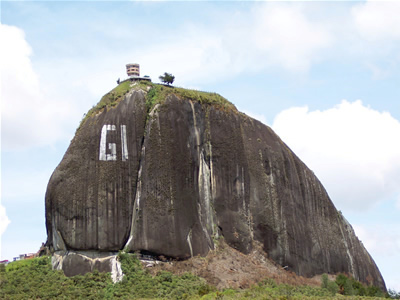
Side with graffiti

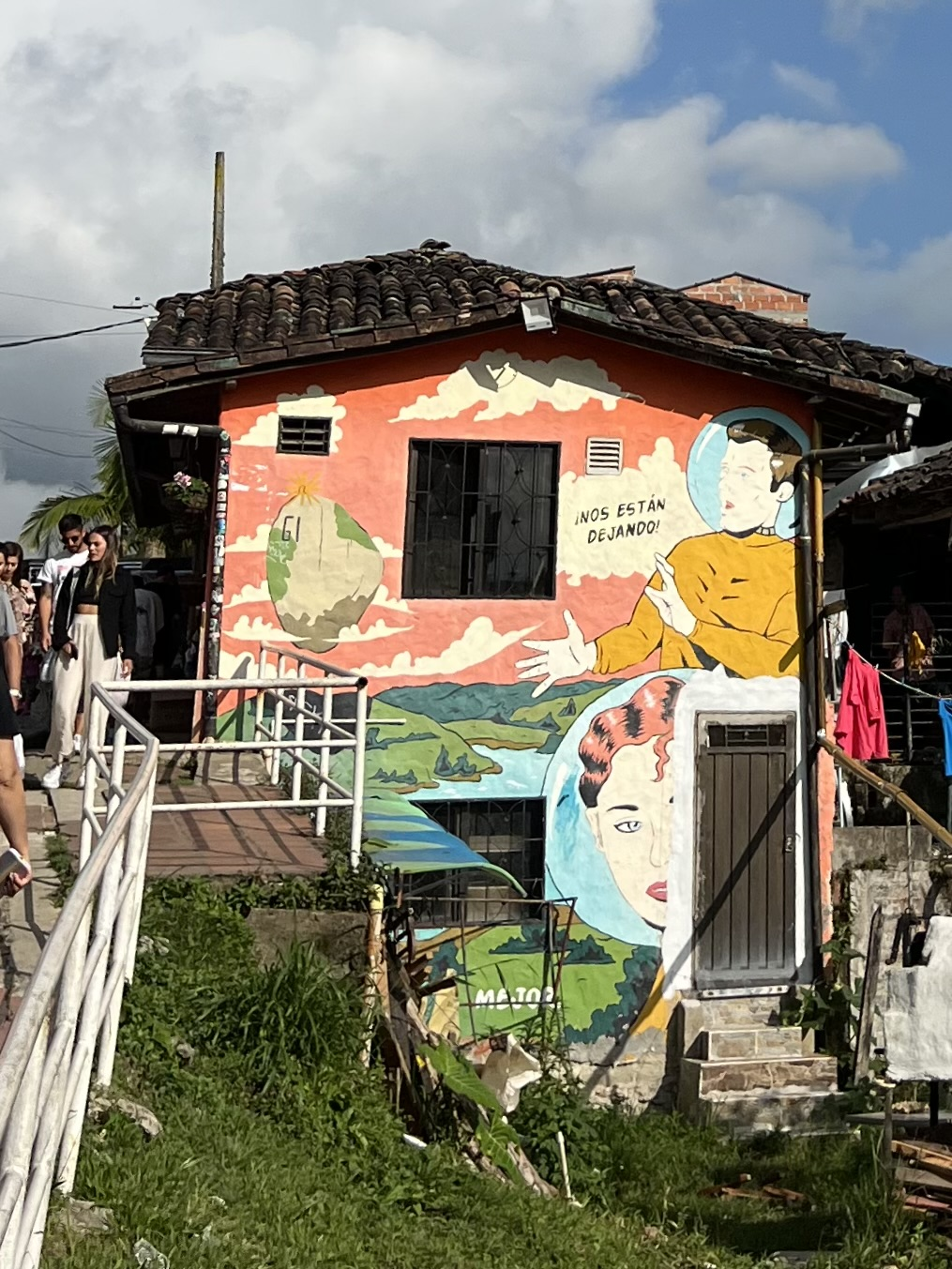
A mural in La Plazoleta that tells a story once believed by locals about where La Piedra came from.

== Properties ==
The rock rises from the bottom of the hydroelectric dam of Peñon de Guatapé. The monolith was spotted as a border landmark between country farms and the two cities.

At its highest part, on the rear (southeast side), the rock has an elevation of 2,135 metres (7,005 ft) above sea level, with an average temperature of 18 °C (64 °F). The "Peñol" is 285 metres (935 ft) long and 110 metres (360 ft) wide. It has some breaks, one of which was used to construct the 740 steps to the summit.

The Stone of Peñol is composed of quartz, feldspar and granite.

== The Amazing Race ==
On March 27, 2024, El Peñón de Guatapé was featured in an episode of the reality television series The Amazing Race that took place in and around the town of Guatapé. Contestants were seen racing up the stairs in order to find a clue hidden on top of the rock.

== Gallery ==
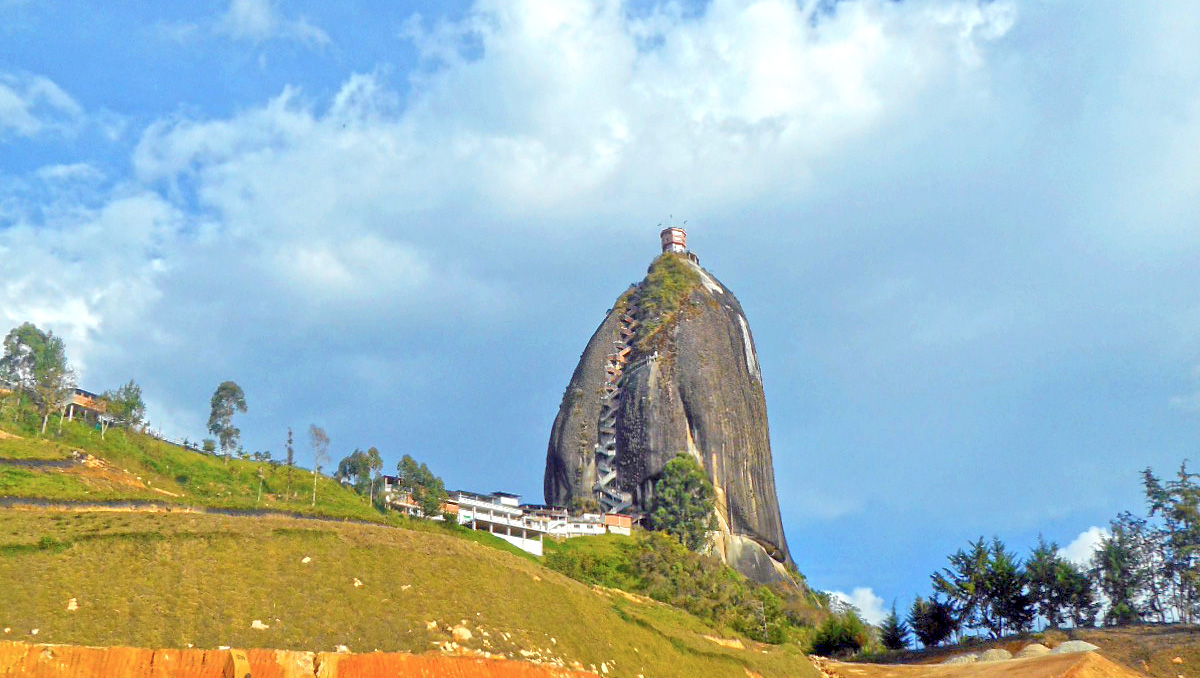
View of Peñón de Guatapé from the road

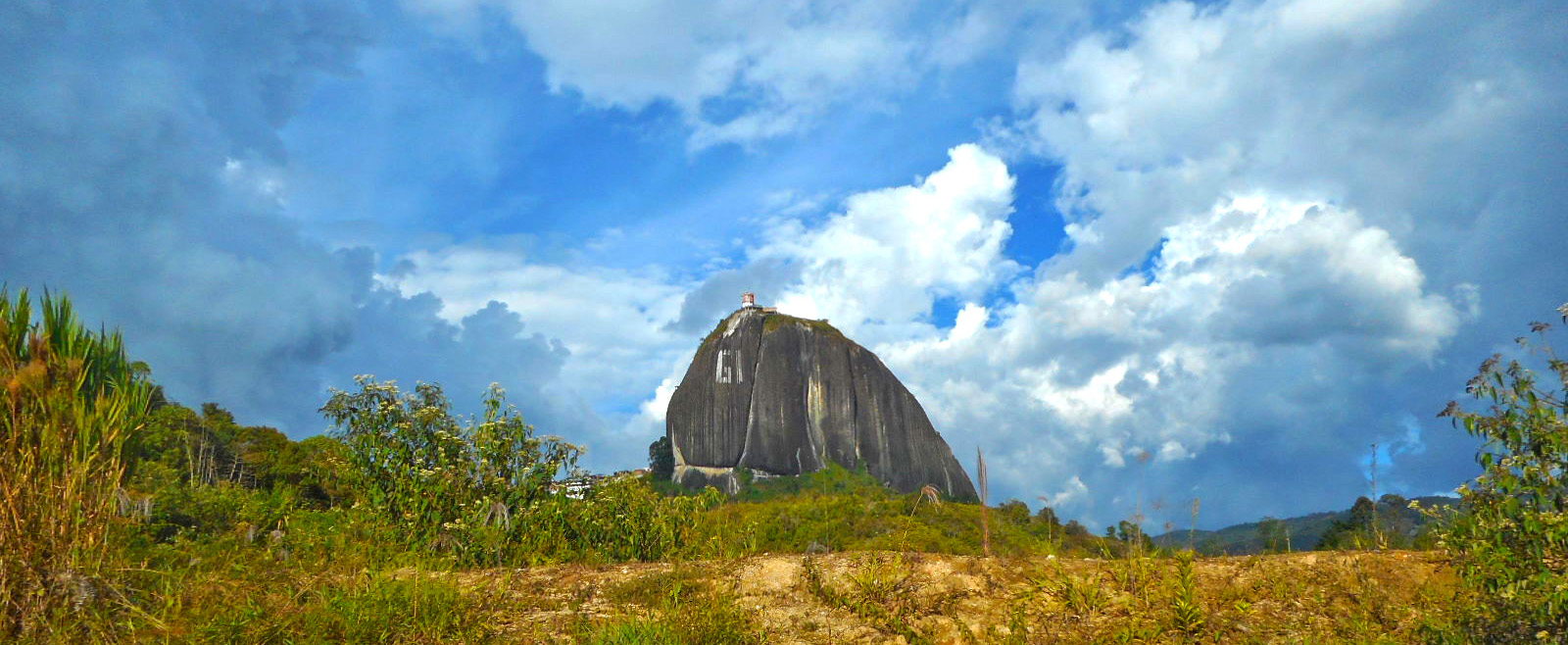
Peñón de Guatapé rising from the countryside

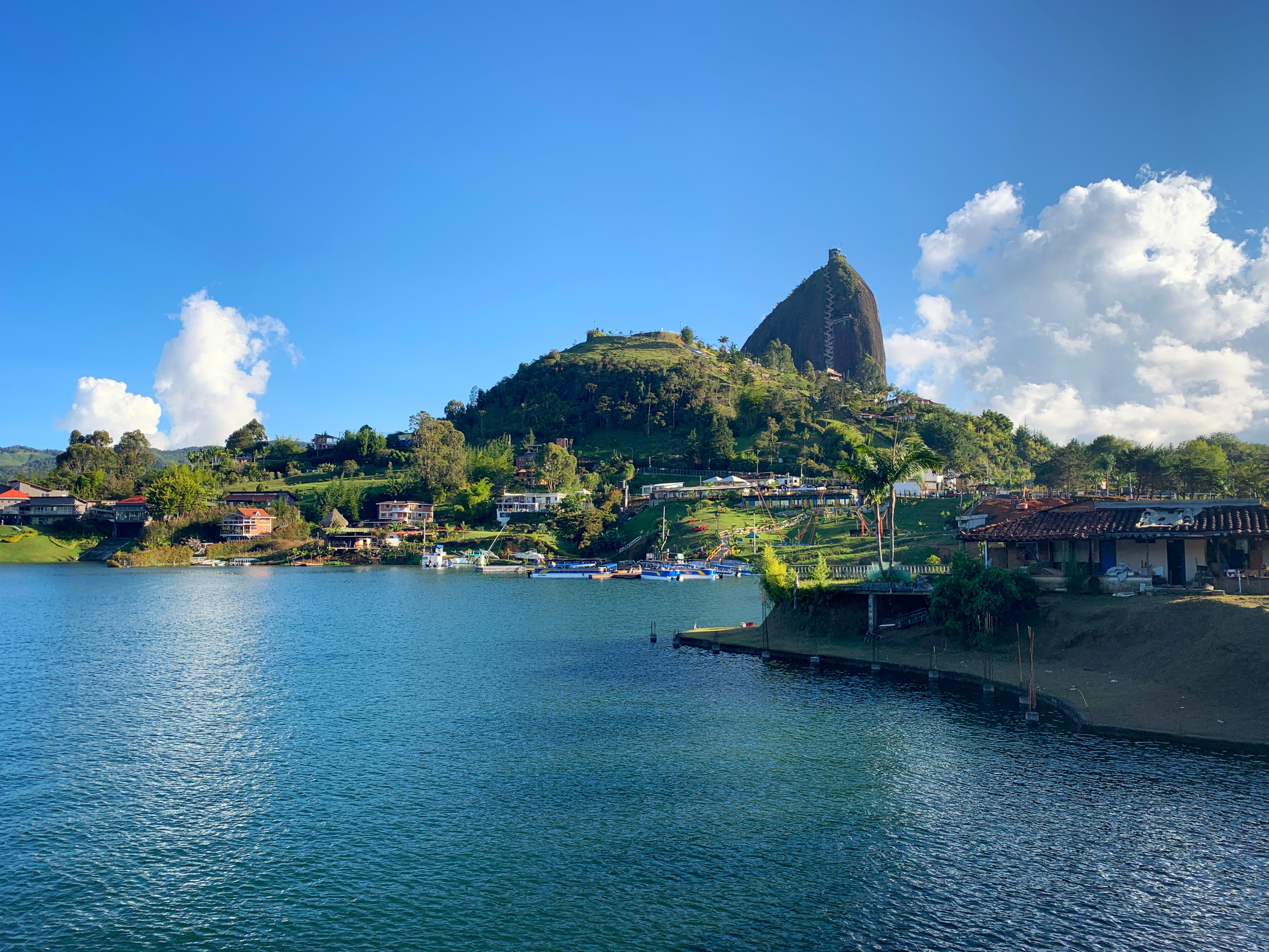
View of El Peñón de Guatapé from highway bridge

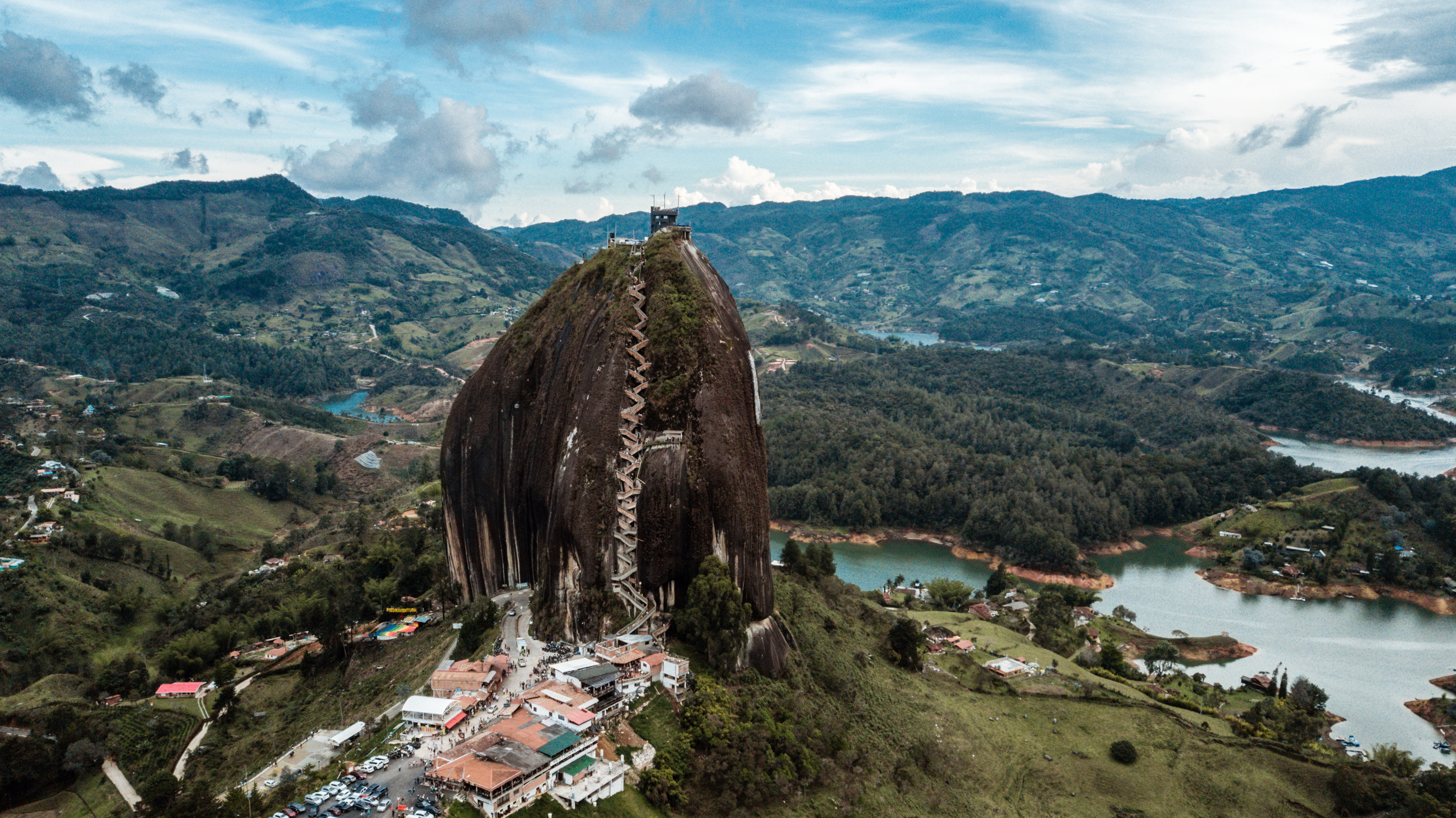
Aerial view

== See also ==
- Sugarloaf Mountain
- Penyal d'Ifac Natural Park
- List of inselbergs
