= Frontino, Antioquia =

- Municipality and town
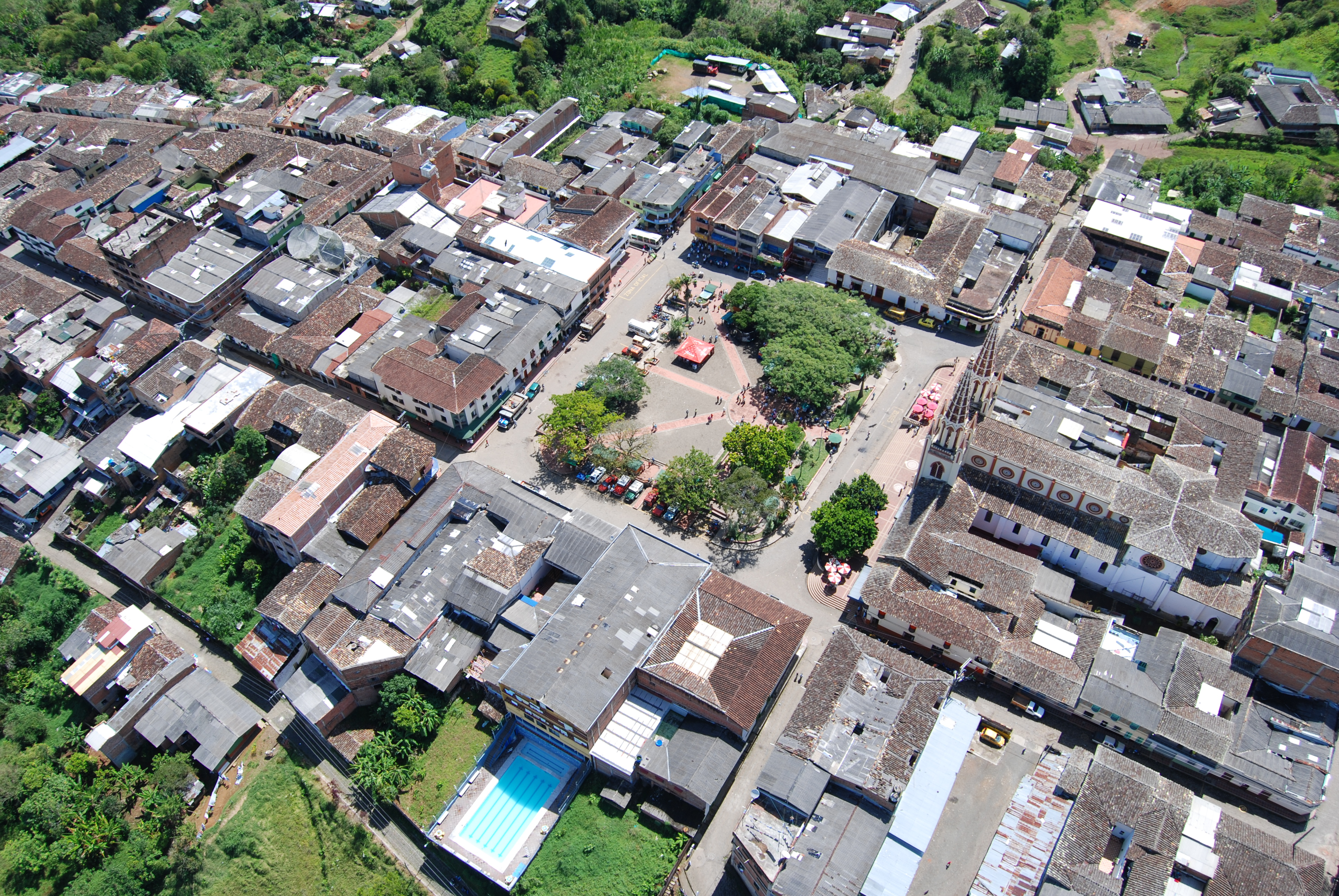
- View of Frontino

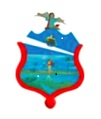
- Flag Coat of arms

- Location of the municipality and town of Frontino, Antioquia in the Antioquia Department of Colombia

- Location in Colombia
- Coordinates: 6°46′43″N 76°7′53″W
- Country: Colombia
- Department: Antioquia Department
- Subregion: Western

Area
  - Total: 1,263 km^{2} (488 sq mi)

Population (Census 2018)
  - Total: 20,156
  - Density: 15.96/km^{2} (41.33/sq mi)
- Time zone: UTC-5 (Colombia Standard Time)

Frontino is a municipality in the Colombian department of Antioquia. The population was 20,156 at the 2018 census.

== Climate ==
Climate data for Frontino (Musinga), elevation 1,330 m (4,360 ft), (1981–2010)
| Month | Jan | Feb | Mar | Apr | May | Jun | Jul | Aug | Sep | Oct | Nov | Dec | Year |
|---|---|---|---|---|---|---|---|---|---|---|---|---|---|
| Mean daily maximum °C (°F) | 25.4 (77.7) | 25.8 (78.4) | 25.9 (78.6) | 25.5 (77.9) | 25.3 (77.5) | 25.2 (77.4) | 25.3 (77.5) | 25.4 (77.7) | 25.1 (77.2) | 24.9 (76.8) | 24.7 (76.5) | 24.8 (76.6) | 25.3 (77.5) |
| Daily mean °C (°F) | 19.9 (67.8) | 20.0 (68.0) | 20.2 (68.4) | 20.1 (68.2) | 20.0 (68.0) | 19.9 (67.8) | 19.9 (67.8) | 20.0 (68.0) | 19.9 (67.8) | 19.8 (67.6) | 19.8 (67.6) | 19.8 (67.6) | 19.9 (67.8) |
| Mean daily minimum °C (°F) | 15.2 (59.4) | 15.1 (59.2) | 15.5 (59.9) | 15.9 (60.6) | 15.9 (60.6) | 15.8 (60.4) | 15.6 (60.1) | 15.7 (60.3) | 15.7 (60.3) | 15.6 (60.1) | 15.7 (60.3) | 15.5 (59.9) | 15.6 (60.1) |
| Average precipitation mm (inches) | 72.3 (2.85) | 88.0 (3.46) | 107.1 (4.22) | 211.6 (8.33) | 301.6 (11.87) | 274.5 (10.81) | 215.5 (8.48) | 211.9 (8.34) | 224.9 (8.85) | 243.0 (9.57) | 223.8 (8.81) | 128.4 (5.06) | 2,302.4 (90.65) |
| Average precipitation days (≥ 1.0 mm) | 12 | 12 | 15 | 22 | 25 | 23 | 22 | 22 | 23 | 25 | 24 | 19 | 244 |
| Average relative humidity (%) | 86 | 86 | 86 | 87 | 88 | 88 | 87 | 88 | 88 | 87 | 88 | 87 | 87 |
| Mean monthly sunshine hours | 158.1 | 146.8 | 127.1 | 99.0 | 102.3 | 120.0 | 139.5 | 133.3 | 108.0 | 114.7 | 123.0 | 145.7 | 1,517.5 |
| Mean daily sunshine hours | 5.1 | 5.2 | 4.1 | 3.3 | 3.3 | 4.0 | 4.5 | 4.3 | 3.6 | 3.7 | 4.1 | 4.7 | 4.2 |
Source: Instituto de Hidrologia Meteorologia y Estudios Ambientales
