= El Peñol, Antioquia =

El Peñol
- Municipality and town
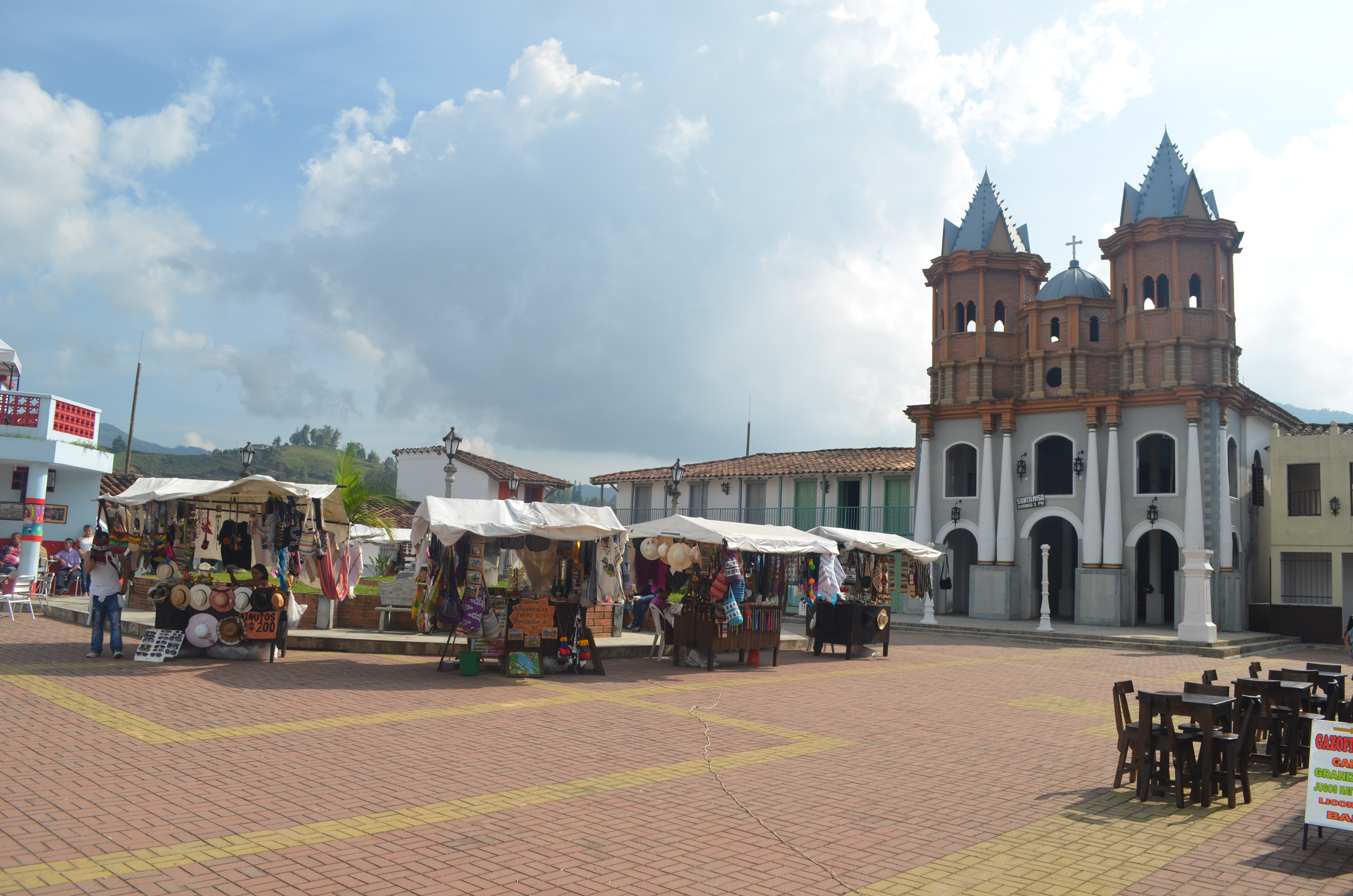

- Flag Coat of arms

- Location of the municipality and town of Peñol in the Antioquia Department of Colombia
- Coordinates: 6°13′7″N 75°14′36″W
- Country: Colombia
- Department: Antioquia Department

Area
  - Total: 125 km^{2} (48 sq mi)

Population (Census 2018)
  - Total: 16,223
  - Density: 130/km^{2} (336/sq mi)
- Time zone: UTC-5 (Colombia Standard Time)

El Peñol is a town and municipality in Antioquia Department, Colombia. The population was 16,223 at the 2018 census. It is part of the subregion of Eastern Antioquia. The town is nationally known for the nearby monolith known also as El Peñol, which is a tourist attraction.

== History ==
The town was originally founded along the Negro-Nare River in 1714 by Fray Miguel de Castro y Rivadeneiro. The area was inhabited by the indigenous Tahamí people prior to the Spanish arrival and colonization of the area.

In 1971, Empresas Públicas de Medellín determined that more water and power was needed to support the rapidly growing city of Medellín, located approximately 50 mi/30 km to the west, and decided that the Negro-Nare River should be dammed at Guatape, flooding the Negro-Nare River valley in which El Peñol was located. The old town seized by eminent domain and a new town was built several miles west, disrupting the lives of several thousand residents who were then forced to move to the new town without recourse.

The new dam was completed and the valley flooded in 1978. The El Peñol-Guatapé Reservoir now sits over the former location of El Peñol. A cross now marks the location in the reservoir above the former parish of El Viejo Peñol that fronted the town plaza. Some rural parts of Guatape were also flooded and lost.

== Climate ==
El Peñol has a subtropical highland climate (Köppen: Cfb) consistently warm temperatures and abundant rainfall.

Climate data for El Peñol (Penol), elevation 1,956 m (6,417 ft), (1981–2010)
Month	Jan	Feb	Mar	Apr	May	Jun	Jul	Aug	Sep	Oct	Nov	Dec	Year
Mean daily maximum °C (°F)	22.6 (72.7)	22.8 (73.0)	23.2 (73.8)	23.3 (73.9)	23.7 (74.7)	23.8 (74.8)	23.9 (75.0)	24.0 (75.2)	23.6 (74.5)	23.0 (73.4)	22.6 (72.7)	22.5 (72.5)	23.3 (73.9)
Daily mean °C (°F)	17.8 (64.0)	18.0 (64.4)	18.1 (64.6)	18.3 (64.9)	18.6 (65.5)	18.8 (65.8)	18.7 (65.7)	18.7 (65.7)	18.3 (64.9)	18.0 (64.4)	17.8 (64.0)	17.7 (63.9)	18.2 (64.8)
Mean daily minimum °C (°F)	12.8 (55.0)	13.0 (55.4)	13.0 (55.4)	13.1 (55.6)	13.3 (55.9)	13.0 (55.4)	12.7 (54.9)	12.8 (55.0)	12.6 (54.7)	12.6 (54.7)	12.7 (54.9)	12.7 (54.9)	12.9 (55.2)
Average precipitation mm (inches)	113.2 (4.46)	112.0 (4.41)	181.0 (7.13)	270.2 (10.64)	296.6 (11.68)	201.4 (7.93)	207.7 (8.18)	236.8 (9.32)	295.5 (11.63)	317.6 (12.50)	220.4 (8.68)	153.2 (6.03)	2,605.6 (102.58)
Average precipitation days (≥ 1.0 mm)	15	15	20	24	23	19	19	20	24	25	23	19	238
Average relative humidity (%)	86	86	86	87	86	83	82	83	85	86	87	87	86
Source: Instituto de Hidrologia Meteorologia y Estudios Ambientales

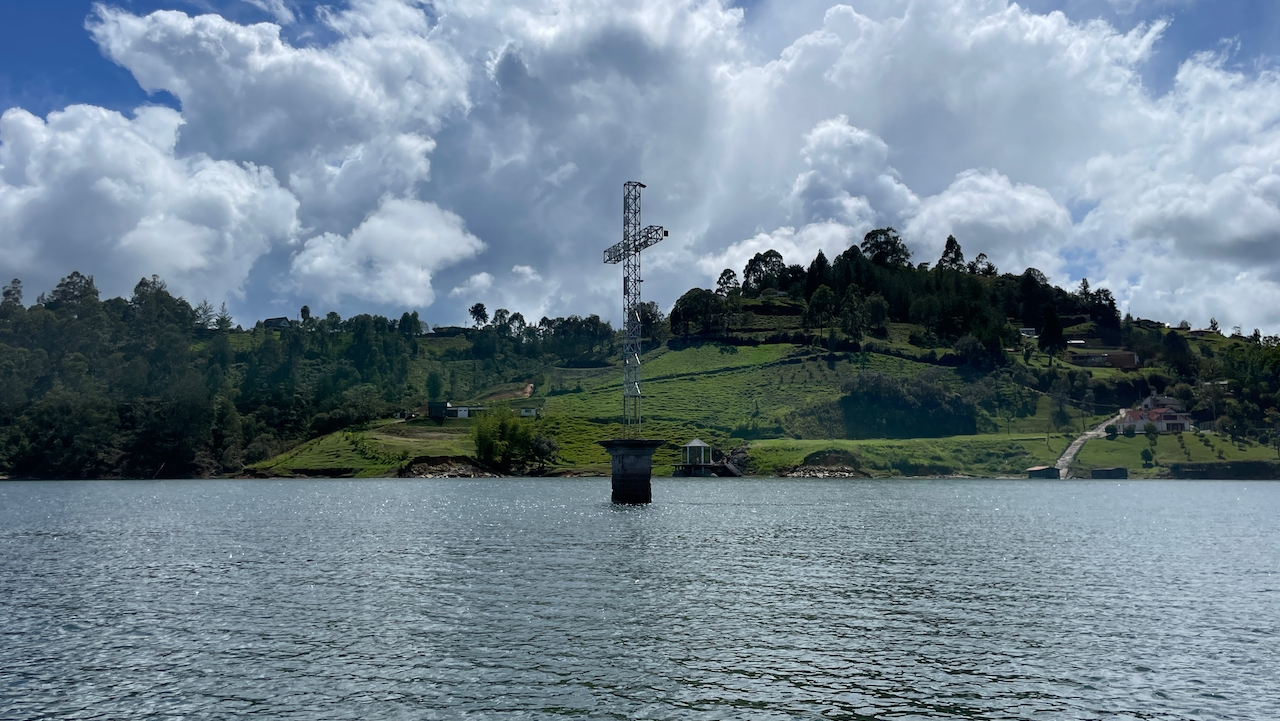
The former location of El Peñol

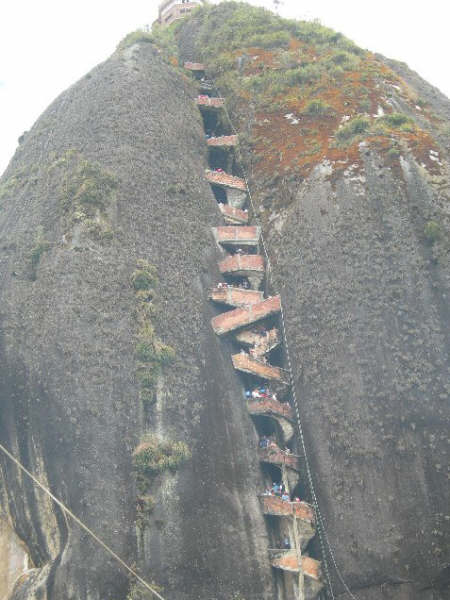
El Peñol rock, next to Guatapé dam
