= Western Antioquia =

Location of the Western Antioquia region within the Antioquia Department.

Western Antioquia is a subregion in the Colombian Department of Antioquia. The region is made up by 18 municipalities.

== Municipalities ==
- Abriaquí
- Antioquia
- Anza
- Armenia
- Buritica
- Cañasgordas
- Dabeiba
- Ebejico
- Frontino
- Giraldo
- Heliconia
- Liborina
- Olaya
- Peque
- Sabanalarga
- San Jerónimo
- Sopetrán
- Uramita
