= Sabanalarga, Antioquia =

- Municipality and town
- Flag Coat of arms

- Location of the municipality and town of Sabanalarga, Antioquia in the Antioquia Department of Colombia

- Location in Colombia
- Coordinates: 6°51′10.8″N 75°49′15.6″W
- Country: Colombia
- Department: Antioquia Department
- Subregion: Western
- Time zone: UTC-5 (Colombia Standard Time)

Sabanalarga (Spanish pronunciation: [saβanaˈlaɾɣa]) is a town and municipality in Antioquia Department, Colombia.
