= Ebéjico =

Ebéjico Ebexico
- Municipality and town
- Flag Coat of arms
- Nickname: Elbexo
- Location of the municipality and town of Ebéjico in the Antioquia Department of Colombia

- Location in Colombia
- Coordinates: 6°20′0″N 75°46′0″W
- Country: Colombia
- Department: Antioquia Department
- Subregion: Western

Area
  - Total: 235 km^{2} (91 sq mi)
- Elevation: 1,150 m (3,770 ft)

Population (Census 2018)
  - Total: 10,338
  - Density: 44.0/km^{2} (114/sq mi)
- Time zone: UTC-5 (Colombia Standard Time)

Ebéjico (Spanish pronunciation: [eˈβexiko]) is a town and municipality in the West of Antioquia Department, Colombia. The population was 10,338 at the 2018 census.

== Limits ==
Ebéjico is bounded on the north by the municipality towns of Santa Fe de Antioquia, Sopetrán and St. Jerome, on the east by the towns of San Jerónimo and the Antioquia Departmental capital city, Medellín, on the south by the municipalities of Heliconia and Armenia and to the west by the municipality of Anza. It is 42 kilometers from Medellín. Its area is 235 square kilometers.

== History ==
Before the arrival of the Spaniards, the land Valley of the Township Ebéjico was inhabited by aboriginal tribes Ebexicos and Peques both of the Nutabes tribe family. In 1595, Don Gaspar de Rodas, having defeated the natives, proceeded to Ebéjico to allot land to the victors, and to entrust the native people to captain Manuel López Bravo. Already in 1830, the village had the original name of "Community." In 1833, by order of Governor Juan de Dios Aranzazu, the parish of Ebéjico was created and so called for the indomitable tribe of the same name. Governor Aranzazu erected in the municipal district the Valley of Miraflores Community and appointed it as the seat of the new town (now Ebéjico).
