= Nutabe =

Total population
- 187 (2019)

Regions with significant populations
- Colombia

Languages
- Nutabe (formerly)

Religion
- Traditional

Related ethnic groups
- Tunebo

The Nutabe (or "Nutabae") are an indigenous people who inhabit the department of Antioquia in Colombia. Their numbers began to plummet around the first half of the 16th century due to the European colonization of the Americas. Spanish records indicate that this tribe lived in and around the Aburrá Valley, near present-day municipalities like Itagüí, Envigado and Sabaneta, and the towns of Toledo, San Andrés de Cuerquia and Ituango. In 1998, the Nutabe cacique Virgilio Sucerquia Chancí was assassinated by paramilitaries in a crime against humanity in order to take control of the ancestral territory and carry out the construction of the Ituango dam, the largest electrical project in the country.

== History ==
According to some historians and researchers Nutabes fall within the language family Chibchas. Nutabes were essentially farmers, especially maize and beans, fruit trees and even cotton. Also, in other economic fields, were fishermen and also miners mined alluvial gold field and the Medellin river.

== Sociopolitical organization ==
Their society was organized into small chiefdoms hereditary, individually scattered and lacking any central power. However, compared to the Spanish conquest (and against other situations overall incidence), these tribes used to join in a federated so to call it around the chief who had shown more courage in any of their tasks warriors. The Nutabes despite belonging to a group of peaceful tribes of the area were recognized Antioquia also as warriors typically when protecting their territory. When the Spanish arrived, the leadership of the tribe was exercised by a chief named Guarcama.

== Economy ==
The Nutabes traded with neighboring tribes, for which they used a strategic bridge over the river San Andreas, at its mouth, bridging indigenous language he called Bredunto. This name became Pescadero after the Spanish conquest. This bridge was important for life Nutabe. Amid the bustle conqueror, indigenous him down. Somewhat later, Andres de Valdivia, of the conquering, given its importance rebuilt it.

== See also ==
- Antioquia department
- Aburrá Valley
- Chibchas
