= Tahamí people =

Extinct Indigenous people of Colombia

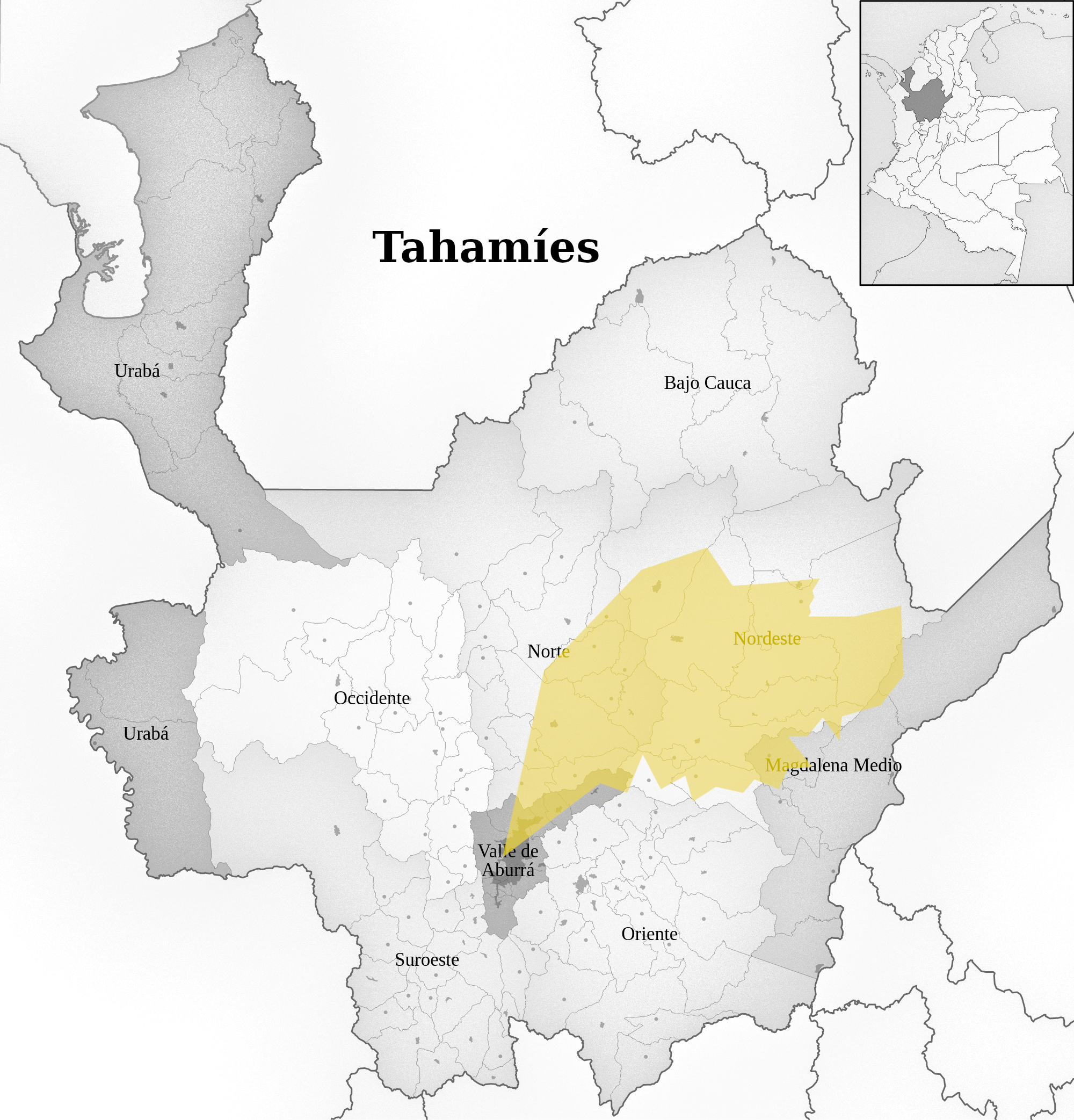
Area of influence overlaid on the Antioquia Department

The Tahamí were a Colombian Indigenous people who inhabited the Antioquia Department region west of the Magdalena River at the time of the Spanish conquest of New Granada; the Nutabe were their northern neighbor and Muisca their southeastern. Their name comes from the Choco languages, meaning 'those who live farther out'. They were defined as comparably advanced to the Muisca in Century Dictionary and did not have hereditary rulers. It was customary the dead be buried with gold.

== See also ==
- Tahamí terrane
