= Santa Fe de Antioquia =

- Municipality and town
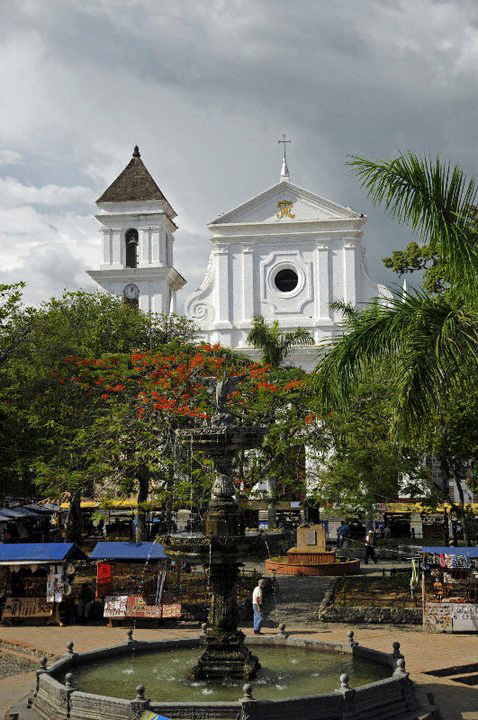

- Flag Coat of arms

- Location of the municipality and town of Santa Fe de Antioquia in the Antioquia Department of Colombia

- Location in Colombia
- Coordinates: 6°33′N 75°49′W
- Country: Colombia
- Department: Antioquia Department
- Subregion: Western

Area
  - Total: 493 km^{2} (190 sq mi)

Population (Census 2018)
  - Total: 23,216
  - Density: 47.1/km^{2} (122/sq mi)
- Time zone: UTC-5 (Colombia Standard Time)

Santa Fe de Antioquia is a municipality in the Antioquia Department, Colombia. The city is located approximately 58 kilometres (36 mi) north of Medellín, the department capital. The population was 23,216 at the 2018 census.

== History ==
Founded in 1541 by Jorge Robledo as Villa de Santafé on the western bank of the Cauca River, in 1545 it received the coat of arms and the title of City of Antioquia from King Philip II of Spain. It was elevated to the status of parish in 1547 by the bishop of Popayán. It changed its name in 1584 when it became the capital of Antioquia. It was a mining town from its beginnings and the gold mining operation has been the base of its economy.

Its cathedral was constructed in 1799 and elevated to the Diocese of Antioquia in 1804 by Pope Pius VII. In 1813 Antioquia was declared a sovereign and independent state with Santa Fe as its capital, a status it maintained until 1826, when Medellín was chosen as the new departmental seat. Due to the state of conservation of its colonial architecture, it was declared a national monument in 1960.

== Geography ==
The municipal area is 493 square kilometres (190 sq mi), with a mountainous territory within the Central Cordillera of the Andes and watered by both the Cauca and the Tonusco Rivers.

=== Climate ===
The climate of Santa Fe de Antioquia is tropical and humid, typical of Colombia's Cauca River valley, due to its low altitude and its geographical location near the equator. The average temperature is 25.5 °C (77.9 °F) throughout the year. This pleasant weather has allowed tourism to develop in the city, which has been filled with hostels, hotels and water parks frequented by people from Medellín and the near metropolitan area.

Climate data for Santa Fe de Antioquia (Cotove Hda), elevation 530 m (1,740 ft), (1981–2010)
| Month | Jan | Feb | Mar | Apr | May | Jun | Jul | Aug | Sep | Oct | Nov | Dec | Year |
|---|---|---|---|---|---|---|---|---|---|---|---|---|---|
| Mean daily maximum °C (°F) | 35.5 (95.9) | 36.0 (96.8) | 35.6 (96.1) | 34.9 (94.8) | 33.9 (93.0) | 33.6 (92.5) | 34.2 (93.6) | 34.8 (94.6) | 34.1 (93.4) | 33.5 (92.3) | 33.4 (92.1) | 34.1 (93.4) | 34.5 (94.1) |
| Daily mean °C (°F) | 27.9 (82.2) | 28.4 (83.1) | 28.4 (83.1) | 27.5 (81.5) | 26.7 (80.1) | 26.6 (79.9) | 26.8 (80.2) | 27.1 (80.8) | 26.4 (79.5) | 26.0 (78.8) | 26.3 (79.3) | 26.8 (80.2) | 27 (81) |
| Mean daily minimum °C (°F) | 20.1 (68.2) | 20.7 (69.3) | 20.8 (69.4) | 21.0 (69.8) | 20.8 (69.4) | 20.6 (69.1) | 20.4 (68.7) | 20.3 (68.5) | 20.2 (68.4) | 20.4 (68.7) | 20.2 (68.4) | 20.2 (68.4) | 20.4 (68.7) |
| Average precipitation mm (inches) | 18.8 (0.74) | 30.0 (1.18) | 46.5 (1.83) | 86.5 (3.41) | 143.0 (5.63) | 110.2 (4.34) | 101.8 (4.01) | 108.8 (4.28) | 144.2 (5.68) | 151.1 (5.95) | 87.6 (3.45) | 46.7 (1.84) | 1,075.2 (42.33) |
| Average precipitation days (≥ 1.0 mm) | 5 | 7 | 10 | 15 | 19 | 16 | 15 | 15 | 18 | 19 | 14 | 9 | 157 |
| Average relative humidity (%) | 68 | 66 | 68 | 74 | 78 | 79 | 77 | 75 | 77 | 80 | 79 | 75 | 75 |
| Mean monthly sunshine hours | 220.1 | 194.8 | 182.9 | 162.0 | 167.4 | 186.0 | 213.9 | 204.6 | 171.0 | 167.4 | 174.0 | 192.2 | 2,236.3 |
| Mean daily sunshine hours | 7.1 | 6.9 | 5.9 | 5.4 | 5.4 | 6.2 | 6.9 | 6.6 | 5.7 | 5.4 | 5.8 | 6.2 | 6.1 |
Source: Instituto de Hidrologia Meteorologia y Estudios Ambientales

== Economy ==
The economy of Santa Fe de Antioquia is based on agriculture: the main products are coffee, maize and beans.

== Tourism ==
Tourism has been, and continues to be one of the more important economic enterprises for the municipality. The opening of the Tunnel of the West (which reduces the time and the distance between the locality and Medellín) in 2006 has allowed hundreds of tourists to arrive each weekend, stimulating the vocation of the vicinity as a summer vacation site. In 2017 a modernization project began on its main Plaza which was completed in 2018. The project closed traffic to cars and added gardens with the help of Botanical Garden of Medellín.

Santa Fe was named a Pueblo Patrimonio (heritage town) of Colombia in 2010. It was the only municipality in Antioquia selected to be part of the Red Turística de Pueblos Patrimonio original cohort.

=== Sites of Interest ===
All of the town is a historical site; the architecture that has survived through the years gives Santa Fe de Antioquia the aspect of a city "suspended" in the colonial era, which is the reason the city was declared National monument.

- Puente de Occidente (Bridge of the West, a National Monument); suspension bridge built in 1887, same year as the Eiffel Tower, over the Cauca River.
- Metropolitan Cathedral
- Archiepiscopal Palace
- Plaza Mayor Juan de Corral
- Museum of Religious Art
- The House of the Two Palms
- La Playita (Famous Ranch To The South of the Plaza)
- Tonusco Campestre

== See also ==
- Antioquian languages
