= Cisneros, Antioquia =

Cisneros
- Municipality and Town
- Municipio de Cisneros
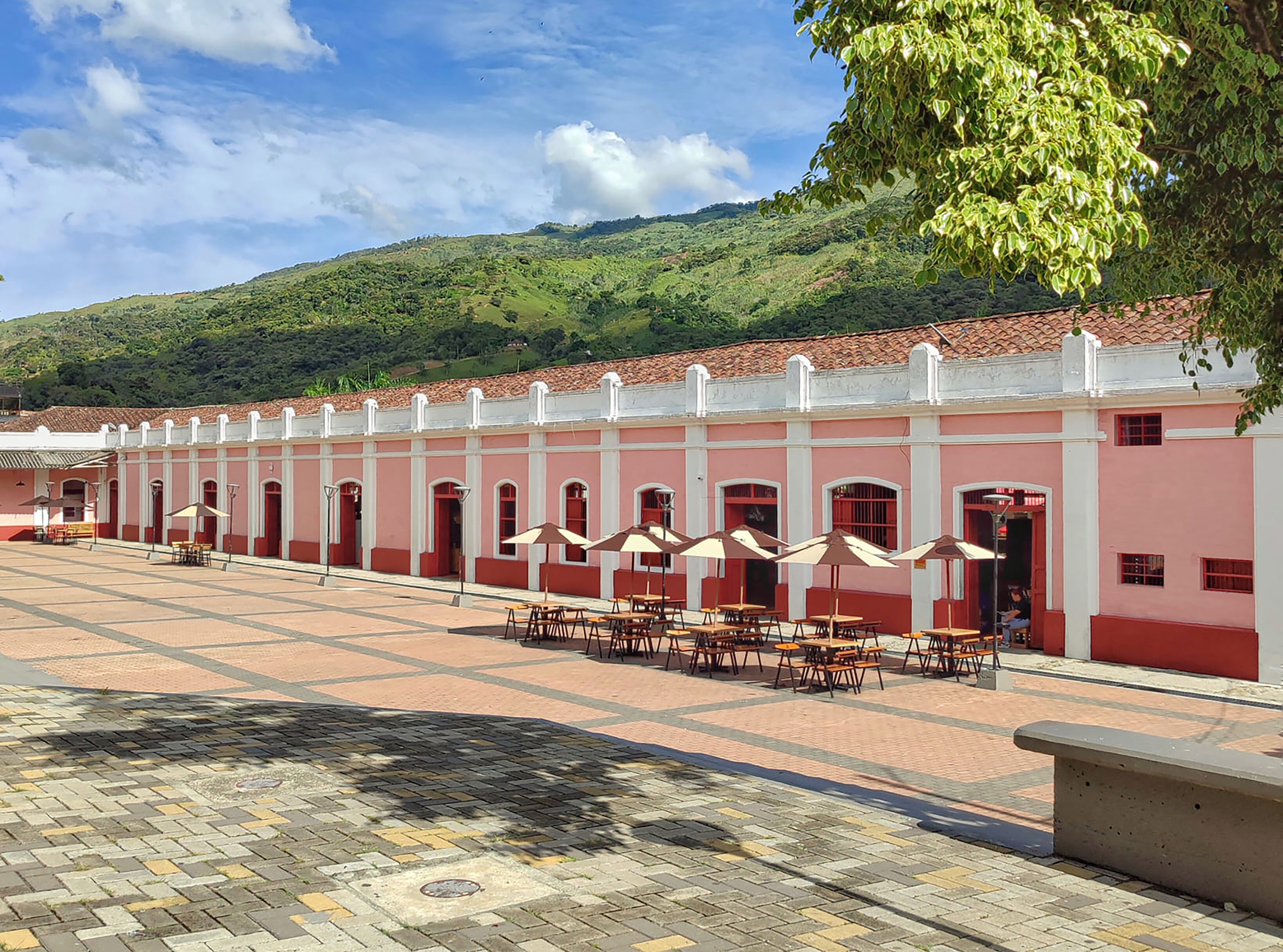

- Flag Coat of arms

- Location of the municipality and town of Cisneros, Antioquia in the Antioquia Department of Colombia

- Location in Colombia
- Coordinates: 6°32′18″N 75°05′19″W
- Country: Colombia
- Department: Antioquia Department
- Subregion: Northeastern
- Founded: February 3, 1910

Government
  - Type: Mayor–council
  - Body: Alcaldía de Cisneros
  - Mayor: Lina María Correa Valencia (2024-2027)

Area
  - Total: 46 km^{2} (18 sq mi)
- Elevation: 1,050 m (3,440 ft)

Population (2025)
  - Total: 10,495
  - Density: 230/km^{2} (590/sq mi)
- Time zone: UTC-5 (Colombia Standard Time)
- Area code: +57 604
- Website: cisneros-antioquia.gov.co/sitio.shtml (in Spanish)

Cisneros is a Municipality in Colombia, located in the Northeastern of the Antioquia Department. It borders the municipality of Yolombó to the north, the municipalities of Yolombó and Santo Domingo to the east, and Santo Domingo to the south. It is located at an altitude of 1,050 m (3,440 ft) above sea level.

== History ==
It was founded alongside the inauguration of the train service of the Antioquia Railway, on land that years earlier had been inhabited by the Tahamí indigenous people, who practiced agriculture, goldsmithing, and pottery. In 1898, it was decided that La Quiebra would bear the name “Cisneros,” the surname of the Cuban engineer Francisco Javier Cisneros, responsible for the construction of the Antioquia Railway. In 1923, the settlement acquired the status of municipality. At 2:00 p.m. on Thursday, February 3, 1910, with the attendance of the President of the Republic, General Ramón González Valencia; his Minister of Public Works, Dr. Carlos J. Delgado; General Pedro Nel Ospina; Dr. Carlos E. Restrepo; Nicolás Esguerra; Antonio José Uribe; Enrique W. Fernández; Carlos Cock, Manager of the Antioquia Railway; Dr. Jorge Páez G., Chief Engineer of the company; and distinguished personalities from Medellín, the Cisneros Station of the Antioquia Railway was solemnly inaugurated.

This, and no other, is the origin of the town, and this is also the exact date of its foundation. Cisneros is, therefore, the work of the Antioquia Railway. For many years, the Cisneros Station was the terminal of the Nús line of the Railroad, which was meant to connect Medellín with the Magdalena River.

And as this terminal station, with large warehouses for storing goods that awaited crossing the mountain range on muleback, began to gain great economic importance, the major industrialists and merchants of Medellín decided to establish their distribution facilities there, in order to supply trade throughout the region at better prices than those they had to set when transporting the merchandise to the capital and then sending it back to the towns.

And thus the new settlement grew significantly, eventually attracting the core group of merchants who established themselves there permanently.

Another factor that greatly contributed to the development of Cisneros was the long-standing inability of the Antioquia Railroad Company to undertake the valuable and admirable work of the La Quiebra Tunnel, which led merchants to provide good commercial premises and comfortable houses for their businesses and residences.

It bears its name in memory of the distinguished Cuban engineer Francisco Javier Cisneros, who dedicated much of his life to making the magnificent work of the Antioquia Railway a reality. Until 1923, Cisneros was a district of Santo Domingo, but the remarkable growth of the settlement, its unusual commercial activity, the drive of its people, its privileged location, and the civic spirit of its leaders prevailed before the Departmental Government, obtaining from the Assembly Ordinance No. 11, dated April 13, 1923, which created the municipality with autonomous status, separating it from Santo Domingo.

This Ordinance was signed by Dr. Jesús María Yépes as President of the Assembly and sanctioned by Dr. Ricardo Jiménez Jaramillo as Governor. On July 1 of the same year, the first municipal council was installed, composed of Santiago López, Isaías Cuartas, Rafael Castaño, Delfín Quintero, Juan de Dios Ceballos, and Luis Gómez. Like lightning, the progress of Cisneros took place—lightning that extended with the opening of the La Quiebra Tunnel, which dealt a severe blow to the town’s economy; yet, thanks to the steadfast vigor of its people, they managed to endure without being diminished.

When that temporary movement came to an end, the inhabitants of Cisneros were already prepared to continue their lives with another source of wealth: agriculture and their own industries, as well as commerce to supply many neighboring towns. Thus, after this brief collapse, the town once again set out on the path of definitive progress.

A chapel that had been used for worship in Cisneros was replaced, through the efforts of its inhabitants, by a modern temple. In a park stands a bronze bust of Dr. Tulio Vásquez, who more than anyone fought in Cisneros for material progress, while at the same time dedicating himself to safeguarding the health of all its inhabitants.

== Climate ==
Cisneros has a tropical rainforest climate (Af) with heavy rainfall year-round.

Climate data for Cisneros
Month	Jan	Feb	Mar	Apr	May	Jun	Jul	Aug	Sep	Oct	Nov	Dec	Year
Mean daily maximum °C (°F)	28.2 (82.8)	28.7 (83.7)	28.8 (83.8)	28.3 (82.9)	28.2 (82.8)	28.2 (82.8)	28.4 (83.1)	28.4 (83.1)	27.9 (82.2)	27.3 (81.1)	27.2 (81.0)	27.5 (81.5)	28.1 (82.6)
Daily mean °C (°F)	22.9 (73.2)	23.3 (73.9)	23.5 (74.3)	23.4 (74.1)	23.3 (73.9)	23.1 (73.6)	23.1 (73.6)	23.2 (73.8)	22.8 (73.0)	22.4 (72.3)	22.5 (72.5)	22.4 (72.3)	23.0 (73.4)
Mean daily minimum °C (°F)	17.7 (63.9)	17.9 (64.2)	18.3 (64.9)	18.6 (65.5)	18.5 (65.3)	18.1 (64.6)	17.9 (64.2)	18.0 (64.4)	17.8 (64.0)	17.6 (63.7)	17.8 (64.0)	17.3 (63.1)	18.0 (64.3)
Average rainfall mm (inches)	81 (3.2)	87 (3.4)	158 (6.2)	277 (10.9)	365 (14.4)	271 (10.7)	261 (10.3)	303 (11.9)	332 (13.1)	367 (14.4)	238 (9.4)	112 (4.4)	2,852 (112.3)
Source: Climate-Data.org
