= Hincapié =

Hincapié (anglicized as Hincapie) is a surname. Notable people with that name include:

- Cecilia Hincapié (born 1976), Colombian tennis player
- George Hincapie (born 1973), American cyclist
- Guillermo Hincapié Orozco (c. 1926 – 2018), Colombian civil engineer and politician
- María Teresa Hincapié (1956–2008), Colombian performance artist
- María Teresa Uribe de Hincapié (1940–2019), Colombian sociologist
- Marielena Hincapié (active from 2020), Colombian-American lawyer
- Piero Hincapié (born 2002), Ecuadorian footballer

== Other uses ==
- 25608 Hincapie, a minor planet, named after Melisa Hincapie (born 1991), Colombian engineer

== See also ==
- Hincapie–Leomo p/b BMC, a defunct American cycling team
