= Skot =

Skot may refer to:

- Skot (unit), a deprecated non-SI unit of luminance

SKOT may refer to:

- Otú Airport (ICAO airport code)
- OT-64 SKOT, a Polish-Czechoslovak APC
