= San Roque, Antioquia =

- Municipality and town
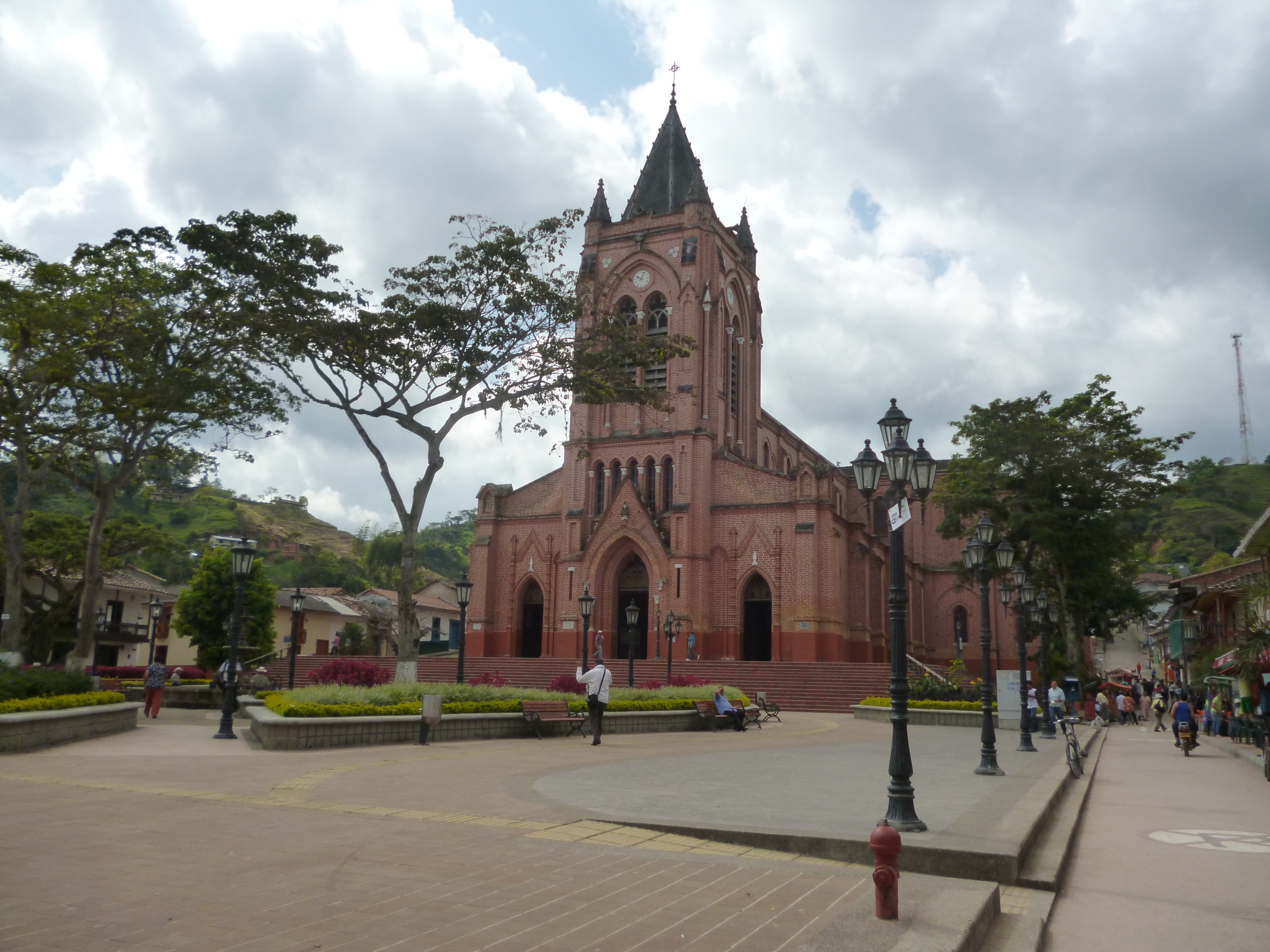

- Flag Seal

- Location of the municipality and town of San Roque in the Antioquia Department of Colombia

- Location in Colombia
- Coordinates: 6°29′7″N 75°1′11″W
- Country: Colombia
- Department: Antioquia Department
- Subregion: Northeastern
- Founded: 8 February 1880

Area
  - Municipality and town: 441 km^{2} (170 sq mi)
- Elevation: 1,475 m (4,839 ft)

Population (2015)
  - Municipality and town: 16,789
  - Density: 38.1/km^{2} (98.6/sq mi)
  - Urban: 6,298
  - Metro: 10,493
- Time zone: UTC-5 (Colombia Standard Time)

San Roque is a town and municipality in the Colombian department of Antioquia. Part of the subregion of Northeastern Antioquia, it is located 1,475 m (4,839 ft) above sea level. The municipality was founded by Francisco Martinez de Ospina on the 8 February 1880. The town is located between the Nare River and the Nus River. The town was created due to the presence of gold in the areas around the town. The town is located 121 km north of Medellín. The people of this town celebrate most of the traditional festivals that are celebrated in Colombia.

== History ==
San Roque became a municipality in the year 1884. In 1911 the Antioquia Railway is built, traveling near the town and bringing some economy to the area. San Roque was known as a mining center at this time. The past history is what attracts the modern day tourists, and San Roque is often called "The Land of Cordiality" because the natives are so friendly.

== Climate ==
San Roque has a tropical rainforest climate (Af). It has very heavy rainfall year-round.

Climate data for San Roque (Nus Gja Exp El), elevation 835 m (2,740 ft), (1981–2010)
Month	Jan	Feb	Mar	Apr	May	Jun	Jul	Aug	Sep	Oct	Nov	Dec	Year
Mean daily maximum °C (°F)	28.2 (82.8)	28.7 (83.7)	28.5 (83.3)	28.3 (82.9)	28.0 (82.4)	28.2 (82.8)	28.5 (83.3)	28.7 (83.7)	28.1 (82.6)	27.7 (81.9)	27.4 (81.3)	27.7 (81.9)	28.2 (82.8)
Daily mean °C (°F)	23.3 (73.9)	23.8 (74.8)	23.8 (74.8)	23.8 (74.8)	23.7 (74.7)	23.7 (74.7)	23.7 (74.7)	23.8 (74.8)	23.6 (74.5)	23.2 (73.8)	23.1 (73.6)	23.2 (73.8)	23.5 (74.3)
Mean daily minimum °C (°F)	17.8 (64.0)	18.1 (64.6)	18.5 (65.3)	18.9 (66.0)	19.1 (66.4)	19.0 (66.2)	18.4 (65.1)	18.5 (65.3)	18.8 (65.8)	18.9 (66.0)	19.0 (66.2)	18.9 (66.0)	18.7 (65.7)
Average precipitation mm (inches)	46.5 (1.83)	91.6 (3.61)	120.2 (4.73)	233.6 (9.20)	268.9 (10.59)	209.7 (8.26)	213.7 (8.41)	222.3 (8.75)	291.5 (11.48)	274.4 (10.80)	175.4 (6.91)	85.5 (3.37)	2,233.3 (87.93)
Average precipitation days (≥ 1.0 mm)	10	12	14	22	24	20	20	22	22	24	19	14	216
Average relative humidity (%)	82	80	81	84	85	83	81	80	83	85	86	85	83
Mean monthly sunshine hours	182.9	158.1	130.2	138.0	164.3	186.0	213.9	207.7	174.0	161.2	147.0	161.2	2,024.5
Mean daily sunshine hours	5.9	5.6	4.2	4.6	5.3	6.2	6.9	6.7	5.8	5.2	4.9	5.2	5.5
Source: Instituto de Hidrologia Meteorologia y Estudios Ambientales
