= Sofía Medina de López =

Colombian politician

Mayor of Medellín
- In office September 11, 1976 – July 15, 1977
- Preceded by: Victor Cárdenas Jaramillo
- Succeeded by: Guillermo Hincapié Orozco

Personal details
- Died: September 27, 2017 Bogotá, Colombia
- Party: Colombian Conservative Party

Sofía Medina de López Villa (died September 27, 2017) was a Colombian politician. She served as the Mayor of Medellín, the country's second largest city, from 1976 until 1977. Medina de López was Medellín's first female mayor and remains the only woman to hold the mayoral office in the city's history.

Medina de López was raised in the town of Yolombó in Northeastern Antioquia Department.

In September 1976, President Alfonso López Michelsen, a member of the Colombian Liberal Party, appointed Sofía Medina de López, a member of the Colombian Conservative Party, as the new mayor of Medellín. Despite their different political affiliations, President López Michelsen chose Medina de López because her Conservative Party dominated both the Antioquia Department's state government and the city of Medellín at the time.

Medina de López resigned from office in July 1977 due to a dispute with the national government. Antioquia Department Governor Jaime Sierra García appointed Guillermo Hincapié Orozco, who took office on July 15, 1977, as her successor.

Today, the Mayor of Medellín is a directly elected office. Sofía Medina de López remains Medellín's only female mayor to date.

Sofía Medina de López died in Bogotá, where she had lived for many years.
