= Guillermo Hincapié Orozco =

Colombian civil engineer and politician (c.1926–2018)

Mayor of Medellín
- In office July 15, 1977 – September 1978
- Preceded by: Sofía Medina de López
- Succeeded by: Jorge Valencia Jaramillo

Personal details
- Born: c. 1926
- Died: December 26, 2018; Medellín, Antioquia Department, Colombia
- Spouse: María Teresa Uribe (?–2018; his death)
- Children: Three
- Education: National University of Engineering
- Occupation: Civil engineer

Guillermo Hincapié Orozco (c. 1926 – December 26, 2018) was a Colombian civil engineer and politician. He served as the Mayor of Medellín from July 15, 1977, until 1978.

== Biography ==
Hincapié was raised in the town of Támesis, Antioquia, where he attended elementary school. He studied engineering at the National University of Civil Engineering in Medellín. He had to compete with 80 other applicants to gain acceptances into the university. Hincapié recalled financial issues during his time at the university, but did not miss a single exam during his time as a student. To make ends meet, he sought a job at the Antioquia Railway, but was rejected.

Following his graduation from National University, Hincapié was hired as the Secretary of Public Works for the municipality of Bello, Antioquia, for about eight months. He then moved to Bogotá, where he worked in the city's public works department.

He returned to Antioquia Department, where he served as the departmental Undersecretary and Secretary of Public Works during Antioquia Governor Jaime Sierra García's administration. In 1977, Governor Sierra, with the approval of Colombian President Alfonso López Michelsen, appointed Hincapié as the new Mayor of Medellín. Hincapié received the appointment just two days after speaking with President López Michelsen at the opening of the 1978 Central American and Caribbean Games in Medellín.

Hincapié became Mayor of Medellín on July 15, 1977, following the resignation of outgoing Mayor Sofía Medina de López. He served as the city's mayor for fifteen months. The Horacio Toro Bridge was opened during Hincapié's administration.

Hincapié died from respiratory failure at a Medellín hospital on December 26, 2018, at the age of 92. He had been hospitalized for several days due to a respiratory illness. His wife of six decades, prominent Colombian professor and sociologist María Teresa Uribe, died six days later on January 1, 2019. They were survived by their three children: Luis Guillermo, a civil engineer, Ana Lucía, a physician, and Marta Hincapié Uribe, a filmmaker and academic. His funeral was held at San Lucas parish in El Poblado.
