= Segovia, Antioquia =

- Municipality and town

- Flag Coat of arms

- Location of the municipality and town of Segovia, Antioquia in the Antioquia Department of Colombia

- Location in Colombia
- Coordinates: 7°4′41″N 74°42′6″W
- Country: Colombia
- Department: Antioquia Department
- Subregion: Northeastern

Area
  - Municipality and town: 1,127 km^{2} (435 sq mi)
  - Urban: 3.82 km^{2} (1.47 sq mi)
- Elevation: 650 m (2,130 ft)

Population (2018 census)
  - Municipality and town: 37,900
  - Density: 33.6/km^{2} (87.1/sq mi)
  - Urban: 30,133
  - Urban density: 7,890/km^{2} (20,400/sq mi)
- Time zone: UTC-5 (Colombia Standard Time)

Segovia (Spanish pronunciation: [seˈɣoβja]) is a town and municipality in Antioquia Department, Colombia. Part of the subregion of Northeastern Antioquia, its elevation is 650 m (2,130 ft) above sea level. There are gold mines in the area.

== Climate ==
Climate data for Segovia (Otú Airport), elevation 718 m (2,356 ft), (1981–2010)
Month	Jan	Feb	Mar	Apr	May	Jun	Jul	Aug	Sep	Oct	Nov	Dec	Year
Mean daily maximum °C (°F)	28.6 (83.5)	29.1 (84.4)	28.9 (84.0)	29.1 (84.4)	29.2 (84.6)	29.4 (84.9)	29.6 (85.3)	29.7 (85.5)	29.0 (84.2)	28.6 (83.5)	28.2 (82.8)	28.2 (82.8)	29 (84)
Daily mean °C (°F)	24.8 (76.6)	25.0 (77.0)	24.9 (76.8)	25.0 (77.0)	25.0 (77.0)	25.1 (77.2)	25.1 (77.2)	25.2 (77.4)	24.9 (76.8)	24.8 (76.6)	24.6 (76.3)	24.7 (76.5)	24.9 (76.8)
Mean daily minimum °C (°F)	20.0 (68.0)	20.2 (68.4)	20.4 (68.7)	20.4 (68.7)	20.3 (68.5)	20.1 (68.2)	19.9 (67.8)	20.0 (68.0)	20.0 (68.0)	20.0 (68.0)	20.1 (68.2)	20.0 (68.0)	20.1 (68.2)
Average precipitation mm (inches)	60.9 (2.40)	77.0 (3.03)	121.5 (4.78)	281.1 (11.07)	325.3 (12.81)	280.3 (11.04)	296.5 (11.67)	336.2 (13.24)	361.4 (14.23)	368.0 (14.49)	265.4 (10.45)	132.7 (5.22)	2,906.3 (114.42)
Average precipitation days (≥ 1.0 mm)	9	10	11	18	19	18	18	20	20	21	18	12	190
Average relative humidity (%)	85	85	86	86	85	85	84	84	86	86	86	86	85
Mean monthly sunshine hours	173.6	144.0	120.9	114.0	136.4	156.0	195.3	179.8	144.0	133.3	138.0	161.2	1,796.5
Mean daily sunshine hours	5.6	5.1	3.9	3.8	4.4	5.2	6.3	5.8	4.8	4.3	4.6	5.2	4.9
Source: Instituto de Hidrologia Meteorologia y Estudios Ambientales

== Gold Mines ==
Segovia is widely known for its intensive gold mining operations, where the recent collapse of the La Reliquia mine's main entrance on 22 September 2025, due to a "geomechanical failure" trapped twenty-three workers underground for 43 hours until they were all successfully rescued on 24 September 2025.
