= Nicanor Restrepo Giraldo =

Colombian politician (1871–1938)

Mayor of Medellín
- In office February 1924 – January 1925
- Preceded by: Henrique Gaviria
- Succeeded by: Alfonso Vieira Jaramillo

Governor of Jericó
- In office 1908–1909
- Preceded by: Position established

Mayor of Medellín
- In office March 1904 – September 1908
- Preceded by: Antonio M. Ramírez
- Succeeded by: Jesús Escobar

Personal details
- Born: June 1871 Medellín, Antioquia, Colombia
- Died: May 19, 1938 (aged 66) Medellín, Antioquia, Colombia
- Spouse: Ana Jesús Correa Correa
- Occupation: Businessman; politician

Nicanor Restrepo Giraldo (June 1871 – 19 May 1938) was a Colombian businessman and politician who served as Mayor of Medellín from 1904 to 1908, and later from 1924 to 1925. He also served as Governor of the now-defunct Department of Jericó from 1908 to 1909.

== Biography ==
Restrepo Giraldo was born in June 1871 in Medellín, Colombia, to parents Lisandro Restrepo Arango and Dolores Giraldo Gómez.

== See also ==
- List of mayors of Medellín
