= Daniel Quintero (Colombian politician) =

Colombian politician

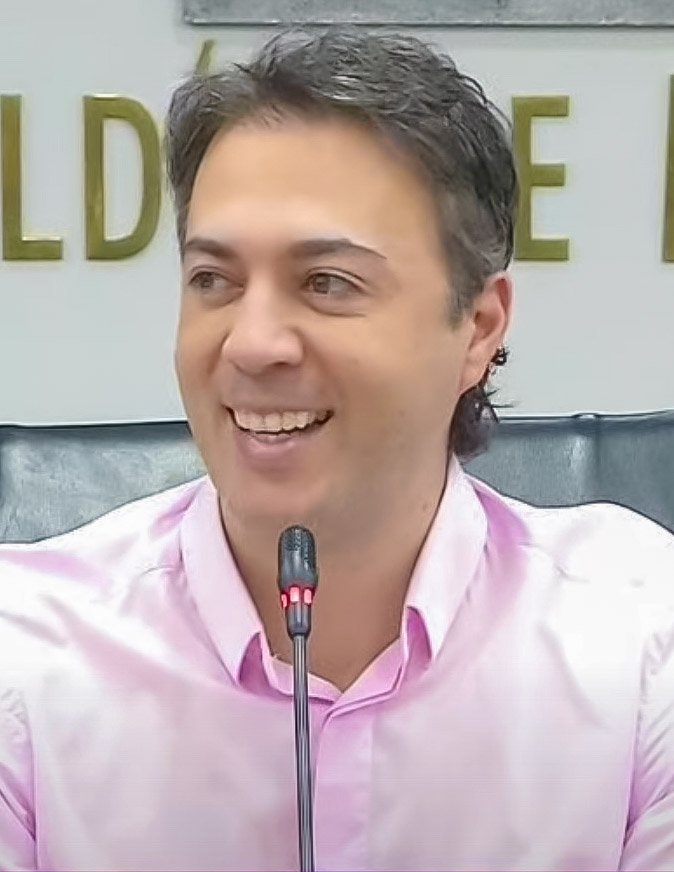

Mayor of Medellín
- In office 1 January 2020 (Note: Suspended from 10 May – 21 June 2022) – 31 December 2023
- Preceded by: Federico Gutiérrez
- Succeeded by: Federico Gutiérrez

Deputy Minister of the Digital Economy
- In office 26 July 2016 – 4 December 2017
- President: Juan Manuel Santos
- Minister: David Luna Sánchez
- Preceded by: Isabel Mejía
- Succeeded by: Juanita Rodríguez

Personal details
- Born: Daniel Quintero Calle; 26 July 1980 (age 46) Medellín, Antioquia, Colombia
- Citizenship: Colombian
- Party: Independent
- Education: University of Antioquia, University of The Andes, Boston University
- Occupation: Engineer, politician

Daniel Quintero Calle (born 26 July 1980) is a Colombian politician who served as the mayor of Medellín between 2020 and 2023. Quintero was controversially suspended from 10 May to 21 June 2022 by inspector general Margarita Cabello Blanco for allegedly attempting to interfere in the 2022 presidential election. The youngest individual to hold that office thus far, Quintero was previously the Deputy Minister of the Digital Economy from 2016 to 2017, in the government of President Juan Manuel Santos.

== Early life and education ==
Daniel Quintero Calle was born in Campo Valdés, a suburb on the northeastern slopes of the Aburrá Valley. Soon after he was born, the family moved to Tricentenario, a working-class suburb further north of the city center, where Quintero and his two brothers were raised by their single mother, Stella Calle, a self-employed woman.

Quintero commenced his university studies at the early age of 14 when he enrolled in the National University of Colombia. However, that same year his mother (39) suffered a fatal heart attack that exacerbated the family's financial situation. Quintero was forced to interrupt his university studies soon after his mother's death due to financial hardship. To survive, Quintero and his brothers tried all sorts of informal self-employed jobs such as street vending, delivering parcels and selling home-cooked desserts.

Over the next four years Quintero attempted to resume his university studies several times, but was unable to afford his ongoing tuition fees. Eventually an employee in the university enrollments office took pity on him and offered to pay his tuition fees. Quintero resumed his studies in 1999 and in 2004 earned his undergraduate degree in Electronic Engineering at the University of Antioquia.

Between 2004 and 2008, he also completed further specialization studies in applied finance at University of Los Andes, Bogotá.

In 2009, he travelled to the United States to complete a short course in Public Financial Management at the Harvard Kennedy School of Government.

In 2011, Quintero travelled to the United States again to pursue postgraduate studies at Boston University, Massachusetts. There he earned a master's degree in business administration (MBA) a year later.

== Personal life ==
Quintero is married to Diana Marcela Osorio with whom he has two daughters.

Quintero grew up with his two brothers, Miguel Andrés and Juan David. Although he did not grow up with his father, Orlando Quintero, a car mechanic, Quintero maintains a close relationship with him. A third half-brother, Diego, did not grow up with Daniel and his brother.

== Professional career ==
In January 2004, Quintero founded a software development company (Intrasoft S.A.) and served as its CEO until 2012.

In March 2015, he was appointed as the CEO of INNpulsa Colombia, a government agency focused on promoting productivity, entrepreneurship and innovation in Colombia. He served in that position until July 2016, when he was called by the then President of Colombia, Juan Manuel Santos, to serve as the Deputy Minister of Digital Economy in the Ministry of Information, Technologies and Communications (TIC).

== Political career ==
From childhood Quintero has been interested in the causes of social inequality and the ongoing lack of development opportunities that affect millions of Colombians.

In 2007, he commenced his political career when he ran unsuccessfully for a seat in the Medellín Council under the support of the Conservative Party.

In 2013, he founded the Tomate Party, a movement that reached 80,000 followers and was fueled by 90,000 businesses collectively. 'Tomate' is a play on the word 'tómate', the Spanish expression for 'take it', which aimed at inviting ordinary citizens to 'take' responsibility and engage in the political process. Their campaign tactics were, of course, 'tomatadas' (protesting by throwing tomatoes), 'cacerolazos' (protesting by beating on frying pans), the 'cicladas' and several other pacific representations. The message was environmental, political awareness, education and cultural expressions. The party did not achieve political representation because of it was unable to raise $230 million pesos to reach the required threshold applicable to local elections.

In the 2014 national elections Quintero ran for a seat in Congress (House of Representatives) representing Bogotá D.C. under the support of the Liberal Party. He launched his campaign by jumping off a bridge while hanging of a rock climbing rope. While jumping, the candidate proclaimed: 'I feel Liberal'; again, a play on a form of the Spanish word 'libre', meaning 'free'.

In the 2018 presidential elections, Quintero campaigned for Humberto de la Calle, the candidate for the Liberal Party and key participant in the Peace Process that had recently resulted in a historical peace agreement between the Government and FARC (Colombian Revolutionary Armed Forces). The peace process required a national referendum which Quintero strongly supported and actively campaigned for. Upon Humberto de la Calle's defeat in the first round of the presidential elections, Quintero went on to support and campaign for the leader of the Colombia Humana Party, Gustavo Petro.

Quintero was elected Mayor of Medellin in October 2019 while running under the banner of the political movement Independientes (Independents). He won office with a record number of votes and at the age of 39 became the youngest ever mayor of Medellín.

=== Suspension as mayor ===
Quintero posted a video on Twitter on 10 May 2022 and stated "change in the first", allegedly referencing a possible first-round victory of opposition Historic Pact presidential nominee Gustavo Petro. Inspector general Margarita Cabello Blanco suspended Quintero as mayor several hours later for three months for allegedly attempting to interfere with the 2022 presidential election. Colombian law does not permit public officials the right to participate in electoral politics. Quintero responded by criticising the event as a "dictatorial act." His suspension was denounced as unconstitutional by opposition politicians and members of the Medellín government, with legal experts asserting Cabello's actions may violate the law. The Inter-American Human Rights court does not permit the hiatus of elected officeholders by the inspector-general without a criminal court order. President Iván Duque appointed a political supporter of his, Juan Camilo Restrepo, to serve as mayor in the interim, in defiance of the constitution, which prohibits the appointment of political allies of the head of state to mayoral offices. Opposition politicians condemned Restrepo's appointment as "illegitimate." Opponents of the decision also have implied hypocrisy in the Duque Administration, as commander of the National Army of Colombia General Eduardo Zapateiro, who was under investigation by the office of the inspector general at the time for publicly expressing his disapproval of Gustavo Petro, had not been suspended from his position. Cabello lifted Quintero's suspension, permitting him to resume his duties on 21 June, following the conclusion of the second round of the presidential election.

Resignation

== Charges ==
On April 22, 2025, a judge upheld the charges brought by prosecutors on April 8 against Daniel Quintero and former officials of his administration over alleged embezzlement for the benefit of third parties, undue interest in the execution of contracts, and malfeasance by action in connection with the Aguas Vivas case. Quintero and the other defendants pleaded not guilty.

== Notes ==
Political offices
Preceded by Isabel Mejía	Deputy Minister of the Digital Economy; 2016–2017	Succeeded by Juanita Rodríguez
Preceded by Federico Gutiérrez	Mayor of Medellín; 2020–present	Incumbent
