= Amalfi Airport (Colombia) =

- IATA: AFI; ICAO: SKAM

Summary
- Airport type: Public
- Serves: Amalfi, Colombia
- Elevation AMSL: 4,826 ft / 1,471 m
- Coordinates: 6°53′40″N 75°02′50″W

Map

Runways
Direction	Length		Surface
Direction	m	ft	Surface
16/34	950	3,117	Grass
- Sources: GCM

Amalfi Airport (IATA: AFI, ICAO: SKAM) is an airport serving the town of Amalfi, in the Antioquia Department of Colombia. The runway is 3 kilometres (1.9 mi) east of the town, in the valley of the Porce River. Ridgelines lie within 1 kilometre (0.6 mi) east and west of the runway.

== See also ==
- Transport in Colombia
- List of airports in Colombia
