= Yolombó =

- Municipality and town
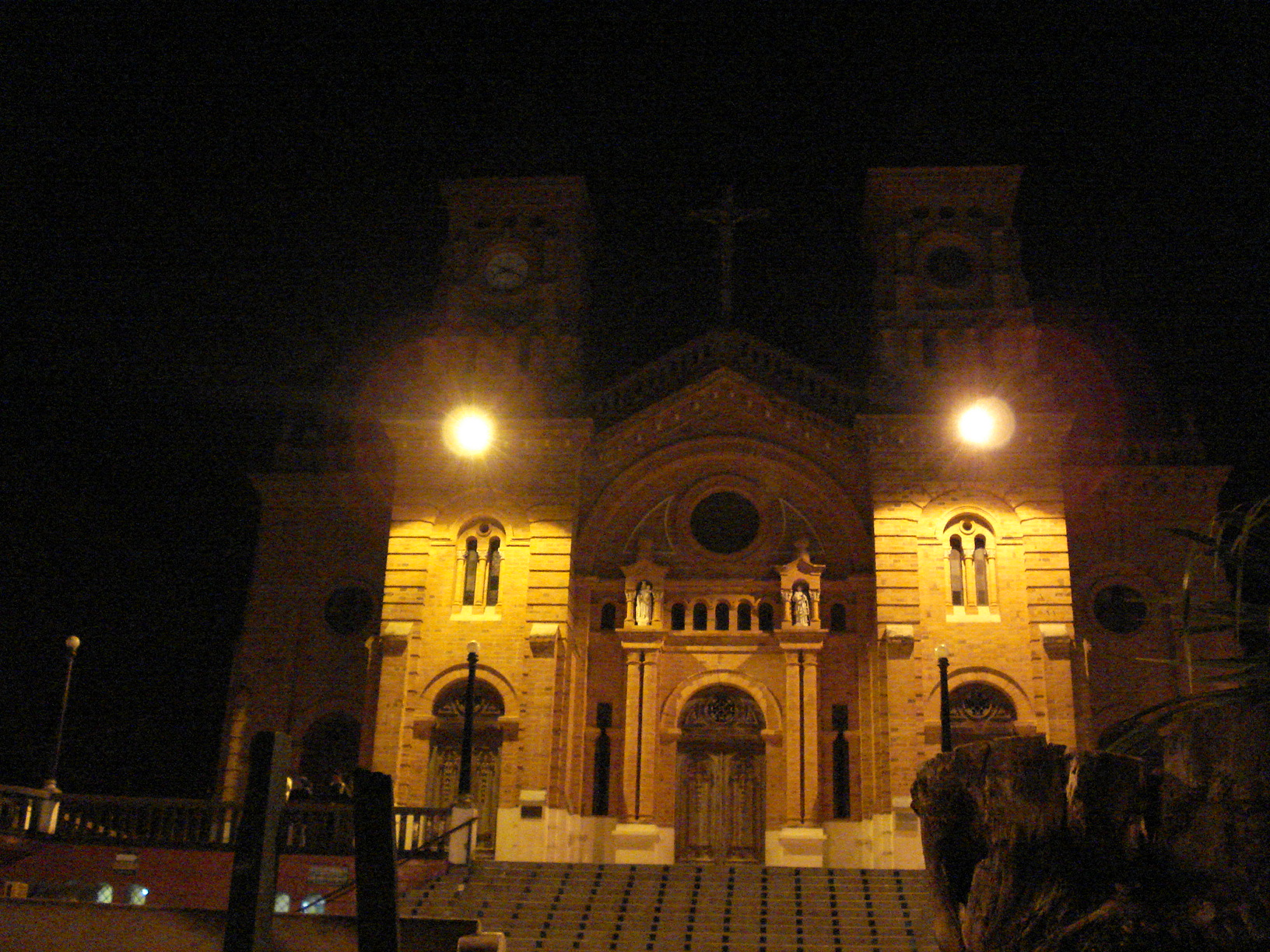

- Flag Coat of arms

- Location of the municipality and town of Yolombó in the Antioquia Department of Colombia

- Location in Colombia
- Coordinates: 6°35′52″N 75°0′44″W
- Country: Colombia
- Department: Antioquia Department
- Subregion: Northeastern

Area
  - Total: 941 km^{2} (363 sq mi)
- Elevation: 1,450 m (4,760 ft)

Population (2015)
  - Total: 23,958
- Time zone: UTC-5 (Colombia Standard Time)
- Website: www.yolombo-antioquia.gov.co

Yolombó is a town and municipality in the Colombian department of Antioquia. It is part of the subregion of Northeastern Antioquia, located 108 km from Medellín.

== History ==
Yolombó is an indigenous term that comes from the area. In 1535, Don Pedro de Heredia, the founder of Cartagena de Indias, discovered, in the Antioquian region, a village of indigenous people of the same name, Yolombó. The town was initially called, "San Lorenzo de Yolombó." No official date of its founding is known to exist.

In the middle of the 17th century, gold was found in the area and made Yolombó a celebrated and important town. Parish records revealed the growing prominence of the town by the settlement of high ranking Spanish families. Up until 1750, its prosperity earned Yolombó the name, Ciudad Illustre (Illustrious City). However, the prosperity was short-lived. Between 1760 and 1800 the gold mines were depleted with the advent and use of efficient mining technology. Following this economic decline, Yolombó was downgraded to a township of the city Santo Domingo in 1879 until 1883. In 1883 Yolombó was once again promoted to the status of District and Township and it has remained as such until 2009 when it became a municipality.

Yolombó has a diverse climate and rich biodiversity. At 1,450m above sea level, the mountainous landscape offers both scorching and frigid temperatures. It is known for its exotic agriculture, forests full of medicinal plants and precious wood, and is also a land that is abundant in water and pasture.

== Demographics ==
Total Population: 23,958 (2015)

- Urban Population: 7,216
- Rural Population: 16,742

Total Literacy Rate: 84.3% (2005)

- Urban Literacy Rate: 90.5%
- Rural Literacy Rate: 81.5%

According to DANE census records from 2005, the racial makeup of Yolombó is composed of:

- Mestizo & White (98.0%)
- Afrocolombian (1.9%)
- Indigenous (0.1%)

== Climate ==
Yolombó has a tropical rainforest climate (Af) with heavy rainfall the year round.

Climate data for Yolombó, elevation 1,540 m (5,050 ft), (1961–1990)
Month	Jan	Feb	Mar	Apr	May	Jun	Jul	Aug	Sep	Oct	Nov	Dec	Year
Mean daily maximum °C (°F)	25.3 (77.5)	25.7 (78.3)	25.5 (77.9)	24.5 (76.1)	25.2 (77.4)	24.6 (76.3)	25.1 (77.2)	25.2 (77.4)	25.1 (77.2)	24.6 (76.3)	24.1 (75.4)	25.1 (77.2)	25.0 (77.0)
Daily mean °C (°F)	19.7 (67.5)	19.7 (67.5)	20.0 (68.0)	19.6 (67.3)	20.0 (68.0)	19.6 (67.3)	19.7 (67.5)	20.0 (68.0)	19.8 (67.6)	19.2 (66.6)	18.8 (65.8)	19.6 (67.3)	19.6 (67.4)
Mean daily minimum °C (°F)	16.6 (61.9)	16.5 (61.7)	16.7 (62.1)	16.3 (61.3)	16.6 (61.9)	16.3 (61.3)	16.0 (60.8)	16.3 (61.3)	16.2 (61.2)	16.1 (61.0)	16.0 (60.8)	16.5 (61.7)	16.3 (61.4)
Average precipitation mm (inches)	71.1 (2.80)	100.1 (3.94)	159.3 (6.27)	281.9 (11.10)	336.9 (13.26)	244.5 (9.63)	224.3 (8.83)	288.7 (11.37)	345.9 (13.62)	367.5 (14.47)	243.3 (9.58)	105.2 (4.14)	2,768.7 (109.01)
Average precipitation days	5	8	10	15	16	13	13	15	17	17	13	8	150
Source 1: FAO
Source 2: Instituto de Hidrologia Meteorologia y Estudios Ambientales (precipitation 1981–2010)

== Notable residents ==
- Sofía Medina de López – Colombian politician, first female Mayor of Medellín (1976–1977)

== Yolombó in the media ==
Yolombó was popularized in part by Tomás Carrasquilla's historical novel, "La Marquesa de Yolombó" (The Marchioness of Yolombó).
