= María Teresa Uribe =

Colombian sociologist (1940–2019)

- Born: 9 February 1940; Pereira, Colombia
- Died: 1 January 2019 (aged 78); Medellín, Colombia
- Education: National University of Colombia at Medellín
- Occupations: Sociologist; Lecturer
- Spouse: Guillermo Hincapié Orozco (?–2018; his death)

María Teresa Uribe de Hincapié (9 February 1940 – 1 January 2019) was a Colombian sociologist, specialising in research into conflict and violence.

== Early life and education ==
Born in Pereira, Risaralda, in 1940, Uribe grew up during the period of Colombian civil war known as La Violencia. Injured and wounded travellers, displaced from their rural homes, came to her family home in the 1950s seeking medical treatment from her father, a doctor, and Uribe helped him to care for them. She later stated that this early experience of the result of conflict inspired her academic research interests.

Uribe studied sociology at the Universidad Pontificia Bolivariana in Medellín and later completed a master's degree in urban planning at the National University of Colombia there.

== Career ==
In 1973, following her graduation, she took a position as a lecturer at the University of Antioquia. There, she met Carlos Gaviria Díaz; he introduced her to the newly emerging field of political science, which began to influence her sociological work. From 1991, Uribe worked on her research projects in the university's Institute of Political Studies.

Uribe retired from the university in 2005; in 2007 she was invited to participate in the country's first Historical Memory project, however, she was only able to be involved for six months due to poor health.

Uribe was invited to contribute to a number of national and local political conversations during her career, such as roundtable negotiations with the 19 April guerilla movement, and talks with Medellín militia, aimed at de-mobilising paramilitaries.

== Awards and honors ==
In 1999, Uribe received the University of Antioquia's Research Award, and in 2004 the Francisco Antonio Zea University Merit. In 2015 she was awarded an honorary doctorate by the University of Antioquia.

== Personal life ==
Uribe's husband, Guillermo Hincapié Orozco, was a mayor of Medellín. He pre-deceased her by six days. Uribe died on 1 January 2019 at a health care center in Medellín.

== Publications ==
- Poderes y regiones : problemas en la constitución de la Nación Colombiana, 1810–1850 (Powers and regions: problems in the constitution of Colombia, 1810–1850) University of Antioquia; Medellín; 1987
- La territorialidad de los conflictos y de la violencia en Antioquia (The territoriality of conflicts and violence in Antioquia) University of Antioquia; Medellín; 1990
- Uraba: region o territorio : un analisis en el contexto de la politica, la historia y la etnicidad (Region or Territory: an analysis in the context of politics, history and ethnicity) University of Antioquia; Medellín; 1992
- Nación, ciudadano y soberano (Nationhood, citizenship and sovereignty) Corporation Region; Medellín; 2001
