= Northeastern Antioquia =

Subregion in the Colombian Department of Antioquia

Location of the Northeastern Antioquia region within the Antioquia Department.

Northeastern Antioquia is a sub-region in the Colombian Department of Antioquia. The region comprises 10 municipalities.

== Municipalities ==
- Amalfi
- Anorí
- Cisneros
- Remedios
- San Roque
- Santo Domingo
- Segovia
- Vegachi
- Yali
- Yolombo
