= Yalí =

Yalí, Antioquia
- Municipality and town
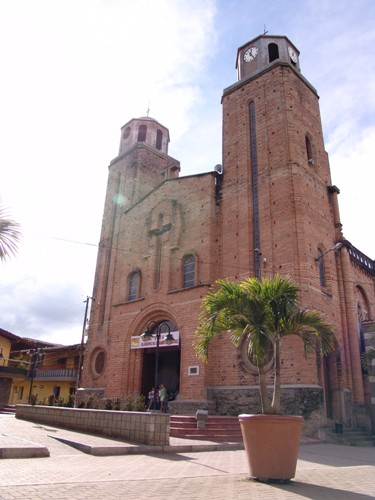

- Flag

- Location of the municipality and town of Yalí, Antioquia in the Antioquia Department of Colombia

- Location in Colombia
- Coordinates: 6°40′36″N 74°50′28″W
- Country: Colombia
- Department: Antioquia Department
- Subregion: Northeastern
- Elevation: 1,250 m (4,100 ft)
- Time zone: UTC-5 (Colombia Standard Time)

Yalí is a town and municipality located in northeastern Antioquia Department, Colombia, colloquially called "the town of hills". Part of the sub-region of Northeastern Antioquia, it lies at an altitude of 1,250 m (4,100 ft) above sea level.

Yalí was established as a municipality in 1956 and was named after one of its founders; Lorenzo Yalí. In its early days the town's economy relied on mining, now the economic activity is focused on the "cañicultura" (sugarcane plantations) with aims of production of panela.
