= Anorí =

- Municipality and town
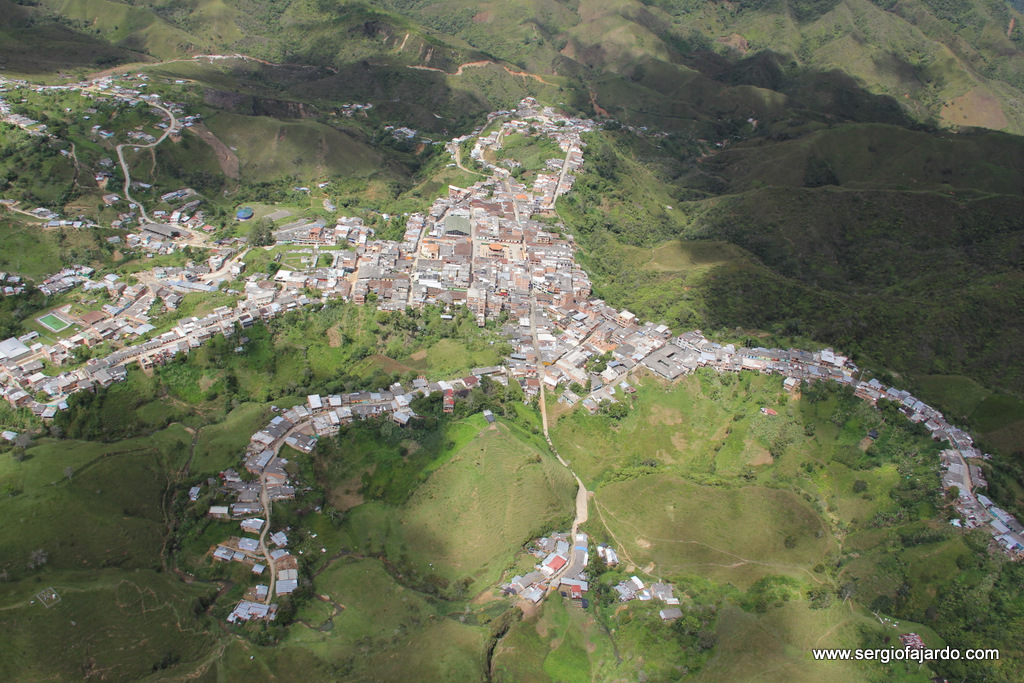
- View of Anorí

- Flag Coat of arms

- Location of the municipality and town of Anorí in the Antioquia Department of Colombia

- Location in Colombia
- Coordinates: 7°04′25″N 75°08′45″W
- Country: Colombia
- Department: Antioquia Department
- Subregion: Northeastern

Area
  - Total: 1,430 km^{2} (550 sq mi)

Population (Census 2018)
  - Total: 14,502
  - Density: 10.1/km^{2} (26.3/sq mi)
- Time zone: UTC-5 (Colombia Standard Time)

Anorí is a town and municipality in the Antioquia Department, Colombia. It is part of the subregion of Northeastern Antioquia. The cloud forest near Anorí forms the majority of the range of the endemic, critically endangered chestnut-capped piha.

The population was 14,502 at the 2018 census.

== Climate ==
Climate data for Anorí, elevation 1,610 m (5,280 ft), (1981–2010)
Month	Jan	Feb	Mar	Apr	May	Jun	Jul	Aug	Sep	Oct	Nov	Dec	Year
Mean daily maximum °C (°F)	23.1 (73.6)	23.1 (73.6)	23.2 (73.8)	23.5 (74.3)	24.1 (75.4)	24.6 (76.3)	24.8 (76.6)	24.9 (76.8)	24.3 (75.7)	23.5 (74.3)	23.1 (73.6)	23.0 (73.4)	23.8 (74.8)
Daily mean °C (°F)	18.6 (65.5)	18.7 (65.7)	18.9 (66.0)	19.2 (66.6)	19.6 (67.3)	19.8 (67.6)	19.8 (67.6)	19.8 (67.6)	19.4 (66.9)	19.0 (66.2)	18.8 (65.8)	18.7 (65.7)	19.2 (66.6)
Mean daily minimum °C (°F)	14.9 (58.8)	15.2 (59.4)	15.6 (60.1)	16.1 (61.0)	16.2 (61.2)	16.1 (61.0)	15.8 (60.4)	15.9 (60.6)	15.7 (60.3)	15.7 (60.3)	15.6 (60.1)	15.4 (59.7)	15.7 (60.3)
Average precipitation mm (inches)	58.3 (2.30)	111.5 (4.39)	156.3 (6.15)	270.8 (10.66)	320.7 (12.63)	296.9 (11.69)	313.3 (12.33)	318.4 (12.54)	327.6 (12.90)	314.8 (12.39)	229.9 (9.05)	119.9 (4.72)	2,838.5 (111.75)
Average precipitation days (≥ 1.0 mm)	10	12	16	21	24	22	23	23	23	24	21	14	228
Average relative humidity (%)	90	90	90	90	89	86	84	85	87	89	90	91	88
Mean monthly sunshine hours	139.5	110.1	99.2	87.0	114.7	153.0	182.9	167.4	120.0	102.3	105.0	114.7	1,495.8
Mean daily sunshine hours	4.5	3.9	3.2	2.9	3.7	5.1	5.9	5.4	4.0	3.3	3.5	3.7	4.1
Source: Instituto de Hidrologia Meteorologia y Estudios Ambientales
