= Mayor of Medellín =

- Mayoral version of the Seal of Medellín
- Incumbent; Federico Gutiérrez since 1 January 2024
- Residence: Medellín
- Term length: 4 years
- Inaugural holder: Pantaleón Callejas
- Formation: 1863
- Website: www.medellin.gov.co

This is a list of mayors of Medellín, Colombia.

== Ordinary mayors of Villa de la Candelaria ==
Until 1863, the administrator of Medellin was known as the Ordinary Mayor of Villa de la Candelaria de Medellín.

- José Zapata y Múnera
- Tomás Ibarra Gil
- Carlos de Molina y Toledo
- José Álvarez del Pino
- Lorenzo Zapata Gómez de Múnera
- Juan Bautista de Mesa
- Francisco de Saldarriaga
- José Zapata y Múnera
- Juan de Londoño and Trasmiera
- Peter of Acevedo
- Francisco Castaño Ponce
- Carlos de Cevallos
- Diego Molina and Beltrán
- Francisco Clemente de Mesa
- Pedro de Celada Hidalgo
- Antonio Velásquez de Obando
- Juan Gómez de Salazar
- Alfonso Cristóbal de Toro
- Diego de Castrillon Bernaldo de Quirós
- Clemente de Molina and Toledo
- Lorenzo Zapata and Gómez
- Juan Esteban Jaramillo
- Juan Vélez de Rivera
- Antonio de la Serna
- Diego de Molina and Toledo
- Sebastian Pérez Moreno
- Clemente de Molina and Toledo
- Juan de Montoya
- Diego de Molina and Beltrán
- Alonso Jaramillo de Andrade
- Pedro de Celada Hidalgo
- José de Saldarriaga
- Lorenzo Zapata Gómez
- Juan Tirado Cabello
- Juan Zapata Gómez
- Antonio de Yarza
- Pablo de Ossa Zapata
- José Vasco Alvarado
- Lorenzo Zapata Gómez
- Bartolomé Gómez
- Hair Pulling
- Manuel of Toro Zapata
- Pablo de Ossa Zapata
- Cristóbal Toro Zapata
- Pedro de Inoso
- José Álvarez del Pino
- Sebastian Pérez Moreno
- Manuel de Espinosa
- Alonso Jaramillo de Andrade
- Peter of Acevedo
- Francisco Cataño Ponce de León
- Diego de Toro and Zapata
- José de Saldarriaga
- José de Ossa Zapata
- Antonio Londoño
- Carlos Álvarez del Pino
- Matthew Álvarez del Pino
- Pedro Leonil de Estrada
- Captain Francisco Mesa Villamil
- Francisco Díaz de Mazo
- Juan Tirado Cabello
- Sgt. Diego Ibáñez
- Antonio Velasquez
- Pedro Jiménez Fajardo
- Diego de Molina and Beltrán
- Ignacio de Cárdenas
- Francisco de Villa
- Francisco Ángel Pérez de la Calle
- José de Salazar
- Captain Enrique Velásquez Obando
- Sebastian Pérez Moreno
- Juan Francisco Cano
- Matthew Álvarez del Pino
- Antonio Quintana
- Cristóbal de Toro Zapata
- Antonio Velásquez de Obando
- José Saldarriaga
- Antonio Londoño
- José de Estrada
- Captain Juan Fernández de la Torre
- Manuel of Toro Zapata
- Francisco Ángel Pérez de la Calle
- Francisco Miguel de Villa y Castañeda
- Ignacio Javier Gómez de Viana
- Sebastián de Saldarriaga
- Domingo Ibáñez Cataño
- Enrique Velásquez de Obando
- Agustín de Villa y Castañeda
- Carlos Álvarez del Pino
- Antonio Quintana
- José de Saldarriaga
- Matthew Álvarez del Pino
- Nicolás Jaramillo
- Captain Juan Fernández de la Torre
- Nicolás Tirado Zapata
- Francisco Javier Félix de Mesa
- Francisco Miguel Pérez de la Calle
- Fernando Barrientos
- Carlos Álvarez del Pino
- Jose Palacios
- Enrique Velásquez
- Nicolás Tirado
- Matthew Álvarez del Pino
- Pedro Ignacio Sánchez
- Ignacio de Saldarriaga
- Baltazar de Salazar y Caicedo
- Francisco Miguel Pérez de la Calle
- José Palacio de Estrada
- Juan de Ochoa
- Vicente de Uribe y Betancourt
- José de Saldarriaga
- Francisco Miguel de Villa
- Nicolás Jaramillo
- Juan José Lorena
- Ignacio Vélez
- José de Celis
- Miguel de Uribe
- Juan Antonio de la Madrid
- Matthew Álvarez del Pino
- Christopher Vélez
- Francisco Miguel de Villa y Castañeda
- Rafael de Ricaurte
- Javier de Mesa
- Silvestre Cadavid y García
- Francisco Ángel de la Calle
- Manuel de Uribe
- Pantaleón Callejas

== Mayors of Medellín ==
Beginning in 1863, the title of the administrator of Medellín was changed from the Ordinary Mayor of Villa de la Candelaria to simply the Mayor of Medellín.

Image	Name	Term start	Term end
	Pantaleón Callejas	1863	September 1864
	Rafael J. Vélez	January 1864	September 1864
	Salvador Vélez	September 1864	July 1866
	Manuel M. Sánchez (acting)	July 1866	July 1866
	José M. Caballero	July 1866	June 1867
	Luis M. Prieto	June 1867	August 1867
	Wenceslao Barrientos	August 1867	January 1869
	Graciliano de Villa	January 1869	June 1870
	Juan R. Mejía	June 1870	September 1871
	Liborio Echavarría	September 1871	June 1872
	Benito Uribe	June 1872	December 1872
	Juan M. Fonnegra	December 1872	December 1873
	Lino Ospina	December 1873	December 1874
	Macario Cardenas	December 1874	December 1875
	Rafael J. Vélez	December 1875	August 1876
	Esteban B. Correa	August 1876	April 1877
	Álvaro Restrepo Eusse	April 1877	May 1877
	Antonio J. Isaza	May 1877	June 1877
	Manuel A. Palacio	June 1877	December 1878
	Cesar Posada	December 1878	March 1879
	Pio González	March 1879	July 1879
	Miguel Restrepo	July 1879	December 1879
	Vicente Villegas		
	Jesús M. Morales		
	Eduardo Lopez de Mesa		
	Gabriel García		
	Jesús M. Morales		
	Manuel A. Palacio		
	Paul E. Morales		
	Climaco Hoyos		January 1881
	Ignacio Echeverry	January 1881	March 1881
	Manuel A. Palacio	March 1881	September 1881
	Manuel Vélez	September 1881	November 1881
	Majin Martínez	November 1881	December 1881
	Elías Pérez	December 1881	December 1883
	Luis M. Zea	December 1883	February 1885
	Alfonso Alvarez	February 1885	May 1885
	Lino R. Ospina	May 1885	March 1886
	Pedro P. Restrepo	March 1886	December 1886
	Nicasio Escobar	December 1886	April 1887
	Pedro P. Restrepo	April 1887	December 1887
	Tomás María Fernández	December 1887	August 1888
	Heliodoro Zapata (acting)	May 1888	June 1888
	Antonio J. Uribe (acting)	June 1888	June 1888
	Francisco Mejía	August 1888	September 1891
	Marciano Muñoz	September 1891	December 1892
	Gonzalo Correa	December 1892	April 1893
	Martin Moreno	April 1893	May 1893
	Gonzalo Correa	May 1893	September 1893
	Victor M. Salazar	September 1893	March 1894
	Rafael E. Macía (acting)	March 1894	April 1894
	Victor M. Salazar	April 1894	May 1896
	Pedro Jaime Lince	May 1896	January 1898
	Leopoldo Arango	January 1898	August 1898
	Ricardo Jaramillo	August 1898	October 1898
	Tedoso Ramírez (acting)	October 1898	November 1898
	Julio Viana	November 1898	March 1899
	Eladio Moreno	March 1899	July 1899
	Jesús María Martínez	July 1899	August 1899
	Ricardo Jiménez	August 1899	September 1899
	Alfredo Arango	September 1899	May 1900
	Elías Henao Gómez	May 1900	October 1900
	Sebastián Hoyos	October 1900	November 1901
	Heliodoro Zapata	November 1901	October 1902
	Eulogio Correa	October 1902	April 1903
	Luis F. Gómez	April 1903	October 1903
	Antonio M. Ramírez	October 1903	March 1904
	Nicanor Restrepo Giraldo	March 1904	September 1908
	Jesús Escobar	September 1908	June 1909
	Justiniano Macias	June 1909	January 1911
	Agapito Betancur	February 1911	August 1912
	Julio Ferrer	August 1912	July 1914
	Julio Viana	August 1914	December 1914
	Agapito Betancur	January 1915	December 1916
	Rafael H. Duque	January 1917	July 1918
	Agustín Jaramillo Arango	August 1918	July 1920
	Benjamin Bernal Botero	August 1920	August 1921
	Henrique Gaviria	August 1921	February 1923
	Nicanor Restrepo Giraldo	February 1924	January 1925
	Alfonso Vieira Jaramillo	January 1925	November 1925
	Rafael Restrepo	November 1925	December 1925
	Nicolás Vélez	December 1925	July 1929
	Luis Toro Escobar	July 1929	August 1930
	Ignacio Navarro Ospina	August 1930	October 1930
	Canuto Toro	October 1930	December 1934
	Luis Guillermo Echeverri	December 1934	September 1935
	Jorge Hernández	September 1935	June 1936
	Jaime Restrepo Moreno	June 1936	January 1937
	Rafael Arredondo	January 1937	April 1937
	Gustavo White Uribe	April 1937	June 1937
	Nicolás Flórez	June 1937	July 1937
	Jorge Hernández	July 1937	August 1937
	Félix María Arango	August 1937	January 1939
	Luis Mesa Villa	January 1939	July 1940
	Gabriel Hernández	July 1940	October 1941
	Jaime Ramírez Gaviria	October 1941	June 1942
	Alberto Jaramillo Osorio	June 1942	September 1942
	Pedro Olarte Sañudo	September 1942	November 1943
	Humberto Carrasquilla (acting)	November 1943	November 1943
	Gregorio Mejía	November 1943	November 1943
	Aquileo Calle	November 1943	May 1944
	José Medina	May 1944	August 1944
	Alberto Villegas	August 1944	March 1945
	Gustavo Mejía Ramírez (acting)	September 1944	September 1944
	Darío Villa (acting)	December 1944	December 1944
	Rafael Arredondo	March 1945	July 1945
	Raúl Zapata Lotero	July 1945	August 1946
	Eduardo Fernández	August 1946	December 1947
	Jorge Fernández Santamaría (acting)	December 1947	December 1947
	Juan Guillermo Restrepo	December 1947	April 1948
	Luis A. Abadía	April 1948	August 1948
	Pablo Bernal Restrepo	August 1948	November 1948
	Luis Eduardo Mejía (acting)	November 1948	January 1949
	Alfredo Molina	January 1949	February 1949
	Julio Arias Roldán	February 1949	August 1949
	Bernardo Ortiz (acting)	August 1949	September 1949
	Ignacio Betancur	September 1949	October 1949
	Pablo Bernal Restrepo	October 1949	August 1950
	Guillermo Martínez Villa (acting)	August 1950	August 1950
	J. Arturo Valencia (acting)	August 1950	August 1950
	Alberto Arango Restrepo (acting)	August 1950	August 1950
	José María Bernal	August 1950	September 1951
	José Luis Aramburu Arango (acting)	September 1951	September 1951
	Gonzalo Arango Escobar (acting)	September 1951	September 1951
	Roberto Ocampo Álvarez (acting)	September 1951	September 1951
	Luis Peláez Restrepo	September 1951	February 1952
	Jesús Muñoz (acting)	February 1952	February 1952
	Jorge Ortiz Rodríguez	February 1952	February 1953
	Gustavo Vega Bustamente (acting)	February 1953	February 1953
	Roberto Ocampo Álvarez	February 1953	June 1953
	Bernado Cock	June 1953	April 1954
	Jorge Botero Ospina	April 1954	September 1954
	Darío Londoño Villa	September 1954	November 1955
	Alberto Vélez Escobar	June 1956	October 1956
	Jorge Restrepo Uribe	October 1956	May 1957
	José Gutiérrez Gómez	May 1957	July 1957
	Hernán Villa	July 1957	August 1957
	Fernando Gómez Martínez	August 1957	February 1958
	Rafael Betancur Vélez	February 1958	September 1958
	Luis Uribe Amador	September 1958	16 April 1959
	Diego Uribe Echavarría (acting)	16 April 1959	8 May 1959
	Jacques de Bedout	8 May 1959	8 August 1959
	Ricardo Posada	8 August 1959	8 July 1960
	Samuel Cyro	8 July 1960	15 January 1961
	Emilio Montoya (acting)	15 January 1961	13 February 1961
	Bernardo Trujillo Calle	13 February 1961	1 December 1961
	Darío Arango Tamayo	1 December 1961	8 August 1962
	Federico Vásquez Uribe (acting)	8 August 1962	21 September 1962
	Darío Moreno Restrepo	21 September 1962	8 July 1963
	Guillermo Mora Londoño	6 July 1963	3 July 1964
	Evelio Ramírez Martínez	3 July 1964	8 August 1966
	Francisco Pérez Gil	8 August 1966	19 April 1967
	Jaime Tobón Villegas	19 April 1967	23 September 1968
	Ignacio Veléz Escobar	23 September 1968	4 September 1970
	Álvaro Villegas Moreno	4 September 1970	23 June 1971
	Óscar Uribe Londoño	23 June 1971	17 April 1973
	Jorge Villa Moreno (acting)	18 April 1973	11 May 1973
	Guillermo Mora Londoño	11 May 1973	30 August 1974
	Federico Moreno Vásquez	30 August 1975	7 April 1975
	Fernando Uribe	14 April 1975	11 September 1975
	Victor Cárdenas Jaramillo	11 September 1975	11 September 1976
	Sofía Medina de López	11 September 1976	July 1977
	Guillermo Hincapié Orozco	15 July 1977	September 1978
	Jorge Valencia Jaramillo	September 1978	October 1979
	Bernardo Guerra Serna	October 1979	March 1981
	José Jaime Nicholls	March 1981	July 1982
	Álvaro Uribe	October 1982	December 1982
	Juan Gaviria Gutiérrez	January 1983	April 1984
	Pablo Peláez González	May 1984	August 1986
	William Jaramillo Gómez	August 1986	1 June 1988
	Juan Gómez Martínez	1 June 1988	1 January 1990
	Omar Flórez Vélez	1 January 1990	1 January 1992
	Luis Alfredo Ramos	1 January 1992	1 January 1995
	Sergio Naranjo	1 January 1995	1 January 1998
	Juan Gómez Martínez	1 January 1998	1 January 2001
	Luis Pérez Gutiérrez	1 January 2001	1 January 2004
	Sergio Fajardo	1 January 2004	1 January 2008
	Alonso Salazar	1 January 2008	1 January 2012
	Aníbal Gaviria	1 January 2012	1 January 2016
	Federico Gutiérrez	1 January 2016	1 January 2020
	Daniel Quintero	1 January 2020	10 May 2022
80x80p	Juan Camilo Restrepo Gómez	10 May 2022	21 June 2022
	Daniel Quintero	21 June 2022	1 January 2024
	Federico Gutiérrez	1 January 2024	Incumbent

== See also ==
- List of mayors of Bogotá
