= Remedios, Antioquia =

Remedios
- Municipality and town

- Flag

- Location of the municipality and town of Remedios in the Antioquia Department of Colombia

- Location in Colombia
- Coordinates: 7°1′39″N 74°41′38″W
- Country: Colombia
- Department: Antioquia Department
- Subregion: Northeastern
- Elevation: 700 m (2,300 ft)

Population (2015)
  - Total: 29,199
- Time zone: UTC-5 (Colombia Standard Time)

Remedios is a town and municipality in the Colombian department of Antioquia. Part of the subregion of Northeastern Antioquia, it lies at an altitude of 700 m (2,300 ft) above sea level.

== Notable people ==
- Leonel Álvarez, footballer.
- Wilmar Roldán, Colombian football referee.

== Climate ==
Climate data for Remedios (Otú Airport), elevation 718 m (2,356 ft), (1981–2010)
Month	Jan	Feb	Mar	Apr	May	Jun	Jul	Aug	Sep	Oct	Nov	Dec	Year
Mean daily maximum °C (°F)	28.6 (83.5)	29.1 (84.4)	28.9 (84.0)	29.1 (84.4)	29.2 (84.6)	29.4 (84.9)	29.6 (85.3)	29.7 (85.5)	29.0 (84.2)	28.6 (83.5)	28.2 (82.8)	28.2 (82.8)	29 (84)
Daily mean °C (°F)	24.8 (76.6)	25.0 (77.0)	24.9 (76.8)	25.0 (77.0)	25.0 (77.0)	25.1 (77.2)	25.1 (77.2)	25.2 (77.4)	24.9 (76.8)	24.8 (76.6)	24.6 (76.3)	24.7 (76.5)	24.9 (76.8)
Mean daily minimum °C (°F)	20.0 (68.0)	20.2 (68.4)	20.4 (68.7)	20.4 (68.7)	20.3 (68.5)	20.1 (68.2)	19.9 (67.8)	20.0 (68.0)	20.0 (68.0)	20.0 (68.0)	20.1 (68.2)	20.0 (68.0)	20.1 (68.2)
Average precipitation mm (inches)	61.9 (2.44)	79.5 (3.13)	155.7 (6.13)	300.3 (11.82)	384.8 (15.15)	291.6 (11.48)	323.2 (12.72)	365.5 (14.39)	350.3 (13.79)	382.6 (15.06)	299.7 (11.80)	147.5 (5.81)	3,142.6 (123.72)
Average precipitation days (≥ 1.0 mm)	9	10	11	18	19	18	18	20	20	21	18	12	190
Average relative humidity (%)	85.4	84.5	85.7	86.5	84.8	85.3	83.8	84.3	85.8	85.7	86.2	86.4	85.4
Mean monthly sunshine hours	173.6	144.0	120.9	114.0	136.4	156.0	195.3	179.8	144.0	133.3	138.0	161.2	1,796.5
Mean daily sunshine hours	5.6	5.1	3.9	3.8	4.4	5.2	6.3	5.8	4.8	4.3	4.6	5.2	4.9
Source: Instituto de Hidrologia Meteorologia y Estudios Ambientales
