= Vegachí =

- Municipality and town
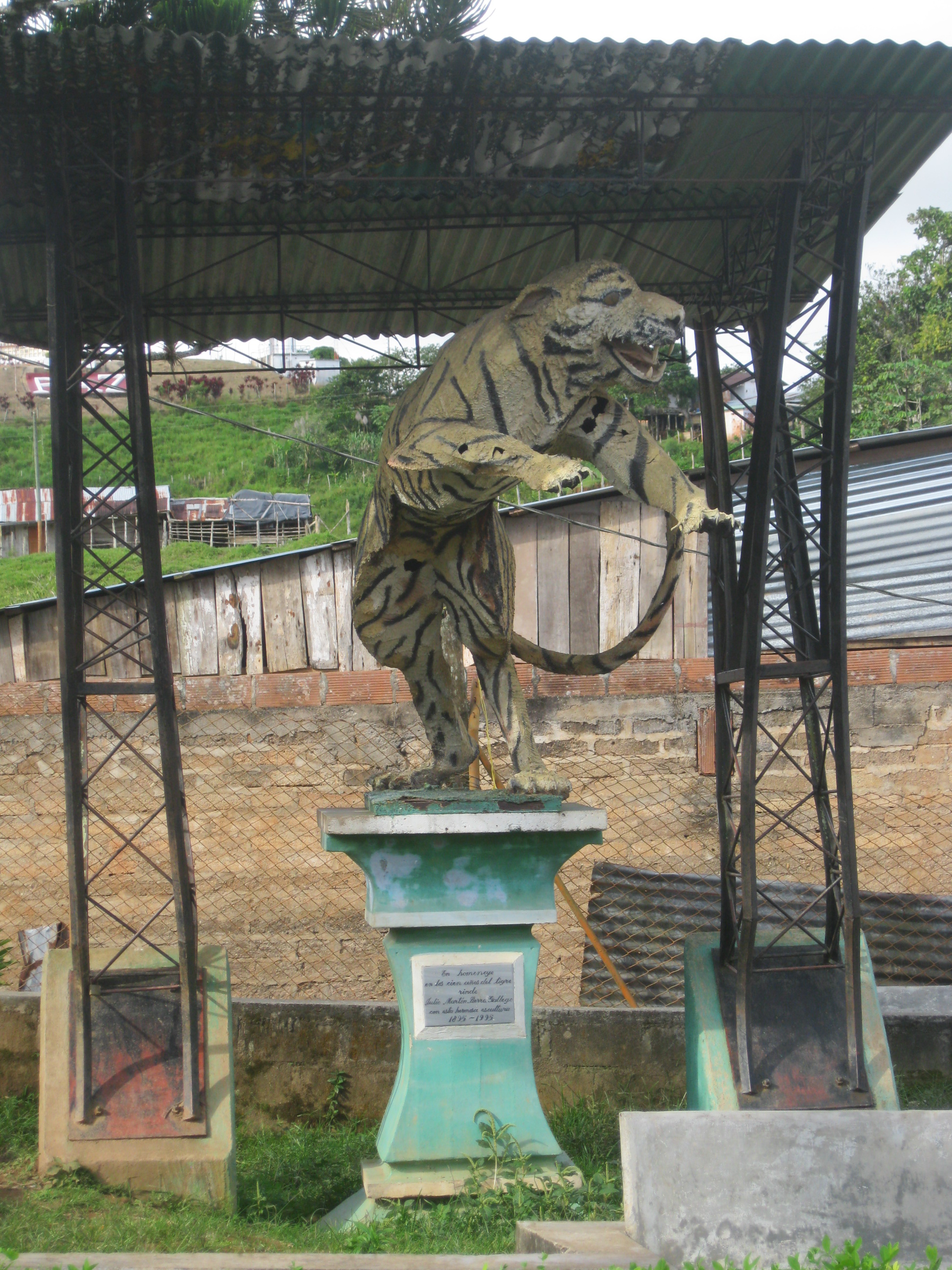

- Flag Coat of arms

- Location of the municipality and town of Vegachí in the Antioquia Department of Colombia

- Location in Colombia
- Coordinates: 6°46′23″N 74°47′58″W
- Country: Colombia
- Department: Antioquia Department
- Subregion: Northeastern
- Elevation: 980 m (3,220 ft)

Population (2015)
  - Total: 9,448
- Time zone: UTC-5 (Colombia Standard Time)

Vegachí (Spanish pronunciation: [beɣaˈtʃi]) is a town and municipality in the Colombian department of Antioquia. Part of the subregion of Northeastern Antioquia, it lies at an altitude of 980 m (3,220 ft) above sea level.

== Climate ==
Vegachí has a tropical monsoon climate (Köppen: Am) with warm temperatures and frequent rainfall. Vegachí has a long wet season from March to November, and a drier period from December to February.

Climate data for Vegachí, elevation 995 m (3,264 ft), (1981–2010)
Month	Jan	Feb	Mar	Apr	May	Jun	Jul	Aug	Sep	Oct	Nov	Dec	Year
Mean daily maximum °C (°F)	27.1 (80.8)	27.6 (81.7)	27.5 (81.5)	27.3 (81.1)	27.2 (81.0)	27.2 (81.0)	27.6 (81.7)	27.8 (82.0)	27.2 (81.0)	26.6 (79.9)	26.4 (79.5)	26.6 (79.9)	27.2 (81.0)
Daily mean °C (°F)	22.1 (71.8)	22.5 (72.5)	22.7 (72.9)	22.7 (72.9)	22.7 (72.9)	22.8 (73.0)	22.8 (73.0)	22.9 (73.2)	22.5 (72.5)	22.2 (72.0)	22.0 (71.6)	22.0 (71.6)	22.5 (72.5)
Mean daily minimum °C (°F)	17.2 (63.0)	17.7 (63.9)	17.9 (64.2)	18.2 (64.8)	18.3 (64.9)	18.1 (64.6)	17.8 (64.0)	17.9 (64.2)	18.0 (64.4)	18.0 (64.4)	17.9 (64.2)	17.5 (63.5)	17.9 (64.2)
Average precipitation mm (inches)	27.2 (1.07)	70.2 (2.76)	113.6 (4.47)	240.2 (9.46)	253.9 (10.00)	204.0 (8.03)	218.8 (8.61)	233.9 (9.21)	280.4 (11.04)	244.2 (9.61)	158.7 (6.25)	67.1 (2.64)	2,112.1 (83.15)
Average precipitation days (≥ 1.0 mm)	7	8	12	21	23	19	19	21	22	22	18	11	200
Average relative humidity (%)	87	86	87	88	88	87	86	86	87	89	90	89	87
Mean monthly sunshine hours	179.8	146.8	120.9	126.0	142.6	168.0	195.3	195.3	159.0	148.8	144.0	161.2	1,887.7
Mean daily sunshine hours	5.8	5.2	3.9	4.2	4.6	5.6	6.3	6.3	5.3	4.8	4.8	5.2	5.2
Source: Instituto de Hidrologia Meteorologia y Estudios Ambientales
