= Santo Domingo, Antioquia =

Town in Antioquia Department, Colombia

- Municipality and town
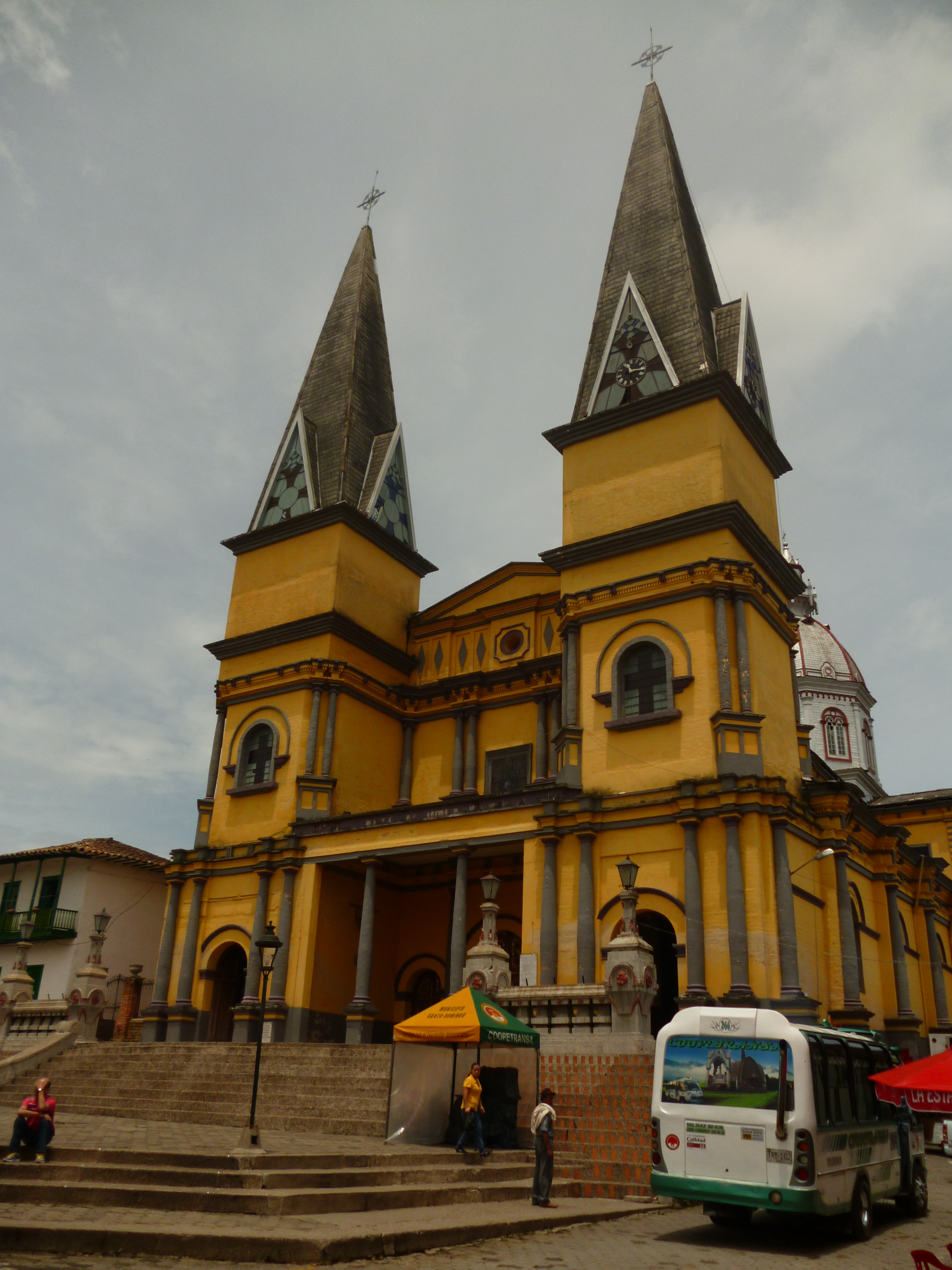

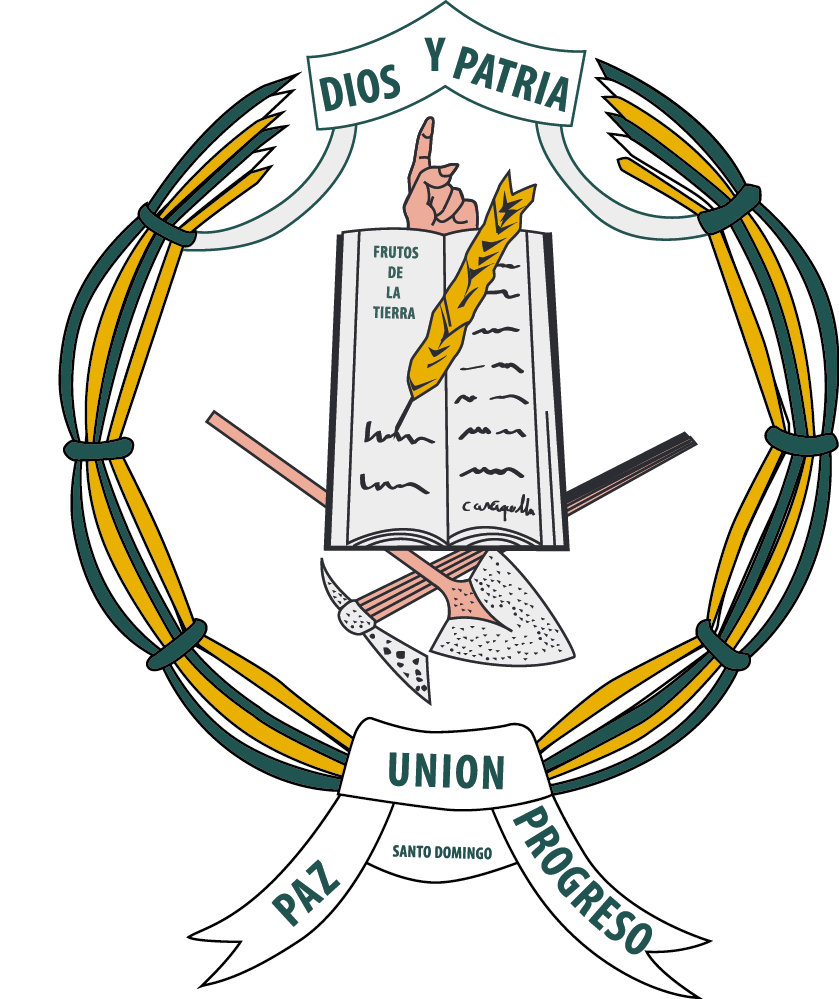
- Flag Seal

- Location of the municipality and town of Santo Domingo, Antioquia in the Antioquia Department of Colombia

- Location in Colombia
- Coordinates: 6°28′15″N 75°9′57″W
- Country: Colombia
- Department: Antioquia Department
- Subregion: Northeastern

Area
  - Total: 271 km^{2} (105 sq mi)
- Elevation: 1,975 m (6,480 ft)

Population (2018)
  - Total: 12,394
  - Density: 45.7/km^{2} (118/sq mi)
- Time zone: UTC-5 (Colombia Standard Time)

Santo Domingo is a town and municipality in the Colombian department of Antioquia. Part of the subregion of Northeastern Antioquia, it lies at an altitude of 1,975 m (6,480 ft) above sea level.

The municipio was founded in 1778 by Don Juan Gregorio Duque. In 1858, the writer Tomás Carrasquilla was born here.

== Climate ==
Climate data for Santo Domingo (Guayabito), elevation 1,700 m (5,600 ft), (1981–2010)
Month	Jan	Feb	Mar	Apr	May	Jun	Jul	Aug	Sep	Oct	Nov	Dec	Year
Mean daily maximum °C (°F)	26.2 (79.2)	26.7 (80.1)	26.7 (80.1)	26.4 (79.5)	26.3 (79.3)	26.8 (80.2)	27.2 (81.0)	27.4 (81.3)	26.8 (80.2)	25.9 (78.6)	25.7 (78.3)	25.7 (78.3)	26.5 (79.7)
Daily mean °C (°F)	21.1 (70.0)	21.4 (70.5)	21.6 (70.9)	21.5 (70.7)	21.6 (70.9)	21.7 (71.1)	21.6 (70.9)	21.7 (71.1)	21.4 (70.5)	21.1 (70.0)	21.0 (69.8)	21.0 (69.8)	21.4 (70.5)
Mean daily minimum °C (°F)	15.9 (60.6)	16.1 (61.0)	16.3 (61.3)	16.5 (61.7)	16.6 (61.9)	16.4 (61.5)	16.0 (60.8)	16.1 (61.0)	16.1 (61.0)	16.1 (61.0)	16.3 (61.3)	16.3 (61.3)	16.2 (61.2)
Average precipitation mm (inches)	122.1 (4.81)	167.6 (6.60)	240.0 (9.45)	401.0 (15.79)	498.0 (19.61)	351.3 (13.83)	369.0 (14.53)	393.3 (15.48)	474.3 (18.67)	455.4 (17.93)	325.7 (12.82)	185.5 (7.30)	3,983 (156.8)
Average precipitation days (≥ 1.0 mm)	14	15	18	23	25	21	20	22	24	26	23	18	245
Average relative humidity (%)	84	83	83	85	86	84	82	82	85	86	86	86	84
Mean monthly sunshine hours	167.4	141.2	124.0	120.0	139.5	168.0	198.4	192.2	144.0	124.0	126.0	145.7	1,790.4
Mean daily sunshine hours	5.4	5.0	4.0	4.0	4.5	5.6	6.4	6.2	4.8	4.0	4.2	4.7	4.9
Source: Instituto de Hidrologia Meteorologia y Estudios Ambientales
