= Otú Airport =

Otú Airport Alberto Jaramillo Sanchez Airport
- IATA: OTU; ICAO: SKOT

Summary
- Airport type: Public
- Owner: Aerocivil
- Serves: Remedios, Colombia
- Location: Otú
- Elevation AMSL: 2,060 ft (630 m)
- Coordinates: 7°00′37″N 74°42′55″W

Map
- Location within Antioquia Department Location within Colombia

Runways
Direction	Length		Surface
Direction	m	ft	Surface
17/35	946	3,104	Asphalt
- Source: WAD GCM HERE Maps

Otú Airport (Spanish: Aeropuerto de Otú) (IATA: OTU, ICAO: SKOT) is an airport located in the village of Otú and serving the town of Remedios, a municipality of the Antioquia Department in Colombia. It is also known as Alberto Jaramillo Sanchez Airport.

Currently only Aerolínea de Antioquia operates from this airport, with two daily flights on Twin Otter aircraft to Enrique Olaya Herrera Airport in Medellín. Previously, the airline ACES flew between this airport and Medellin several times per day on aircraft including the Let L-410 Turbolet, Cessna 206 and Twin Otter. The airport's runway is also used as a small military base for the Air Force and National Police.

The Otu VOR-DME (Ident: OTU) is located on the field.

== See also ==
- Transport in Colombia
- List of airports in Colombia
