= Antioquia Railway =

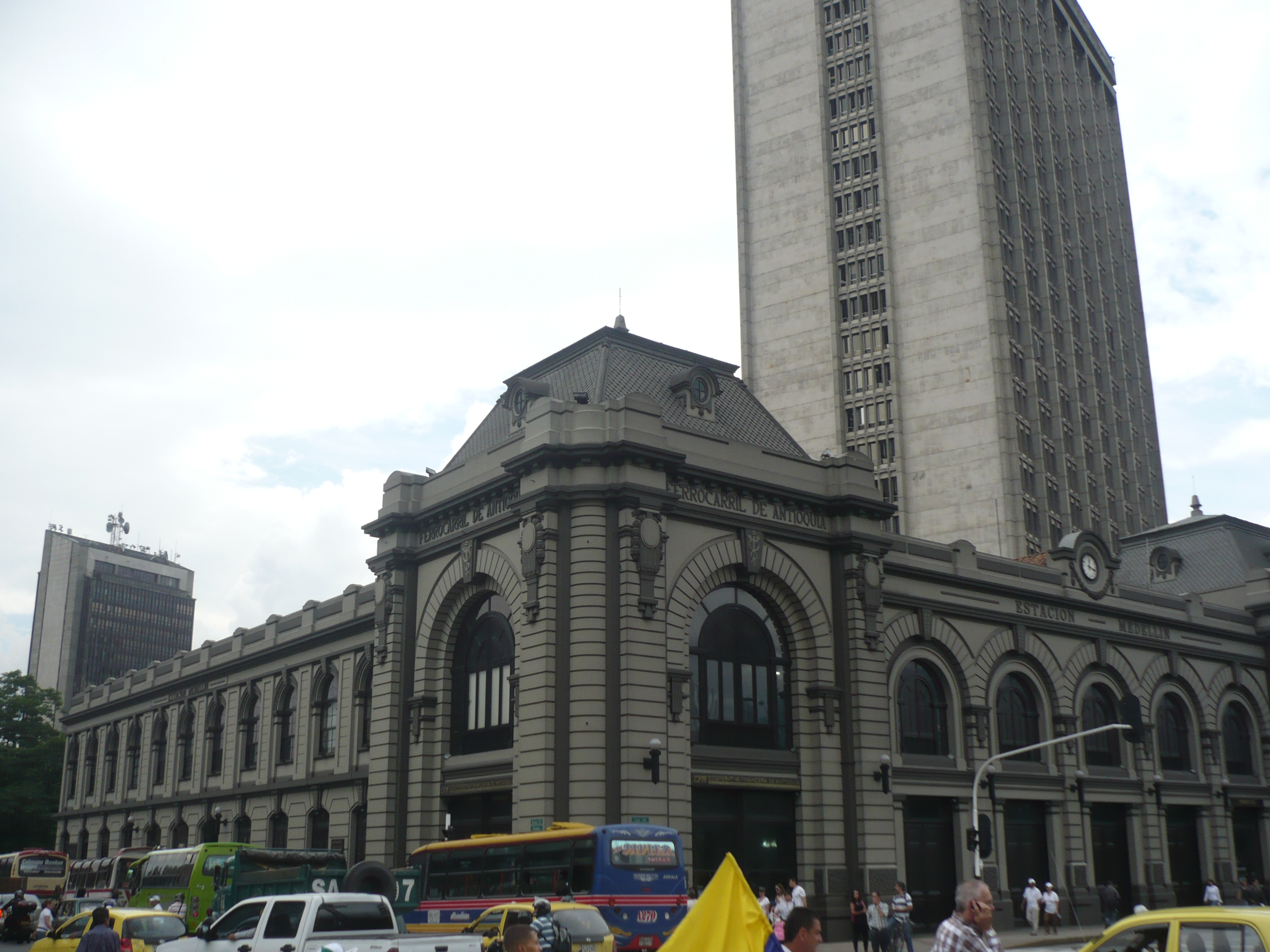
The historic Medellín station of the Antioquia Railway.

The Antioquia Railway (Spanish: Ferrocarril de Antioquia) is a historic railway system in Colombia of freight and passenger trains that joined much of the central regions of the Antioquia department along the Magdalena River, and ultimately extended to provinces located south of the department, including Caldas and the Valle del Cauca. It took 55 years to build: from 1874 to its opening on 7 August 1929. The Antioquia Railway was for decades an important link among regions that had previously been isolated and was a large contributor to economic development in the region. With the construction of alternative forms of transportation, especially roads, the use of the train declined in the 20th century. The railway was officially sold in 1961.

The railway was owned and operated by the department of Antioquia. Its purpose was to link Medellín, the commercial center of the department, with the river port Puerto Berrío, located by the Magdalena River. Prior to the railway, Antioquia was a region known only for its gold mining. After the region became more interconnected, there was a boom in almost all areas of the economy, including livestock and agriculture in the Nus region, textiles in the Medellín Valley, and coffee production in the whole department.

The historic Medellín station of the railway still exists in Plaza Cisneros. It is a neoclassical building designed by Enrique Olarte.

The private, non-profit organization "Antioquia Railway Foundation" was started on 26 July 1986.

== Early history ==
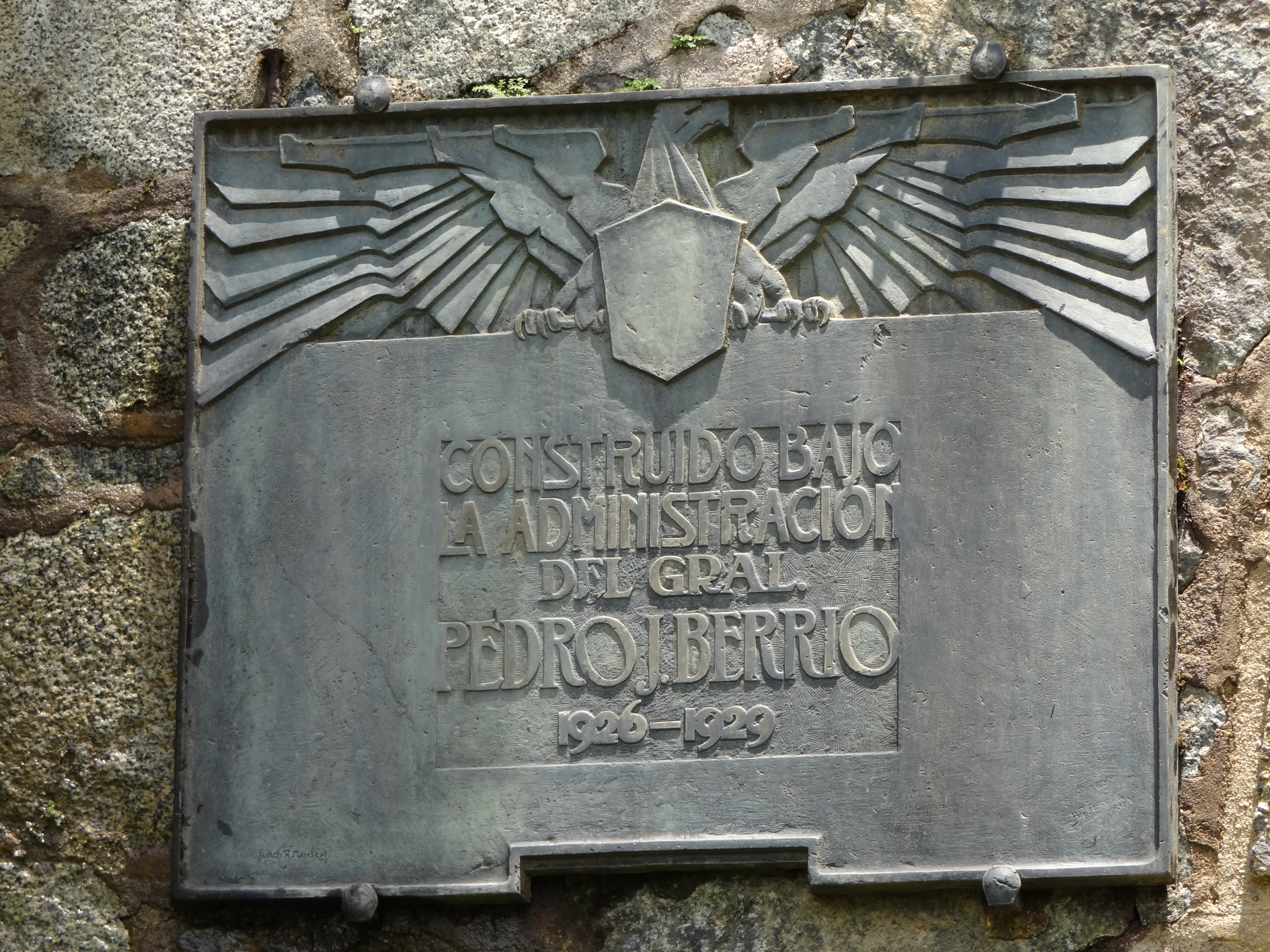
Plaque outside the La Quebrada Tunnel. It reads, "Constructed under the administration of Gov. Pedro Justo Berrío.

In the nineteenth century, Antioquia was then a sovereign state with six departments and its capital in Medellín when the plans began for a railway. The government started to consider building a railway along the Magdalena River starting in 1864. The Magdalena River was then an important hub for import and export of goods. In 1874 the official construction contract was signed. Cuban engineer Francisco Javier Cisnero was hired to finish the construction of the railway in eight years. The biggest challenge for the railway construction was that Antioquia was geographically too steep, and the construction of railways in such difficult territory represented a huge undertaking for the technology of the late nineteenth century. The plan was for a railway bordering the river to start in Puerto Berrío and end in the Barbosa district.

The first track was built in October 1875. The railroad was completed before the global economic crisis of 1929, which closed capital markets and foreign credit to works such as this one (see Colombian economy and politics 1929–58). This was one of the last public works that the country was able to finance by going to international capital markets in the twenties. It was therefore providential to have managed to finish the railroad in those days, because a further delay would probably have meant a delay of twenty or thirty years in its completion. The novel transport system eased the work required to move the crops, since the trade began to be made much more quickly and at substantially lower costs.

The railway initially spanned 58 kilometers, and then was expanded to 91 kilometers in length. By the end of its expansion, there were two main lines: the "Nus division" spanning 118 kilometers from Puerto Berrío to El Límon and the "Porce division" spanning 72 kilometers from Santiago to Medellín. Between El Límon and Santiago there was a geographical depression known as "The Break" (Spanish: La Quebrada).

=== Early obstacles ===
There were many obstacles to getting the railroad into operation. The idea of a railroad was not readily accepted by the public. Replacing the mules and mule drivers for an unfamiliar steel machine was difficult for many people, because the new technology would undoubtedly involve unknown risks. The skepticism was not unwarranted. For example, the Number One Locomotive serving Medellín was actually Number Two because the first one disappeared off the map after having fallen down an abyss. To avoid panic, the company painted the number "1" on the Number Two Locomotive, and this story was not communicated to the public until a hundred years later.

=== Thousand Days' War ===
The Thousand Days' War hurt the country and consequently the national railways, which had been developed simultaneously with Antioquia. Indeed, during this time the rail service in the country was suspended for three years, and because of the war they were destroyed, restored and then demolished, repeatedly over many seasons.

However, Antioquia, given its isolation from the rest of the country, was relatively peaceful during this period of war. And as a result, this area rebounded more quickly than the rest of the country after the war.

== Postwar decline ==
In 1903 Panama seceded from Colombia, and Colombia was compensated financially on 7 August 1922. The Central Bank was built from part of this money, but most of these funds were used to restore the railways since the time of the presidency of Rafael Reyes. However, the government gave priority to the construction of roads, especially since 1930. Since that time, investment in rail transport decreased by almost 90%.

In 1934, difficulties in the Antioquia Railway started with the first railroad union strike, which had 63 petitions. In 1947, came a second strike. Roads, initially built to support the train, slowly began to pose a threat to its survival.

=== Competition by roads ===
The railroad begins to face strong competition from other transport modes. The preponderance of roads between 1930 and 1950 generated strong competition among transport modes and a price war. The purchase by the Antioquia Railway in 1951 of two Austrian Diesel locomotives, which then it had to sell to the National Railways in 1956 created a debt of USD $26,580, which jeopardized the financial stability of the company. Another thrust that killed the train was the construction of the Puerto Berrio-Medellin pipeline, because oil was previously transported by train.

== End of the railway and beginning of IDEA ==
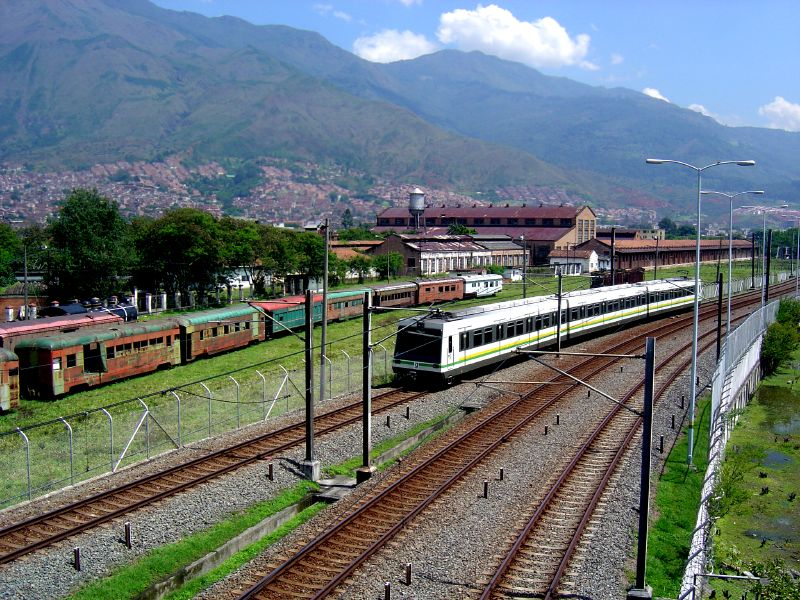
Medellín Metro alongside old trains belonging to the Antioquia Railway

Finally, the existence of the Antioquia Railway Company ended in 1961. By ordinance of 15 August 1961, Colombia approved the sale of the Antioquia Railway to the National Railway Company.

The money from this sale, fortunately, led to the birth of the Institute for the Development of Antioquia, which was born by Order No. 13 of 28 August 1964; their initial capital monies were selling the Antioquia Railway to the nation. Two years after the completion of the sale, the fate of these resources was a matter of debate for the Departmental Government, headed by Dr. Mario Restrepo Aramburo who, with other illustrious characters like Peter Santamaria Antioquia, Uribe Restrepo and Jorge Luis López de Mesa pushed for the initiative to establish the Institute for the Development of Antioquia (Spanish: Instituto para el Desarrollo de Antioquia [IDEA]). The entity has become a bastion of achievement for the department and much of the country. The IDEA is now architect of ambitious and gigantic development projects in Antioquia.

=== Aftermath ===
After the Antioquia Railway, the national railway company also began to decline. In 1988, by Act 21 there was the creation of the Empresa Colombiana de Ferrocarriles in order to upgrade and maintain roads and Societies Rail Transport (STF), which existed until 1999 and were in charge of managing the commercial train service; and finally the Social Fund liabilities National Railways which handled the pensions, benefits and allowances of workers.

To this day, most of the country does not have a railway system. Indeed, Colombia has a large network of 3,600 kilometers of railways with only a few functional kilometers belonging to the coal mines of El Cerrejón; the tourist train or railway Savannah Savannah, Turistren, which makes its way from Bogota to Zipaquirá with just 52 km travel and ranging to the Jaime Duque (Briceño) park in Caro; the railroad Bogota - Peace River (Boyacá), which corresponds to the Northeast Railway line by the national government to use cargo Pacific Railroad between Cali and Buenaventura; among others.

== Example of the effect of railway transportation ==
As an example of the effect of the railway, transporting a piano overland from Nare to Medellín lasted about 20 days and cost 265 gold pesos, while travel on rail lasted only one day and the cost was 8.4 gold pesos. In this regard indicates Gabriel Poveda: "Based on information in Antioquia and other parts of the country, PW Mac Greevy has calculated that the average freight bridle paths of Colombia in the period 1845-1880 was 41.6 cents per ton/kilometer. With the use of railways, the projected costs would be approximately 65% lower.

== Gallery ==
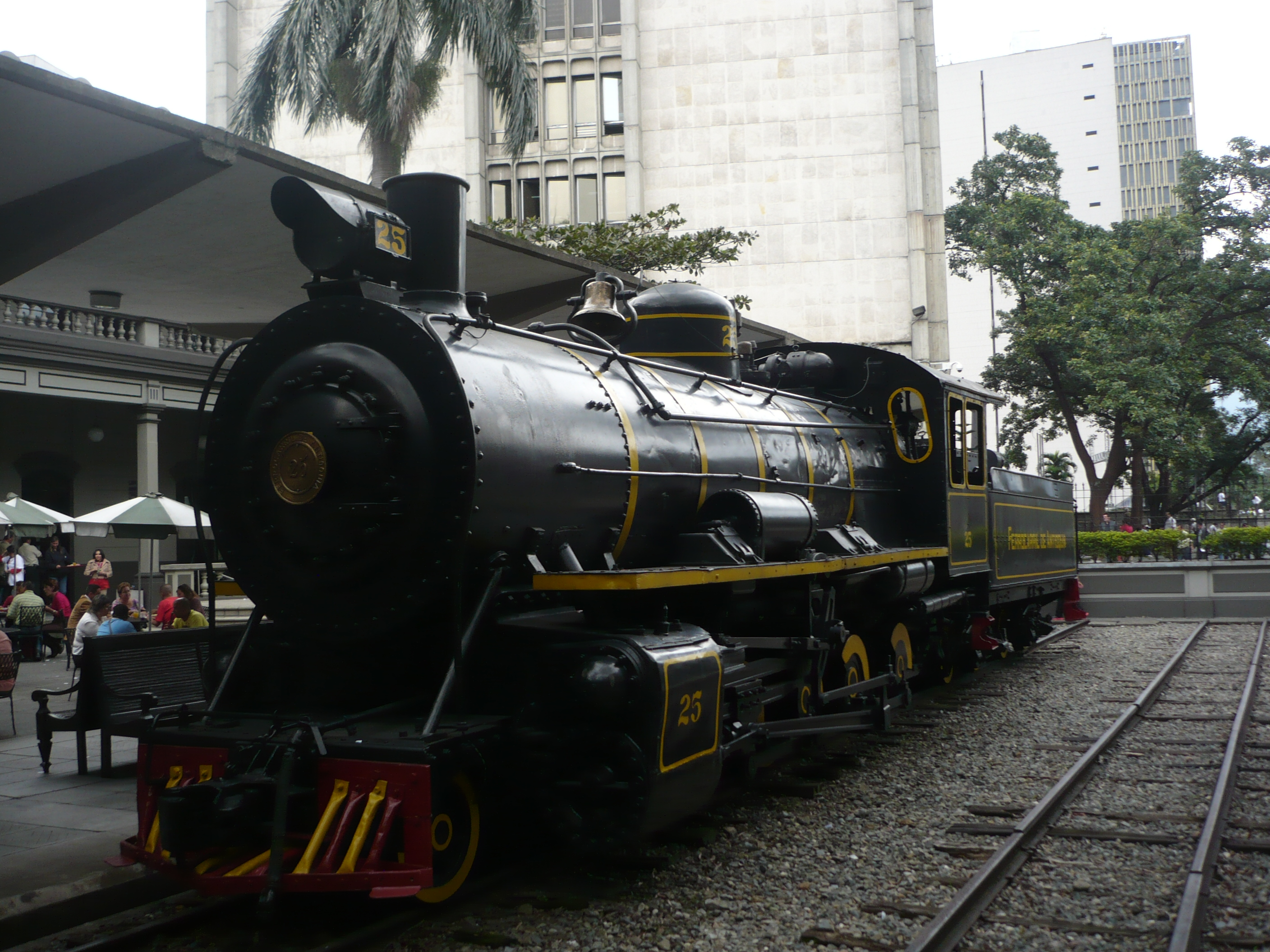
A preserved steam locomotive at the Medellín station

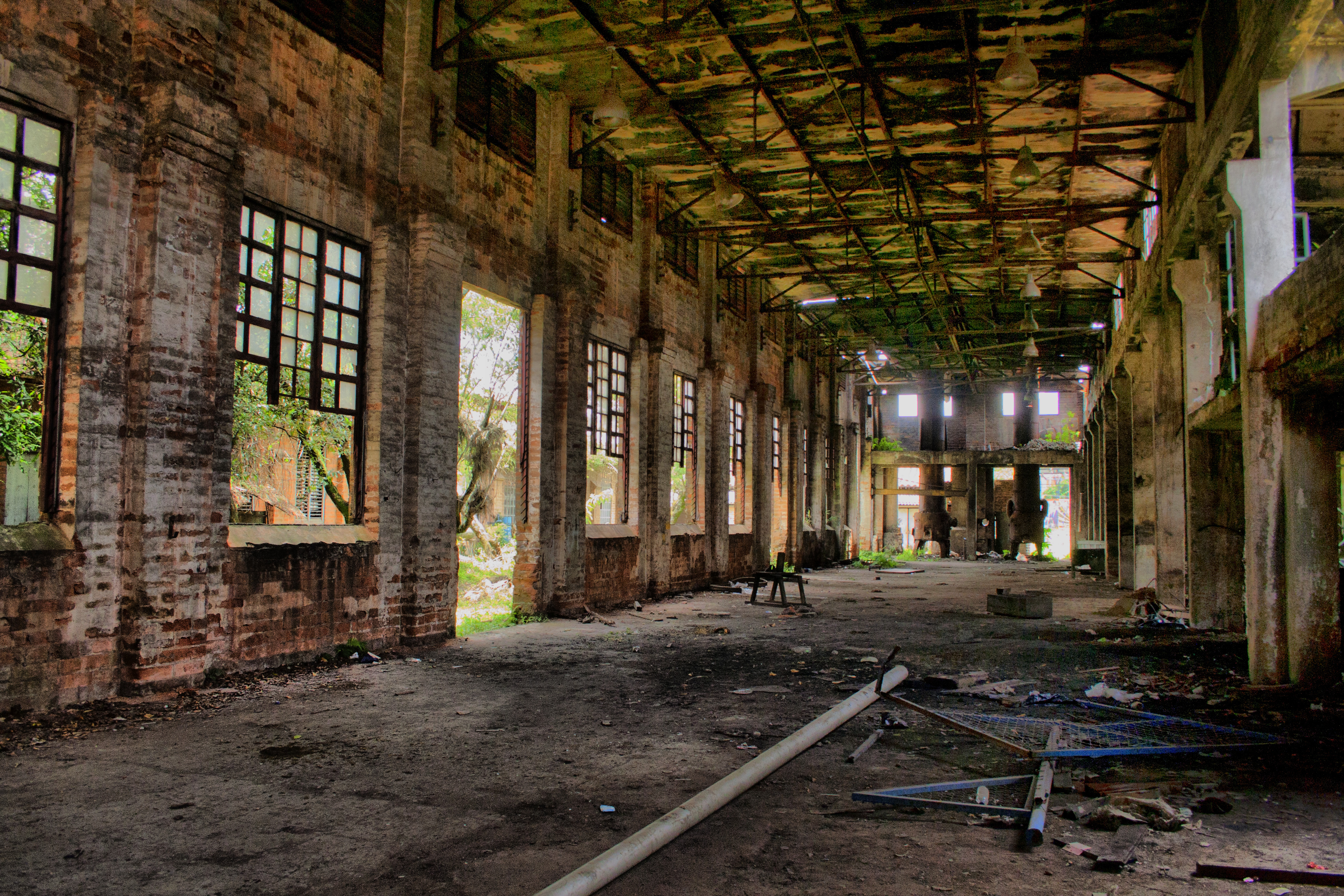
The abandoned remains from the Bello station

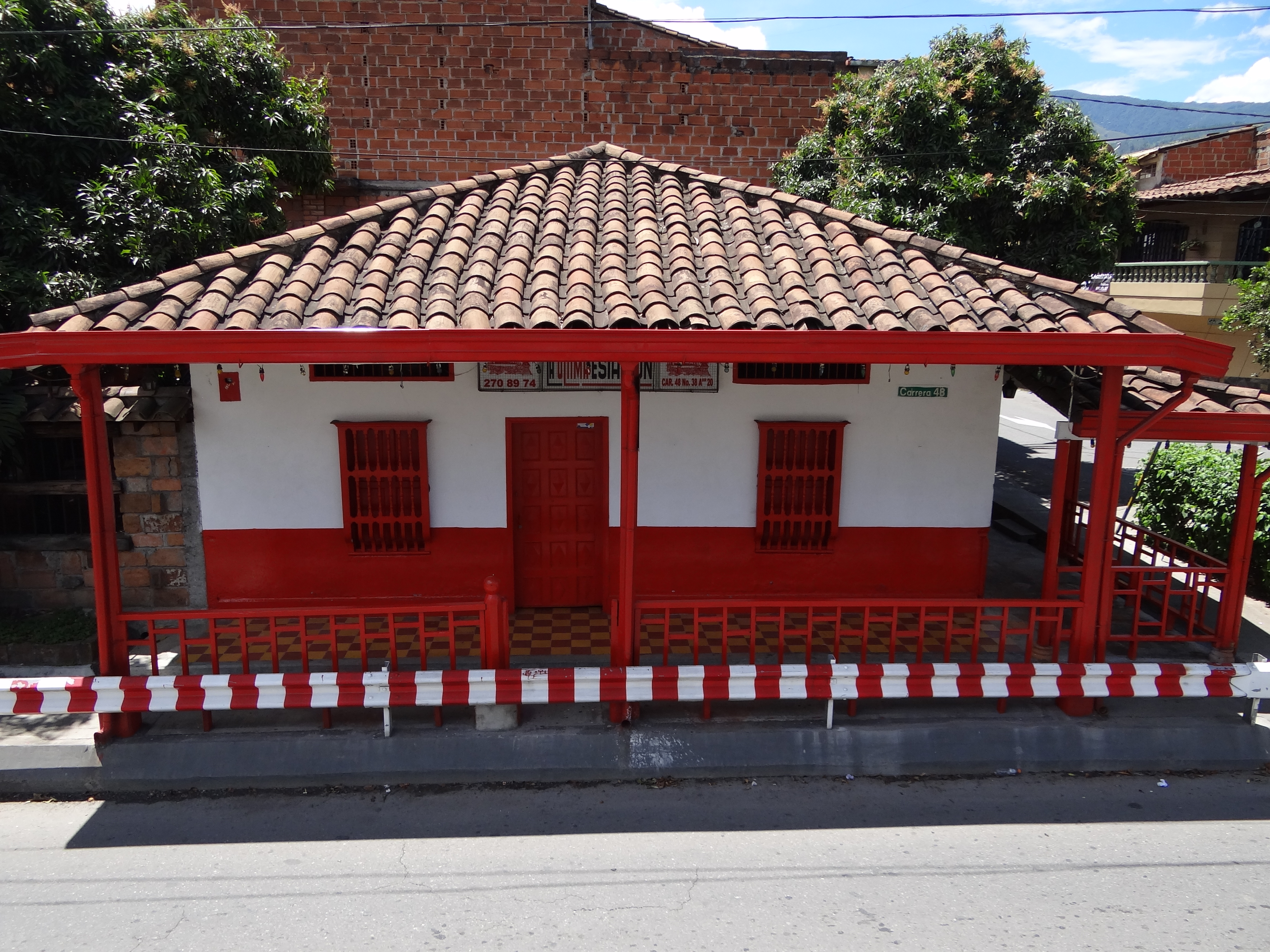
Envigado train station

== See also ==
- Rail transport in Colombia
