= Mexican heraldry =

Mexican heraldry mainly describes the emblems used by municipalities, but also personal heraldry, found in Mexico. Mexico has no heraldic authority, and since the end of the Second Mexican Empire, no nobility to grant or deny personal heraldry. The Mexican federal government, all Mexican states, Mexico City and many local municipalities have Coat of arms(Spanish: Escudo, lit. "shield"), and are regulated by legislative or executive statutes, not grants of arms.

The Coat of arms of Mexico, featuring the creation myth of Tenochtitlan (today Mexico City), also resembling seals of U.S. states.

The Coat of arms of Puebla featuring Mesoamerican Iconography chiefly two Feathered Serpents.

== Style ==
Most emblems were designed informally or in design competitions, and as such tend not to be cohesive

Mexican civic emblems have historically followed Spanish heraldic tradition, with many elements, chiefly the semicircular Iberian shield still common.

With Mexico embracing its Indigenous cultural wealth, many newer designs since the latter 20th century incorporate Mesoamerican Iconography. Aztec glyphs (either as charges on a bordered shield or standalone), Jaguar warriors, Feathered Serpents and a general illustration style mimicking Mesoamerican codices are all represented.

Another common motif are shields that are almost square, featuring a Bordure with text, and quartered, featuring motives of local Infrastructure, Industry, Agriculture and history.

Many coat of arms that predate Mexican Independence and those from its Imperial era featured crowns. However, these have either been completely omitted (as in the case of Mexico City) or replaced. Nowadays, municipal shields are commonly topped with helmets, but Feather and Mural crowns, as well as mountains and rising suns.

A major exception to these design trends is the Coat of arms of Mexico which resembles the Seals of the US states, and is as such more inline with the secular republican tradition.

== See also ==
- Mexican nobility
- Armorial of Mexico
- Mexican Academy of Genealogy and Heraldry
- Academia de Genealogía y Heráldica Mota-Padilla
