= Ricardo Lancaster-Jones y Verea =

Mexican diplomat and historian (1905–1983)

Ricardo Lancaster-Jones y Verea, MA BE KHS
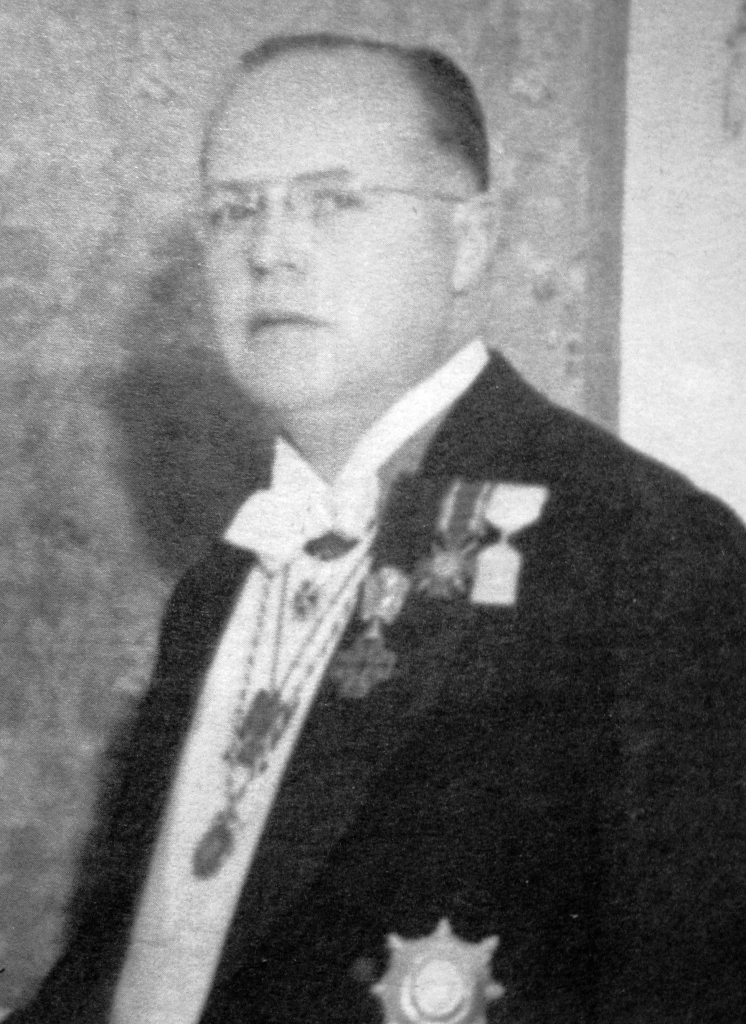
- Ricardo Lancaster-Jones y Verea, aged 48
- Born: 9 February 1905; Guadalajara, Jalisco, Mexico
- Died: 20 January 1983 (aged 77); Guadalajara, Jalisco
- Resting place: Guadalajara, Jalisco: Iglesia de Ntra. Sra. de La Paz
- Education: Jalisco (1928, topo. eng.); Ohio (1929, BE); Jalisco (1965, History); New Mexico (1973, MA)
- Occupations: Sugarcane entrepreneur, diplomat, journalist, academic, art collector and scholar
- Writing career
- Language: Spanish, English, French, Italian and Latin
- Genre: Prose
- Subject: History
- Notable works: El Acta de Francisco Márquez en Guadalajara (1947), Tríptico Mariano (1948), La Hacienda de Santa Ana Apacueco (1951), El Primer Mayorazgo Tapatío (1957), Primo de Verdad, Jalisciense Neto (1958), El Uso de Documentos en la Restauración de Edificios (1969), Haciendas de Jalisco y Aledaños (1506–1821) (1974)
- Notable awards: • 1951: Medalla de la República (Mexico) • 1952: Knight of the Equestrian Order of the Holy Sepulchre of Jerusalem (Holy See) • 1954: Red Cross Silver Medal (Japan) • 1956: José María Vigil award on literary merit by the Congress of the State of Jalisco (Mexico) • 1956: Medalla al Mérito Consular (Colombia) • 1956: Medalla de Compostela by the Congress of the State of Nayarit (Mexico) • 1956: Cross of Merit of the Equestrian Order of the Holy Sepulchre of Jerusalem (Holy See) • 1956: Gold Papal Lateran Cross (Holy See) • 1961: Gold Medal of the Columbus Association from UNESCO

Ricardo Lancaster-Jones y Verea, MA BE KHS (9 February 1905 – 20 January 1983) was a Mexican historian and scholar who made significant contributions toward the study of the haciendas of the State of Jalisco (Mexico) in the twentieth century. His enthusiasm for history led him to become a professor of Regional History at the Faculty of Philosophy and Letters of Universidad Autónoma de Guadalajara in 1965. Later on, in 1973, he earned his MA degree in Latin American Studies at the University of New Mexico.

== Biography ==
=== Family and early life ===
Ricardo Lancaster-Jones y Verea born in Guadalajara, Jalisco, to Alberto Lancaster-Jones y Mijares and Isabel Verea y Vallarta. His father, Alberto Lancaster-Jones y Mijares (1873–1958) was a British-Mexican sugarcane entrepreneur and scientist. His mother came from a family with a long tradition in the diplomatic service, politics, and the military.

Ricardo Lancaster-Jones y Verea's early life passed between Guadalajara, Mexico City (where his paternal grandfather lived) and his family's Hacienda of Santa Cruz y El Cortijo (located in Zapotiltic, Jalisco). When he turned 27 years old, he was asked to choose citizenship: he could have taken British nationality owing to his father's citizenship, but chose Mexican nationality.

=== Early studies and occupation ===
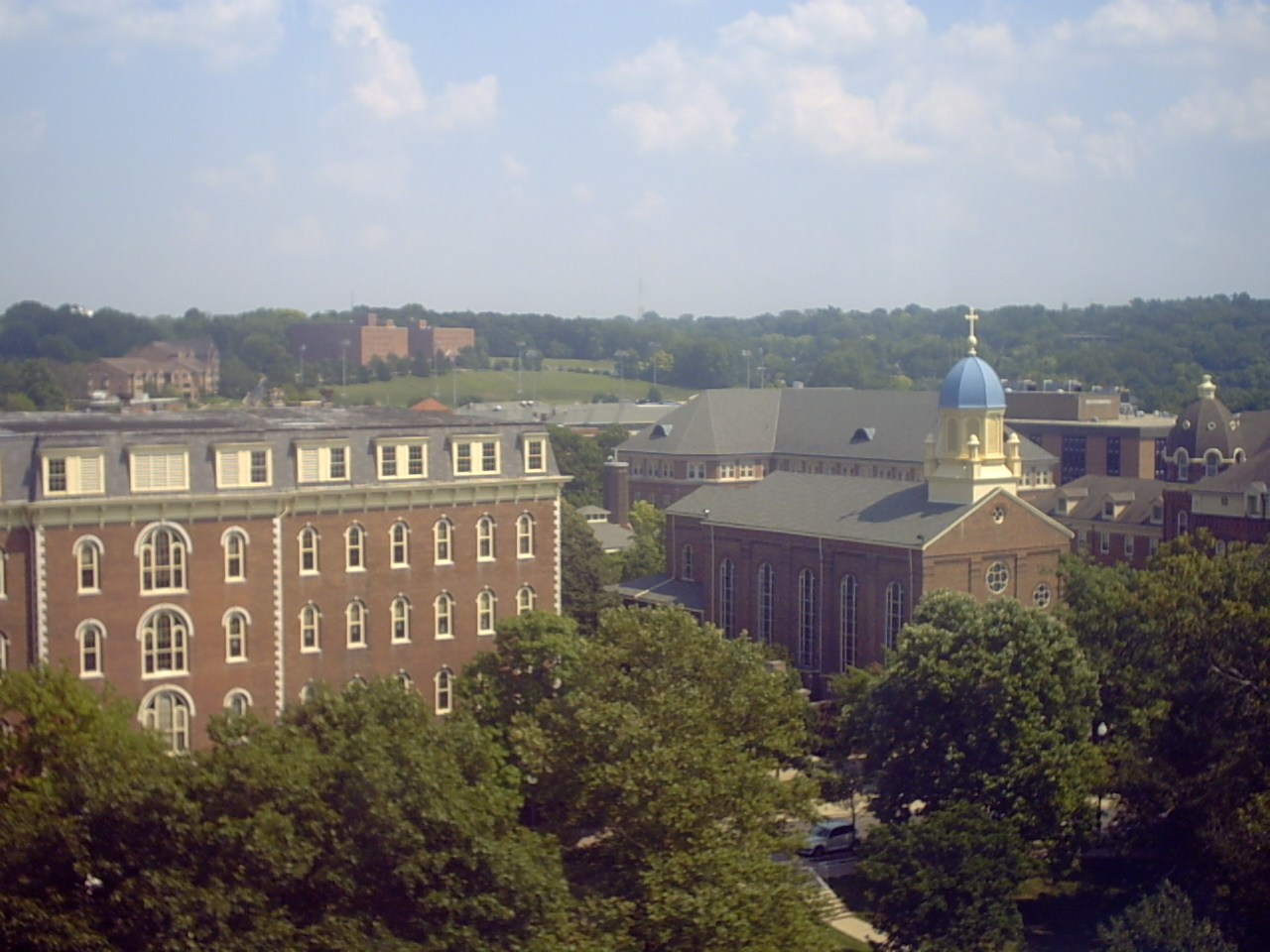
St. Mary's Hall and the Immaculate Conception Chapel at the University of Dayton.

Ricardo Lancaster-Jones y Verea studied in Mexico (Instituto de Ciencias and Escuela Libre de Ingenieros, both in Guadalajara), and in the United States (St Charles College, Grand Coteau, Louisiana and the University of Dayton, Ohio). He earned a Topographical Engineering degree at the Escuela Libre de Ingenieros de Jalisco (1928) and a Bachelor of Engineering (BE) degree at the University of Dayton (1929).

As the eldest child of his family, he entered the sugarcane business in 1930 at the already mentioned Ingenio Santa Cruz y El Cortijo, where he made important contributions until 1942. In 1944, he became a member of the board of directors of Ingenio Tamazula (a sugar refinery located in Tamazula de Gordiano, Jalisco). In 1946, he was founding member of Sociedad de Ingenieros y Arquitectos de Guadalajara (Engineers and Architects Society of Guadalajara) serving as general manager since 1949. Then, in 1950 he became a member of the board of directors of Banco Industrial de Jalisco.

=== Contributing journalist ===
Beginning in 1934, Lancaster-Jones wrote for the Gaceta de Guadalajara magazine, later becoming a contributing journalist for the El Informador newspaper. He continued writing for different magazines and newspapers from Guadalajara and Mexico City, such as Crónica Social Tapatía, El Mundo, Estudios Históricos, Excélsior, El Occidental, et al.

=== Marriage ===
In Guadalajara, on 28 October 1935, Ricardo Lancaster-Jones married Luz Padilla y España (5 April 1913 – 5 March 1978); the wedding reception was held at the Verea y Vallarta's mansion in Guadalajara (nowadays, this building is the seat of the Congress of Jalisco). On 18 February 1955, Luz Padilla y España was named Dame of the Equestrian Order of the Holy Sepulchre of Jerusalem.

Luz Padilla y España was the eldest child of Arcadio Padilla y Romo de Vivar, and of Guadalupe España y Araujo.

Arcadio Padilla y Romo de Vivar was a well-known Guadalajaran attorney-at-law who also was Mexico's National Railroads representative in Mexico City (1920–1935), and the State of Jalisco's Senior Deputy to Mexico's National Congress (1928–1930).

Guadalupe España y Araujo was granddaughter of José María Araujo, a Guadalajaran attorney-at-law, District Judge and Knight of the Imperial Order of Guadalupe (27 February 1865).

Through her extended family, Luz Padilla y España was niece of: A) Carmen Padilla y Romo de Vivar, wife of the Guadalajaran academic and painter José Vizcarra (1874–1956). B) Sara España y Araujo, wife of Alfredo Navarro Branca (1881–1979), a famous Guadalajaran architect from post-revolutionary period; nowadays, among his buildings, that of the Universidad de Guadalajara (1914) stands out.

== Diplomat ==
During the course of his life, Lancaster-Jones participated in some diplomatic activities with the United States, El Salvador, the United Nations and the Holy See:

=== Consulate of the United States ===
The city of Downey, California became a Sister city of Guadalajara in 1960 during Ricardo Lancaster-Jones y Verea's presidency of the Asociación Consular de Guadalajara.

- 1945: he was appointed as Advisor for Cultural Affairs to the United States consulate in Guadalajara.

=== Consulate of El Salvador ===
- 1946: he was appointed as Consul of the Republic of El Salvador (1946–69) in Guadalajara.

=== United Nations Delegate ===
- 1950: he was named as United Nations' Delegate to the State of Jalisco. From 1953 to 1960, he was Secretary General of its Regional Committee.

=== Order of the Holy Sepulchre ===
- 1950–52: he organized, along with Cardinal Jose Garibi y Rivera, the Nueva Galicia's Chapter (Intendencia de Nueva Galicia) of the Equestrian Order of the Holy Sepulchre of Jerusalem and served as its first General Secretary since 1952.

=== Asociación Consular de Guadalajara ===
- 1950: he was co-founder and third President (1958–66) of the Asociación Consular de Guadalajara (Consular Association of Guadalajara). During his presidency the city of Guadalajara became a sister city of Downey, California on 26 August 1960. The following year, he was named vice-president of the first Reunión Nacional de Cónsules, celebrated 18–20 November 1961, Veracruz, México.

== Historian ==
Lancaster-Jones was included by Luis González y González among the notable historians of the second half of the 20th century in Mexico (1973).

In 1954, Lancaster-Jones gave more than a dozen photos to Paul Alexander Bartlett, depicting the haciendas Santa Cruz and El Cortijo (Jalisco) from 1880 to 1940, contributing to Bartlett's large-scale study of more than 350 haciendas throughout Mexico that Bartlett conducted between 1943 and 1985. Nowadays, these photographs are kept in the Benson Latin American Collection at the University of Texas at Austin.

=== Museo Regional de Guadalajara ===
In 1952 the Governor of the State of Jalisco, José Jesús González Gallo (1900–1957), appointed Lancaster-Jones as Curator of the Museo Regional de Guadalajara, serving this post until 31 December 1953. During the two years he was in office, he reorganized the exhibition rooms, commanded the restoration of priceless works of art, and made a detailed inventory of the various museum collections.

In 1949 he founded – along with Salvador Gutiérrez Contreras – the Sociedad de Amigos de Compostela and was its General Secretary. In 1953 he established the Sociedad Oaxaqueña de Genealogía y Heráldica, being its Honorary President. In 1955 he established the Sociedad de Amigos de Tecolotlán, being its General Secretary.

=== Academia Mexicana de Genealogía y Heráldica ===
- 1948: He entered to the Academia Mexicana de Genealogía y Heráldica as a supernumerary. Since then, most of his essays on genealogy and heraldry were published in the Academia's Memorias; among others, La Familia Añorga y sus ramas de México (1949) stands out due to the extensive iconographic research on the families: Añorga, Barron, Escandón and Mijares. This study provide new facts to Captain José de Añorga's biography: he was the first Director of San Blas' shipyards, and the Port's Governor; this place became very important because the New Spain's explorations to North America's Pacific Coast departed from there.
- 1954: He became a numerary member with seat #21 and was appointed by Academia's president, José Ignacio Dávila Garibi, as Academia's Delegate to the State of Jalisco.

=== Academia de Genealogía y Heráldica Mota-Padilla ===
...other Mexicans have distinguished, like Ricardo Lancaster-Jones y Verea, of Guadalajara, for keeping alive the Academia de Genealogía y Heráldica Mota-Padilla in the city of his residence; an attempted that was imitated without much success by some enthusiasts from the cities Oaxaca and Merida.

— Ramiro Ordoñez Jonama (1995).
- 1950–53: He reorganized the Academia de Genealogía y Heráldica Mota-Padilla, being its President (1950–83). He has been praised by the academic Ramiro Ordoñez Jonama (former Vice Minister of Foreign Affairs of Guatemala) regarding his work by giving continuity to this institution.

=== Sociedad Mexicana de Geografía y Estadística ===
- 1950–57: He was General Secretary of the Junta Auxiliar Jalisciense (Jalisco's Chapter) of the Sociedad Mexicana de Geografía y Estadística.

=== Universidad Autónoma de Guadalajara ===
In 1965 Antonio Leaño Álvarez del Castillo (1913–2010), Rector and Chairman of the Board of Universidad Autónoma de Guadalajara, appointed Ricardo Lancaster-Jones as professor of regional history at the Faculty of Philosophy and Letters.

=== University of New Mexico ===
In 1973 Lancaster-Jones earned his M.A. in Latin American Studies at University of New Mexico with the thesis Haciendas de Jalisco y aledaños: fincas rústicas de antaño, 1506–1821 (published in Mexico the next year as Haciendas de Jalisco y Aledaños (1506-1821)). Then, he continued with the PhD studies under the guidance of Donald C. Cutter (1922–2014), emeritus professor of history at University of New Mexico from 1976 until 1978, then, his health broke down. After he recovered his health in late 1978, he didn't continued with the PhD degree for personal reasons.

=== Disciples ===
Another noted disciple of Lancaster-Jones was Áurea Zafra Oropeza (died 11 August 2010, Guadalajara), among whose publications are Agustín Rivera y Agustín de la Rosa ante la filosofía novohispana (Sociedad Jalisciense de Filosofía, Guadalajara, 1994) and Las cofradías de Cocula (Agata, Guadalajara, 1996). Her La mujer en la historia de Jalisco was awarded in 1996 by the Government of the State of Jalisco.

== Connoisseur ==
According to Leopoldo I. Orendain (1898–1972), Ricardo Lancaster-Jones y Verea was a "real Connoisseur" whose enthusiasm as an art collector brought him to become advisor to several governors of Jalisco and various businessmen who sought for his help during the formation of their own collections of art. He was also a referee in testamentary appraisals. Lancaster-Jones was the first person, since 1948, to question the authenticity of a group of six paintings elaborated on copper sheet, attributed to Rubens and that are in the collection of the Basilica of Our Lady of San Juan de los Lagos (Jalisco).

José Cornejo Franco (1900–1977), Director of the Public Library of the State of Jalisco (1949–1977), avers that Lancaster-Jones collaborated with the formation of several private libraries and contributed with the reorganization of the Public Library of the State of Jalisco (1950–1959). In 1970 the restoration of the former Franciscan convent of Guadalajara owed to his work El Uso de Documentos en la Restauración de Edificios Antiguos (Use of Documents in the Restoration of old Buildings). This study was published the year before (1969), through it, he examines an inventory from 1718 of the same Franciscan convent (a manuscript of his own collection). Anticipating to his times as thirty years had to pass and so in the year 2000, the Escuela de Conservación y Restauración de Occidente (School of Conservation and Restoration of the West) was founded in Guadalajara.

=== Art collector ===
When Ricardo Lancaster-Jones y Verea's paternal grandfather died in 1922, he inherited an important collection of Mexican Colonial Art (pieces from the Viceroyalty of New Spain period), a collection which was increased through time with more pieces from the Colonial period as well as from Mexican 19th century. His art collection also included some selected pieces from 20th century's artists like Chucho Reyes (1880–1977), José Clemente Orozco (1883–1949) and Jorge González Camarena (1908–1980). He is mentioned among the most important art collectors in the State of Jalisco by Xavier Torres Ladrón de Guevara (1997).

Guadalajaran art collector Carlos Navarro gives remarkable importance to his oil painting portrait collection in his book El Retrato en Jalisco (2004). This collection included works from artists like: José María Estrada (1764–1860), Juan Cordero (1822–1884), Pablo Valdéz (1839–1898), Felipe Castro (1832–1902), Jacobo Gálvez (1821–1882), Gerardo Suárez (1834–1870), José Pamplona (1845–1867), Carlos Villaseñor (1849–1920) and José Vizcarra (1874–1956).

=== Booklover ===
Lancaster-Jones is mentioned by Ramiro Villaseñor y Villaseñor as one of the notable booklovers of Jalisco. His library had more than 35,000 volumes, most of them collected through the course of his life. Nowadays, those volumes are distributed among the libraries of El Colegio de Jalisco, the University of Texas and the University of New Mexico, as well as in private collections in Mexico and abroad.

=== Ex Libris ===
His bookplate was catalogued in 1970 by the Mexican academic José Miguel Quintana (1908–1987) in Libros Mexicanos; it was designed by the artist and academic Carlos Stahl (1892–1984). Nowadays, one of Ricardo Lancaster-Jones' bookplates can be found at the Colección de ex-libris de Guillermo Tovar de Teresa (Guillermo Tovar de Teresa's Bookplates Collection) at the Universidad Iberoamericana in Mexico City.

=== Sociedad de Anticuarios de Guadalajara ===
In 1953 Lancaster-Jones established the Sociedad de Anticuarios de Guadalajara (Society of Antiquarians of Guadalajara), serving as General Secretary from 1953 to 1980.

== Honours and awards ==
=== Honours ===
1952	Holy See	Knight of the Order of the Holy Sepulchre
1954	England	PhD Honoris Causa by the University College London
1956	England	D.Litt. Honoris Causa by the Ministerial Training College (Sheffield)
1956	Cuba	D.Litt. Honoris Causa by the Colegio Universitario de San Andrés, (Havana)
1963	United States	Honorary citizen of New Orleans, Louisiana

=== Awards ===
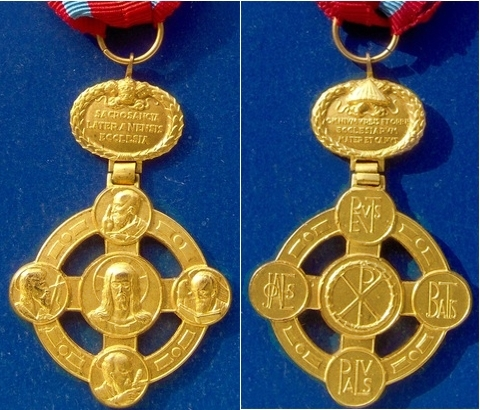
Papal Lateran Cross.

1948	Mexico	Medalla del Comité Geográfico Nacional
1951	Mexico	Medalla de la República
1953	Mexico	1st Class Cross and Badge General Ignacio Comonfort
1953	Mexico	Honorary Cross of the Society of Veterans from Servicio Militar Nacional de 1942
1954	Japan	Japanese Red Cross Society's Silver Medal
1955	Mexico	Medal of Honour of the Honorable Cuerpo de Defensores de la República Mexicana y sus Descendientes
1956	Holy See	Cross of Merit of the Equestrian Order of the Holy Sepulchre of Jerusalem
1956	Holy See	Papal Lateran Cross
1956	Mexico	José María Vigil award on literary merit by the Congress of the State of Jalisco, Mexico
1956	Mexico	Medalla de Compostela by the Congress of the State of Nayarit
1956	Colombia	Medalla al Mérito Consular by the Instituto Consular Interamericano
1958	Mexico	Academic Palms of the Sociedad Mexicana de Estudios Militares
1958	Panama	Cross of the Fundación Internacional Eloy Alfaro
1961	UNESCO	Gold Medal of the Columbus Association
1965	Spain	Henry Dunant Medal of the Spanish Red Cross Association
1965	Colombia	Officer on Consular Merit by the Instituto Consular Interamericano

== Major works ==
Ricardo Lancaster-Jones y Verea is mentioned by Heriberto García Rivas (1971) among the notable authors of the late 20th century in Mexico. As a published author, his name can be found also like: Ricardo Lancaster-Jones or Ing. Ricardo Lancaster-Jones.

== Main references ==
- Agraz García de Alba, Gabriel (1984). Evocación de Ricardo Lancaster-Jones y Verea. Mexico City: Academia Mexicana de Genealogía y Heráldica.
- Cabrera Ypiña de Corsi, Matilde (1970). Refutación genealógica del libro El Valle del Maíz, S.L.P. Mexico City: Academia Mexicana de Genealogía y Heráldica, pp. 11-46.
- Lajoie, Lucien F. (1972). Who's Notable in Mexico. Who's Who in Mexico, No.1. Mexico City: Who's Who in Mexico, pp. 124-125.
- León de la Barra, Luis (1957). Ordenes y Honores Pontificios en México. Mexico City: Academia Mexicana de Genealogía y Heráldica, pp. 12, 26, 102.
- Romero de Terreros, Manuel (1956). Antiguas Haciendas de México. Mexico City: Editorial Patria, pp. 12, 89-96.
- Sandoval Godoy, Luis (1983). Estudios Históricos. Vol. 26. Guadalajara: Centro de Estudios Históricos Fray Antonio Tello, pp. 54-56.
- Utah Genealogical Association (1971). "Genealogical Journal". Vol. 15-17. Salt Lake City: Utah Genealogical Association, pp. 160-170.
- Valk, Barbara G. (1982). HAPI thesaurus and name authority, 1975-1979. Los Angeles: UCLA Latin American Center Publications, p. 100.
- Vázquez-Tagle, José Jorge (1988). Class magazine. Vol. 5. Mexico City: Class, pp. 10-12.
- Villaseñor y Villaseñor, Ramiro (1986). Las Calles Históricas de Guadalajara. Las Calles Históricas de Guadalajara, No.3. Guadalajara: Gobierno de Jalisco, pp. 29-30.
- Villaseñor y Villaseñor, Ramiro (1990). Bibliografía General de Jalisco. Bibliografía General de Jalisco, No.3. Guadalajara: Gobierno de Jalisco, pp. 37-40.
