= Fortino Jaime =

Mexican publisher

- Born: Ixtlán del Río, Nayarit or Hostotipaquillo, Jalisco
- Died: 12 February 1951; Guadalajara, Jalisco, Mexico
- Other name: Don Fortis
- Years active: 1917–1951

Fortino Jaime Ibarra (Ixtlán del Río, Nayarit or Hostotipaquillo, Jalisco, 1881 or 1883 - Guadalajara, Jalisco, 12 February 1951), was a Mexican publisher, literary promoter, printer, bookbinder and bookseller.

== Biography ==
His parents were Pablo Jaime and Basilia Ibarra. He studied Elementary School in Hostotipaquillo. Later moved to Guadalajara to continue his studies, and in 1897, when he was 14 or 15 years old, he was already one of the most distinguished students of the Conciliar Seminary of Guadalajara, where he obtained the highest marks and medals of honor in Grammar, Latin and French.

In 1900 he left his studies at the seminary and immediately established a stationery business that was attended by his sisters Daría and Rafaela. In 1911 he made himself known as a publisher with a reissue of the Memorias de Don Sebastián Lerdo de Tejada, written by the journalist Adolfo R. Carrillo in San Francisco, California. The following year he associated with a friend named Padilla and two years later they published the newspaper El Vacilón (The Joker). The first issue of this publication came to light on 6 December 1914. However, it was not successful and soon ceased to be published, at the same time as the "Jaime y Padilla" society disintegrated.

In 1915, Fortino associated with Aurelio Cortés, a merchant of the Guadalajara downtown Mercado Corona, with whom he established a grocery store and miscellany located on Calle Corona, an establishment that burned down.

== His "literary salon" ==
Aurelio Cortés and he re-installed their store under the name "Árbol de Navidad" ("Christmas Tree"). Their business was located at Juárez and Corona, a place that was known in Guadalajara for its wide assortment and for the care and attention by its owners. Some Guadalajaran personalities used to pay visits to the concern; amongst them were the following: politician Manuel Martínez Valadez, painter Ixca Farías, Carlos Gutiérrez Cruz, author Agustín Basave y del Castillo Negrete; priests De la Cueva, Amando J. De Alba and Severo Díaz Galindo used to go to that store; José Cornejo Franco, poet Enrique González Martínez, novelist Agustín Yáñez, Adrián Puga, Alfonso Manuel Castañeda; Enrique Díaz de León, first rector of the University of Guadalajara, in 1925–1926; Francisco Ayón Ceballos, Agustín Bancalari and Jorge Bartolomé y Campos.

== Fortino, a publisher ==
In addition to attending his commercial concern, Fortino, a.k.a. «Don Fortis», served as a counselor to the Guadalajara National Chamber of Commerce in 1916. By 1918, when the partnership with Cortés had disintegrated, Fortino Jaime transferred his "Árbol de Navidad" to Avenida 16 de Septiembre #238. Active and dynamic, he never neglected his editorial duties. On 4 November 1918, he finished the printing of the first issue of the Revista Azul, Magazine Miniatura del Hogar (Blue Magazine, Miniature Magazine for the Home), whose edition and publishing continued until 1920, and whose collection today is appraised at high prices. Another treasure in that year was el Libro de Ensayos Críticos (Book of Critical Essays), by Agustín Basave y del Castillo Negrete.

In 1918, he installed a printing shop and a bookbinding table at the back of his store, where publications such as Anáhuac, Misterios del Corazón (Mysteries of the Heart), El alma de las cosas (The Soul of Things), by Amando J. De Alba; El hombre y la Arquitectura (Man and Architecture), by Agustín Basave; and Memorias Tapatías, by José Ignacio Dávila Garibi were published. Likewise, a series of legal publications such as the Código de Procedimientos Civiles del Estado de Jalisco (Code of Civil Procedures of the State of Jalisco), la Ley de Hacienda del Estado (Law of State Finance), y la Ley Agraria (Agrarian Law), among others, were edited by the Fortino Jaime press. In 1919 from the presses of Fortino Jaime came a book written by the gentle and cordial Marquis of San Francisco, Manuel Romero de Terreros: Bocetos de la vida social en la Nueva España (Sketches of Social Life in New Spain). By 1928, the Fortino Jaime printing house, "Árbol de Navidad" (Christmas Tree), changed location again: it was located at Calle Morelos 487, where two other precious and enlightened writers began to attend: Adalberto Navarro Sánchez and Ramiro Villaseñor y Villaseñor. Almost at the end of 1947 the store moved to its last residence: an old house at the corner of 151 Belén and Juan Manuel Streets, in Guadalajara.

== Fortino Jaime, as seen by Emmanuel Carballo ==
Between 1917 and 1937, Fortino Jaime was a publisher in Guadalajara, and his bookstore, one with a good assortment in that city. Literary critic Emmanuel Carballo (1929-2014) points out that he met Fortino in 1944, when he (Carballo) used to go to the bookstore, located at Morelos 487 (in Guadalajara) to buy used books, and perceived him as a decrepit man, in a "rat's nest", where Fortino argued a lot with his clients about book prices, like an usurer. Carballo indicates that this was, as he read in the book Asuntos Tapatíos (Tapatios Affairs), by Francisco Ayón Zéster, due to loneliness and abandonment by public officials, writers, politicians, scientists... He became a misanthrope. Fortino Jaime was a great promoter of Jalisco culture.

== Resting place ==
His remains rest at the Panteón de Mezquitán (Mezquitan Cemetery), in Guadalajara. On 24 April 1991, the mayor of Guadalajara Gabriel Covarrubias Ibarra, in recognition of the editorial work of Fortino Jaime, approved the proposal to impose his name on the XXIII Feria Municipal del Libro y la Cultura de Guadalajara (23rd Municipal Book and Culture Fair of Guadalajara). The opinion of the Council was unanimously approved and among other considerations it mentioned: "Fortino Jaime Ibarra dedicated his whole life to promoting culture by offering the public innumerable texts at affordable prices."

== See also ==
- David Huerta
- Enrique Krauze
- Luis Abadiano
