= Academia de Genealogía y Heráldica Mota-Padilla =

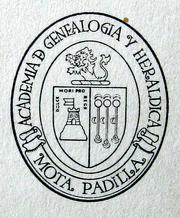
- Established: 12 January 1920
- Location: Guadalajara, Mexico

The Academia de Genealogía y Heráldica Mota-Padilla (Academy of Genealogy and Heraldry Mota-Padilla) was a cultural institution based in Guadalajara, Jalisco, the second largest city in Mexico. According with an article published in the Genealogical Journal (1971), this institution was the first genealogical association in Latin America.

== History ==
It was established on 12 January 1920 by Salvador Mota-Velasco y Abad (1855–1923); it was erected in memory of the first Historian of the former Kingdom of Nueva Galicia (New Galicia) in the Viceroyalty of New Spain, Matías Angel de la Mota Padilla (1688–1766), author of Historia de la Conquista del Reino de la Nueva Galicia (1741); among its members, the very same Salvador Mota-Velasco y Abad was a direct descendant of the after mentioned author. This institution was privately funded and led by enthusiasts of the Genealogical and Heraldic Sciences whose main purpose was to promote the creation of a study about the history of the municipality of Unión de Tula, Jalisco, with a genealogical and heraldic research of the four founding families of that place, which were the Topete, the Villaseñor, the Lazcano and the Arriola families (the name of the place was originated through their initials: T V L A). With the passing of time, the Academia's objectives went beyond the original idea, promoting any kind of Genealogical and Heraldic studies, then, more enthusiasts became members of this institution. They gathered monthly and produced some interesting works, like those published by journalist Alberto Santoscoy or by historian José R. Benítez; unfortunately, some of those papers are still unpublished.

=== Founding members ===
The founding members were five: Salvador Mota-Velasco y Abad (1855–1923), José Ignacio Dávila Garibi (1888–1981), Jorge Verea y Vallarta (1877–1958), Enrique Eduardo López Maldonado († 1938), and Alberto Santoscoy (1857–1906).

=== Academia's structure in 1920 ===
Board of Directors

- José Francisco Orozco y Jiménez, Honorary President
- Salvador Mota-Velasco y Abad, President
- Enrique Eduardo López Maldonado, Vice President
- José Ignacio Dávila Garibi, General Secretary
- Jorge Verea y Vallarta, 2nd Secretary & Treasurer

Founders Academicians in 1920

(alphabetical order)

- José Ascenio Zavala
- José R. Benítez
- Cesáreo L. González
- Francisco Medina de la Torre
- Leopoldo I. Orendain
- Luis Robles Martínez
- Alberto Santoscoy
- José Villa Gordoa
- José Villaseñor Plancarte

== Reorganization ==
After most of its original members died, the institution became less active; then, Jorge Verea y Vallarta's nephew, Ricardo Lancaster-Jones y Verea, reorganized it between 1950 and 1953, it was formally re-established with an act dated on 8 May 1953. After Lancaster-Jones y Verea's death in 1983, the institution became extinct.

=== Presidents ===
President	Served
Salvador Mota-Velasco y Abad (1855–1923)	1920–1923
Enrique Eduardo López Maldonado († 1938)	1923–1938
Jorge Verea y Vallarta (1877–1958)	1938–1949
Ricardo Lancaster-Jones y Verea (1905–83)	1950–1983

=== Academia's structure after 1950 ===
Board of Directors:

- José Ignacio Dávila Garibi, Honorary President
- Luis León de la Barra y García-Abello, Honorary Vice President
- Ricardo Lancaster-Jones y Verea, President
- Jesús Garibi Velasco, Vice President & General Secretary
- Leopoldo I. Orendain, Treasurer
- Carlos Stahl, Vice Treasurer

Honorary Academicians:

- Cardinal Jose Garibi y Rivera, Primate of Mexico and Archbishop of Guadalajara
- Cardinal József Mindszenty, Primate of Hungary and Archbishop of Budapest
- Cardinal Manuel Arteaga y Betancourt, Primate of Cuba and Archbishop of Havana
- Archduke Eugen of Austria
- Archduke Joseph of Austria
- Jacobo Fitz-James Stuart, 17th Duke of Alba and Berwick, Grandee of Spain

Counsultant Academicians:

- Alfonso Reyes, Literature
- Juan B. Iguíniz, Bibliography
- Ignacio Bernal, History
- José R. Benítez, History
- Lucas de Palacio, Heraldry
- Priest Alfredo Ochoa, Religious Heraldry
- Col. Rafael F. Muñoz, Military Heraldry
- Vicente de Cadenas y Vicent, Spanish Genealogy & Heraldry
- Faustino Menéndez Pidal de Navascués, Spanish History
- Juan de Adarraga, Etymology & Linguistics
- Gabriel García-Rojas y Pérez de Salazar, Law & Legal Affairs
- Antonio Pérez-Verdía y Fernández, Law & Legal Affairs
- Manuel Sandoval Vallarta, Government & International Affairs
- Daniel Escalante, Protocol

Patrons:

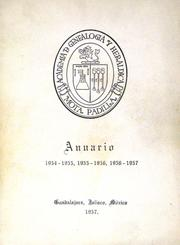
1957

Companies:

- Banco Industrial de Jalisco
- Banco Refaccionario de Jalisco
- Ingenio San Francisco de Ameca
- Ingenio Santa Cruz y El Cortijo
- Ingenio Tamazula

Individuals:

- Miguel Alfaro
- Félix Díaz Garza
- Xavier García de Quevedo y Castaños
- Aurelio González de Hermosillo y Brizuela
- José López-Portillo y Romo de Vivar

== Publications ==
The Academia de Genealogía y Heráldica Mota-Padilla published three volumes of Anuario (1943, 1955, 1957) and a Lista de Miembros y Estatutos (1955).

== Archdiocese of Guadalajara's genealogical records ==
This institution contributed with the Church of Jesus Christ of Latter-day Saints and with the Academia Mexicana de Genealogía y Heráldica, during the microfilming process of the complete and well preserved Archdiocese of Guadalajara's records (1953–71). Nowadays, a copy of these microfilms are located in the Archivo General de la Nación in Mexico City, and are available for public consultation under the guidelines and regulations of the same institution.

== Main references ==
- Academia de Genealogía y Heráldica Mota-Padilla (1955). Anuario. 1953-54. Guadalajara (Jalisco, Mexico): Academia de Genealogía y Heráldica Mota-Padilla, pp. 6-7.
- Academia de Genealogía y Heráldica Mota-Padilla (1955). Lista de Miembros y Estatutos. Guadalajara (Jalisco, Mexico): Academia de Genealogía y Heráldica Mota-Padilla, XVIII pp.
- Augustan Society (1975). The Augustan. Vol. 17-20. Orlando: Augustan Society, pp. 91, 93 y 104.
- Enciclopedia de México (1978). Enciclopedia de México. Vol. 5. Mexico City: Enciclopedia de México, pp. 256-257.
- Federação dos Institutos Genealógicos Latinos (1956). Revista Genealógica Latina. Vol. 8-10. São Paulo: Federação dos Institutos Genealógicos Latinos, pp. 244-245 y 270.
- Ramiro Ordoñez Jonama (1995). Panorama Actual de los Estudios Genealógicos en Mesoamérica. Numbers 250-251. Madrid: Hidalguía, p. 456.
- Utah Genealogical Association (1971). Genealogical Journal. Vol. 15-17. Salt Lake City: Utah Genealogical Association, pp. 160-170.
