= Encarnación =

Encarnación means incarnation in Spanish. Encarnación may also refer to:

== People ==
=== Given name ===
- Encarnación Alzona (1895–2001), Filipino historian, academic and suffragist
- Encarnación Bustillo Salomón (1876 – c. 1960), Spanish painter
- Encarnación Cabré (1911–2005), Spanish archaeologist
- Encarnación Duchi (born 1977), Ecuadorian politician
- Encarnación Ezcurra (1795–1838), Argentine activist and wife of Juan Manuel de Rosas
- Encarnación Fuyola (1907–1982), Spanish activist and educator
- Encarnación García Bonilla (born 1979), Spanish volleyball player
- Encarna Granados (born 1972), Spanish race walker
- Encarnación Magaña (1921–1942), Spanish anarchist and feminist
- Encarnación Padilla de Armas (1909–1992), American activist
- Jose Encarnacion Peña (1902–1979), also known as Soqween, Puebloan painter
- Encarnación Redondo Jiménez (born 1944), Spanish politician

=== Surname ===
- Alba Encarnación (1956–2012), Puerto Rican activist and educator
- Angelo Encarnación (born 1969), Dominican baseball player
- Christian Encarnacion-Strand (born 1999), American baseball player
- Edwin Encarnación (born 1983), Dominican baseball player
- Jerar Encarnación (born 1997), Dominican baseball player
- José Encarnación Jr. (1928–1998), Filipino economist and academic
- Jose Izquierdo Encarnacion (born 1957), Puerto Rican politician
- Juan Encarnación (born 1976), Dominican baseball player
- Luis Encarnación (born 1963), Dominican baseball player
- Mario Encarnación (1975–2005), Dominican baseball player
- Ranfis Encarnación (born 1996), Dominican boxer
- Vicente Singson Encarnacion (1875–1961), Filipino politician and businessperson
- William Encarnación (born 1988), Dominican boxer

== Places ==
- Encarnación, Paraguay
- Encarnación, Peñuelas, Puerto Rico, a barrio in the municipality of Peñuelas, Puerto Rico
- La Encarnación, Honduras
- La Encarnación, a district of Asunción, Paraguay
- Municipality of Encarnación de Diaz, Mexico
- Pitcairn Islands, one of which was named "La Encarnación" by Pedro Fernandes de Queirós in 1606

== Ships ==
- Spanish ship Nuestra Señora de Encarnación
- Nuestra Señora de la Encarnación y Desengaño, a Spanish galleon captured by William Dampier in 1709

== Other ==
- Encarnación (sculpting), a sculpting technique
- Encarnación (film), a 2007 film by Anahí Berneri
