= Thomas Judge =

Thomas Judge may refer to:

- Thomas Lee Judge, American politician, governor of Montana
- Thomas J. Judge, Alabama lawyer, politician and judge
- Thomas Augustine Judge, American Catholic priest
- Tom Judge, American soccer player
