= Rosa Rosenberg =

Mexican artist (1921–1981)

Rosa Rosenberg at her home studio in Mexico City

Rosa Rosenberg (January 8, 1921 – April 23, 1981) was a surrealist Mexican painter. Born in Lemberg, Poland (now Lviv, Ukraine) she emigrated to Mexico at the age of two. She studied painting privately; in 1966 she won first place in the competition "Nuevos Valores", which had been put on by the Hebrew Sports Center. She exhibited work between 1968 and 1975, her work was featured in a group exhibition in 1975 at the Palacio de Bellas Artes. Her last solo exhibition was at Galeria Lanai in May 1979. She died in Mexico City.

== Early life ==
Rosa Rosenberg (maiden name Seifer) was born in Lviv, Poland to parents Ignacio Seifer and María Lazchower. The Seifers moved to Mexico escaping social upheaval and unrest in Poland. Accompanied by Ignacio's mother, Ethel, and Rosa's older sister, Lea, they arrived in the port of Veracruz in November 1923, immediately after they established residence in Mexico City. In the following years, two more daughters were born to the marriage, Dora and Flora.

She attended an elementary school located in the street of Correo Mayor, and middle school at Secundaria Número Dos, she later obtained a degree in Commerce and Administration, and studied English and French. In 1942 she married Moishe Rosenberg, an Ashkenazi Jewish immigrant who owned a jewelry store in the central area of Mexico City.

Her first child died shortly after birth, and her second, Samuel, perished in an accident at the age of 23, she had two more children, León and Florence Rosenberg.

== Professional career ==
In 1966 Rosa won first prize in the competition "Nuevos Valores” at the Centro Deportivo Israelita. Two years later, in 1968, she was invited to participate in a large scale collective show at the Galería Chapultepec as part of the Festival Internacional de las Artes, a cultural program of the XIX Olympic games held in Mexico City.

Rosenberg opened her first solo exhibition on August 13, 1968, at the Galería Jack Misrachi. Invitations for the show featured text praising her work by film director Alejandro Jodorowsky, this collection was positively reviewed in several newspapers, including Últimas Noticias, El Heraldo de México, El Día, The News, Novedades, Excélsior, and others.

On September 29, 1970, her second solo show opened at the Mer-Kup gallery owned by art dealer Merle de Kuper. Obtaining similar critical response as the Misrachi show, her career would launch into more invitations to group exhibitions and interviews by local reporters where her work was compared to the likes of Remedios Varo, Leonora Carrington, and Salvador Dalí.

Her first international appearance happened at the Mabat Galleries in Tel Aviv, where Mexican Ambassador Rosario Castellanos, spoke at the inaugural event. During July and August 1975, as a part of International Women's Year, her work was included in the group exhibit titled 'La mujer y la plástica' at the Palacio de Bellas Artes museum.

On May 22, 1979, her last solo show, 'Surrealismo y Fantasía' opened at the Galería Lanai showing 17 oil paintings. In the same year, the Enciclopedia de México includes, for the first time, a short entry about her.

== List of exhibitions ==
Individual

- August 1968, Galería Jack Misrachi
- September 1970, Galería Mer-Kup
- August 1971, Mabat Galleries
- October 1975, Club de Golf Bellavista
- May 1979, Galería Lanai.

Group

- December 1966, Centro Deportivo Israelita
- February 1968, Galería Chapultepec
- October 1970, Centro Deportivo Israelita
- April – May 1971, Galería Mer-Kup
- February 1974, Westside Jewish Community Center, Los Angeles, California
- July – August 1975, Palacio de Bellas Artes
- September 1976, Centro Deportivo Israelita
- September 1977, Galería Mer-Kup
- October 1977, Galería Silvya Ocerkovsky
- May 1978, Centro Deportivo Israelita
