= Encarnación Padilla de Armas =

Puerto Rican community organizer

- Born: 1909
- Died: August 1992

Encarnación Padilla de Armas (c. 1909 – August 1992) was a community leader, organizer, and advocate for the Spanish speaking community in Mexico, Puerto Rico, and the United States. She is also considered to be the "first Latina to achieve national leadership" in the Catholic Church.

== Personal life ==
Padilla de Armas was born in Puerto Rico and raised in a Catholic family. Her father assisted the church with missionary work, and her mother held a position in the Catholic Daughters of the Americas.

At a young age Padilla de Armas was recognized by the Sisters of the Missionary Servants of the Most Holy Trinity, and in turn Father Thomas Augustine Judge. Judge, who had founded the women's arm of the Missionary Servants of the Most Holy Trinity in the mid-1920s, thought Padilla de Armas should pursue a vocation with the Holy Trinity. This occurred at a time when Judge had been encouraging community members to continue doing public service as laypeople instead of taking up the vocation. Possibly due to financial constraints as well as family dedication to the Holy Trinity, Padilla de Armas was put into the care of the Sisters instead of being sent to college. Soon after, Judge had her travel to the Holy Trinity headquarters in Brooklyn, where she could make connections and see some of the public service work that they did there. She received a bachelor's degree and an honorary doctorate from Fordham University.

Padilla de Armas returned to Puerto Rico, eventually establishing herself in Havana, Cuba, where she received a doctorate in law, married, and had a son, Ramon Bosch. Widowed in 1945, she returned to the United States and settled in New York City with her son and only $150 to her name.

== Religious leadership ==
Padilla de Armas encouraged the Catholic Church as well as other religious denominations in New York to expand their services to the Puerto Rican population by holding services in Spanish and having Puerto Rican representation in church leadership. In 1951, she organized a group of women to write a report on the religious needs and well-being of Puerto Ricans in the city in order to get the attention of the Archdiocese of New York. This report helped form the Spanish Catholic Action office two years later. Later, while working with the First National Hispanic Encuentro (1972), Padilla de Armas educated diocesan priests in Puerto Rican language and culture.
