= St. Vincent's Seminary =

St. Vincent's Seminary may refer to:

- St. Vincent's Seminary (Missouri), operated during the 19th century by the Congregation of the Mission
- St. Vincent's Seminary (Germantown), formerly operated by the Congregation of the Mission in Philadelphia, Pennsylvania

== See also ==
- Saint Vincent Seminary, operated by St. Vincent Archabbey in Latrobe, Pennsylvania
