= Father Judge High School =

Location
- 3301 Solly Avenue; Philadelphia, Pennsylvania 19136; United States; 40°2′55″N 75°1′25″W

Information
- Type: Catholic high school
- Motto: Latin: Non Excidet (He will not fall away)
- Religious affiliation: Catholic Church
- Denomination: Oblates of St. Francis de Sales
- Patron saint: Francis de Sales
- Established: 1954
- Status: Currently operational
- Oversight: Roman Catholic Archdiocese of Philadelphia
- CEEB code: 393305
- NCES School ID: 01186718
- President: Brian P. King
- Principal: Patricia Rooney
- Staff: 42.3 (on an FTE basis)
- Grades: 9–12
- Gender: All-male
- Enrollment: 767 (2019–2020)
  - Grade 9: 196
  - Grade 10: 178
  - Grade 11: 201
  - Grade 12: 192
- Average class size: 29
- Student to teacher ratio: 18.1:1
- Hours in school day: 6.7
- Colors: Sheridan Red and Columbia Blue
- Slogan: Live today well
- Song: Alma Mater
- Athletics conference: Philadelphia Catholic League
- Mascot: Crusader
- Nickname: Crusaders
- Rivals: North Catholic (traditional) Archbishop Ryan (contemporary)
- Accreditation: MSA
- Publication: Writer's Bloc
- Newspaper: The Crusader
- Yearbook: The Quest
- Website: www.fatherjudge.com

Father Judge High School is a Roman Catholic high school in Philadelphia, Pennsylvania, United States. The Oblates of St. Francis de Sales provide ministerial leadership to the school community, which the Roman Catholic Archdiocese of Philadelphia established in 1954.

== History ==
The school is named for Father Thomas Augustine Judge (1868–1933), who organized lay missionaries in the northeastern United States and founded the Missionary Servants of the Most Holy Trinity. Fr. Judge also founded the congregation of sisters whose "motherhouse" is located next to the high school; these sisters then donated a portion of the land to the archdiocese on which the school was built.

== Curriculum ==
The school offers eleven Advanced Placement classes for sophomore, junior, and senior students: U.S. Government & Politics, English Language and Composition, Literature, Calculus, European History, U.S. History, Psychology, Seminar, Physics, Environmental Science, and Biology.

== Extracurricular activities ==
=== Father Judge Model United Nations Team ===
2006 World Model United Nations Champions

- UNA-USA Model United Nations Conference: 1st place (1999, 2002, 2006, 2007, 2008) - Father Judge is the only school to have won this title in back-to-back-to-back seasons, and the only school to have won this award five times.
- North American Invitational Model United Nations: 1st place (2000, 2003)
- Honorary resolutions from both the Philadelphia City Council and Pennsylvania State Senate for their achievements in debate

=== Crusader News Network ===
CNN (Crusader News Network) is Father Judge's student-run network television station. Renovated in 2013–2014 with the help of several students from the class of 2014, CNN provides live announcements during homeroom via the school's YouTube Channel.

=== Athletics ===
The school is a member of the Philadelphia Catholic League (PCL) and the Philadelphia City (now PIAA District XII). The Athletic Department currently offers 16 interscholastic athletic programs and two club sports programs. The athletic programs offered at Father Judge include soccer, football, golf, cross country, fall crew, basketball, wrestling, bowling, indoor track, baseball, lacrosse, outdoor track, tennis, spring crew, and club sports ice hockey. The school has participated in 59 PCL Championships and 18 City (District XII) Championships over its 60-year history, with the most recent teams of soccer, wrestling, and bowling capturing their titles in the 2013–2014 season. Joe Galasso was the first wrestler from Philadelphia to win a state title in the 138lb weight class for wrestling. They won the Men's Basketball PCL Championship in the 24/25 season.

The school has two gymnasiums (Fox Gymnasium and Mitchell Activity Center), a wrestling training room, a weight room and fitness center, a track & athletic complex, a synthetic turf multi-purpose (football, soccer, lacrosse, rugby) field, an artificial turf baseball field, three locker rooms, and a cross country course in nearby Pennypack Park.

The school launched the Patrick S. McGonigal '81 Center for Fitness and Wellness in 2013 to offer fitness and wellness programming open to the entire student body. The center offers fitness programming, strength training, intramurals, and an Outdoor Recreation Club.

== Notable alumni ==
- Joe Bonikowski, baseball pitcher
- Joseph R. Cistone, bishop, diocese of Saginaw
- Jeffrey Clark, attorney indicted among the co-conspirators to overturn the 2020 US presidential election
- Kyle Daukaus, mixed martial arts fighter
- Joseph DeFelice, former regional administrator of the U.S. Department of Housing and Urban Development
- Bob File, baseball pitcher
- Dan Hammer, baseball pitcher
- Kevair Kennedy, basketball player
- Joe Kerrigan, baseball pitcher and manager
- Frank Legacki, swimmer and entrepreneur
- Dan McCaffery, associate justice of the Pennsylvania Supreme Court
- Mike McCloskey, NFL player
- Michael McGeehan, member of the Pennsylvania House of Representatives
- John Sabatina, member of the Pennsylvania House of Representatives
- Vincent Wolanin, athlete, businessman, philanthropist
