= Haciendas de Jalisco y Aledaños (1506–1821) =

1974 book by Ricardo Lancaster-Jones y Verea

- Author: Ricardo Lancaster-Jones y Verea
- Language: Spanish
- Subject: Haciendas, Mexico, History
- Genre: thesis
- Publisher: Financiera Aceptaciones S.A.
- Publication place: Mexico
- Media type: Print (Paperback)
- Pages: 95 p., [19] leaves of plates : ill.; 24 cm.

Haciendas de Jalisco y Aledaños (1506–1821) is a history of haciendas written in Spanish by Ricardo Lancaster-Jones y Verea (1905–83). It the most complete book about rural properties of the State of Jalisco and their development from the origin of the Kingdom of Nueva Galicia in early 16th Century to the independence of Mexico in 1821. It was the first publication in its kind in western Mexico.

A summary of this book is mentioned in the bulletin of the Real Academia Española (1975); it also appears in the bibliography of many contemporary authors like Rodolfo Fernández (2003), Jean Meyer (1990), Ramón María Serrera (1977), Eric Van Young (1983), etc.

== History ==
The book's author was requested by Financiera Aceptaciones S.A. (a finance company from Mexico's Banco Serfin), to publish this work for the Mexican public due to the interest of the Mexican Academic circles, it was inspired by his own thesis "Haciendas de Jalisco y aledaños: fincas rústicas de antaño, 1506–1821", a 270 pages work that was made to obtain a Master of Arts degree in Latin American Studies at the University of New Mexico in 1973.

This book was published in August 1974 by Financiera Aceptaciones S.A. at "Vera" press, in Guadalajara, Jalisco (Mexico), with a circulation of 2000 copies.

== Table of Contents ==
- Prefacio
- Capítulo I. Como encontraron la tierra los Conquistadores.
- Capítulo II. Algunas Mercedes del Siglo XVI.
- Capítulo III. Reestructuraciones del Siglo XVII.
- Capítulo IV. Más cambios en el Siglo XVIII.
- Capítulo V. Mayorazgos de Nueva Galicia y Provincia de Avalos.
- Capítulo VI. Las Propiedades Rústicas de la Iglesia en Nueva Galicia y Provincia de Avalos, después Intendencia de Guadalajara.
- Conclusiones
- Bibliografía
- Lista de Ilustraciones

1 Arco Triunfal de la Venta del Astillero.
2 Merced a Pedro Plascencia, 1593.
3 Documento del Mayorazgo de Porres Baranda, S. XVII.
4 Ordenanzas Reales, Manuscrito, 1768, portada.
5 Continuación del anterior, página interior.
6 Licencia para marcar ganado, 1779, primera página.
7 Continuación del anterior, página interior.
8 Retrato de Don Pedro Sánchez de Tagle, dueño de Cuisillos y Santa Ana Apacueco.
9 Hacienda de Toluquilla, acueducto S. XVIII.
10 Parroquia de Ciénega de Mata, S. XVIII.
11 Portada de la Casa de Ciénega de Mata, S. XVIII.
12 Patio interior de la Casa de Ciénega de Mata, S. XVIII.
13 Ruinas de la Casa de la Hacienda del Cabezón.
14 Fuente de la Casa de la Hacienda del Cabezón, ya desaparecida.
15 Casa de la Hacienda de Portillo, frente al Río Santiago.
16 Mapa de Nueva España, 1579.
17 Plano de la Hacienda de Santa Ana Apacueco, 1756.
18 Plano de Tepic y sus alrededores, S. XVIII.
19 Croquis de la Hacienda de Toluquilla, S. XVI.
20 Plano de la Hacienda de Mazatepec, S. XIX.

== Book cataloguing data ==
This book is catalogued in many public libraries thorough Mexico and abroad, among them:

=== Library of Congress ===
- This book is catalogued at the Library of Congress as follows:

LC Control No.: 76469878
LCCN Permalink: Haciendas de Jalisco y aledaños, 1506–1821
Type of Material: Book (Print, Microform, Electronic, etc.)
Personal Name: Lancaster-Jones, Ricardo.
Main Title: Haciendas de Jalisco y aledaños (1506–1821) / Ricardo Lancaster-Jones.
Published/Created: Guadalajara, México. : Financiera Aceptaciones, 1974.
Description: 95 p., [19] leaves of plates : ill.; 24 cm.
Notes: Bibliography: p. 89-95.
Subjects: Haciendas --Mexico --History.
LC Classification: HD1471.M6 L36

=== Biblioteca Nacional de México ===
- This book is catalogued at the Biblioteca Nacional de México as follows:

No. sis.: 000161259
Colección: General (BN)
Clasificación: G 630.97232 LAN.h.
Autor principal: Lancaster-Jones, Ricardo
Título: Haciendas de Jalisco y aledaños (1506–1821)
Lugar: Guadalajara, Jal., México
Editorial: Financiera Aceptaciones S.A. [Vera]
Año: 1974
Descripción: 95 p. : il.; 24 cm.
Bibliografía: Incluye bibliografías
Tema: Haciendas, México, Historia

=== Biblioteca Nacional de España ===
- This book is catalogued at the Biblioteca Nacional de España as follows:

CDU: 333.5(72)"15/18"
CDU: 972"15/18"
Autor personal: Lancaster-Jones, Ricardo
Título: Haciendas de Jalisco y aledaños (1506–1821) [Texto impreso]
Publicación: México : [Financiera Aceptaciones], 1974
Descripción física: 95 p., 2 h. : lám. y map.; 24 cm
Encabez. materia: Propiedad rústica -- México -- S.XVI-XVIII
Encabez. materia: Propiedad rústica -- México -- S.XIX
Encabez. materia: Haciendas -- México -- Historia
