= Gutierre Tibón =

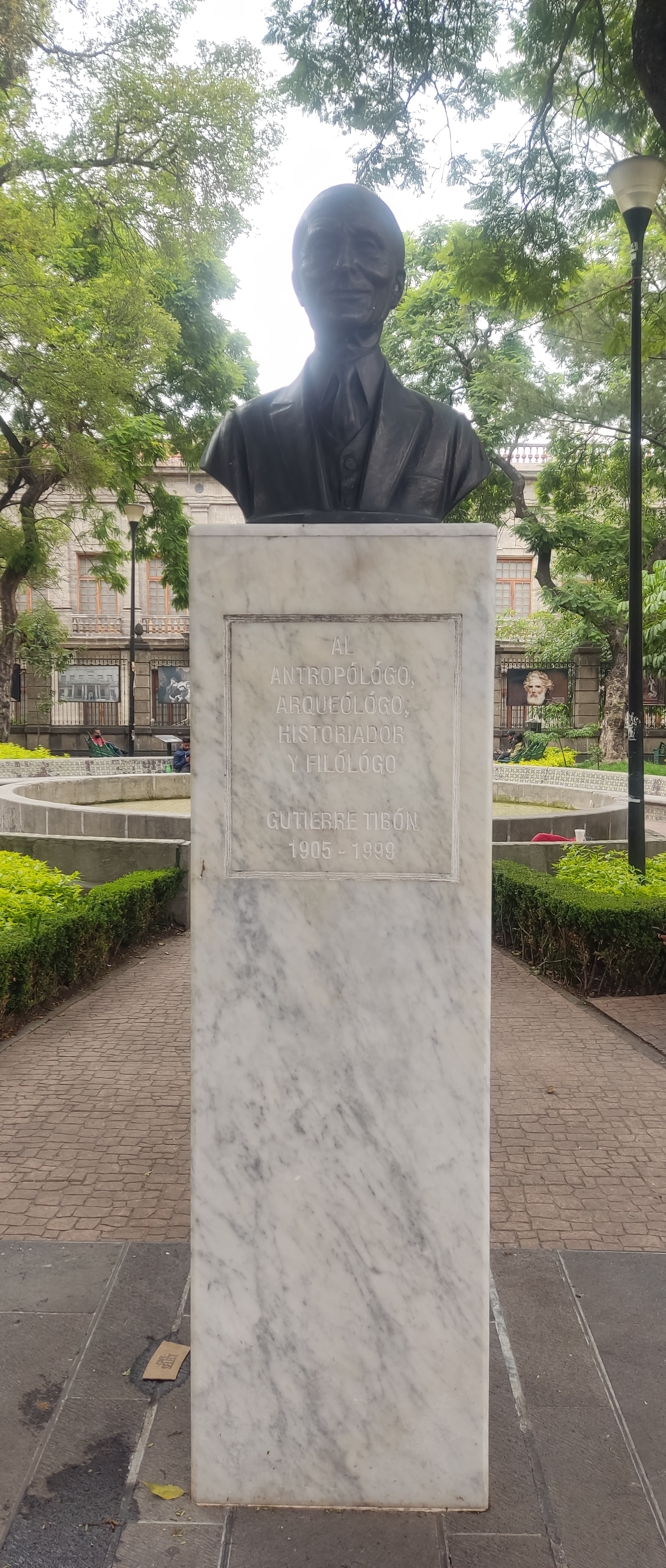
Bust of Tibón in Cuauhtémoc, Mexico City

Gutierre Tibón (16 July 1905 – 15 May 1999) was an Italian-Mexican writer. He wrote widely on issues of cultural identity, mixing ideas from anthropology, linguistics, psychology, philosophy, ethnology, sociology, and political science.

== Early career ==
Tibón was born in Lombardy, Italy. In his early years he worked as a typewriter salesman, and later travelled widely in Europe and the Americas for his work. His visits to Mexico attracted him to the country, and he moved there in 1940. He established himself as a writer and radio personality. His first major work was on the culture and future prospects of Mexico. México, 1950, un país en futuro (1942) looked forward to what he called a México feliz, which he thought could be achieved by 1950. He advocated strong leadership and government intervention to promote mass education. He later had a success with Viaje a la India por el aire, which originated as broadcast conversations with the poet Ricardo López Méndez about his travels in the Middle East on the way to India. Tibón's ability to mix anecdotes, philosophical observations and political commentary on the culture of the countries he passed through proved popular. He was awarded an honorary doctorate by the Universidad Michoacana de San Nicolás de Hidalgo on 11 October 1946 for his writings.

== Onomastics ==
Tibón was especially interested in the history of personal and topographical names. His book América: Setenta siglos de la historia de un nombre (1945) constitutes what has been called a "novelized study in which a word is the chief character". He argues that the name "America" is "a masterpiece of chance", and proceeds to trace its etymology from the personal name of Amerigo Vespucci to its Germanic original Amalric and to ancient roots, which he claims to link to the meaning "land of industrious and powerful men". In Origen, vida y milagros de su spellido, he extended this method to the discussion of personal names, providing elaborate historical genealogies and anecdotes to create a narrative of humanity though names. He was most interested in Spanish and Sephardic Jewish names.

In 1946 the Academia Mexicana de Genealogía y Heráldica elected him as a numerary member.

== Later work ==
His later writings continue his interest in names, but also branch out to include mysticist or occult topics. He developed the method of his book on America in his discussion of the origins of Mexico in Historia del nombre y de la fundación de México (1975).

In El Ombligo como centro cósmico (1981), he argued for the survivals of "paleolithic magic" in a "prenatal triad" of umbilical cord, placenta and amniotic sac and on the navel as "cosmic center". In Los Ritos Mágicos y Trágicos de la Pubertad Femenina (1984) he explored the "magic and tragic rites" of female puberty.

He was elected to the Academia Mexicana de la Lengua as an honorary member on 10 December 1987.

From 1959 until his death at the age of 93, Tibón lived in Acapantzingo, Cuernavaca, Morelos.

== Published works ==
- 1942, México 1950, un país en futuro
- 1944, Viaje a la India por el aire
- 1945, América, Setenta siglos de la historia de un nombre
- 1946, Aventuras de Gog y Magog
- 1946, Origen, vida y milagros de su apellido
- 1947, Divertimentos lingüísticos de Gog y Magog
- 1956, Diccionario etimológico de los nombres propios de las personas
- 1957, Introducción al budismo
- 1961, Pinotepa Nacional. Mixtecos, negros y triquis
- 1967, Mujeres y diosas en México
- 1972, El mundo secreto de los dientes
- 1975, Historia del nombre y de la fundación de México
- 1979, El ombligo como centro erótico
- 1981, El ombligo como centro cósmico: Una contribución à la historia de las religiones
- 1981, La tríade prenatal: cordón, placenta, amnios. Supervivencia de la magia paleolítica
- 1983, El jade en México: el mundo esotérico del chalchihuite
- 1983, La ciudad de los hongos alucinantes
- 1984, Los ritos mágicos y trágicos de la pubertad femenina
- 1986, Diccionario etimólogico comparado de nombres propios de personas

== See also ==
- List of people from Morelos
