= Juan Martínez Montañés =

Spanish sculptor

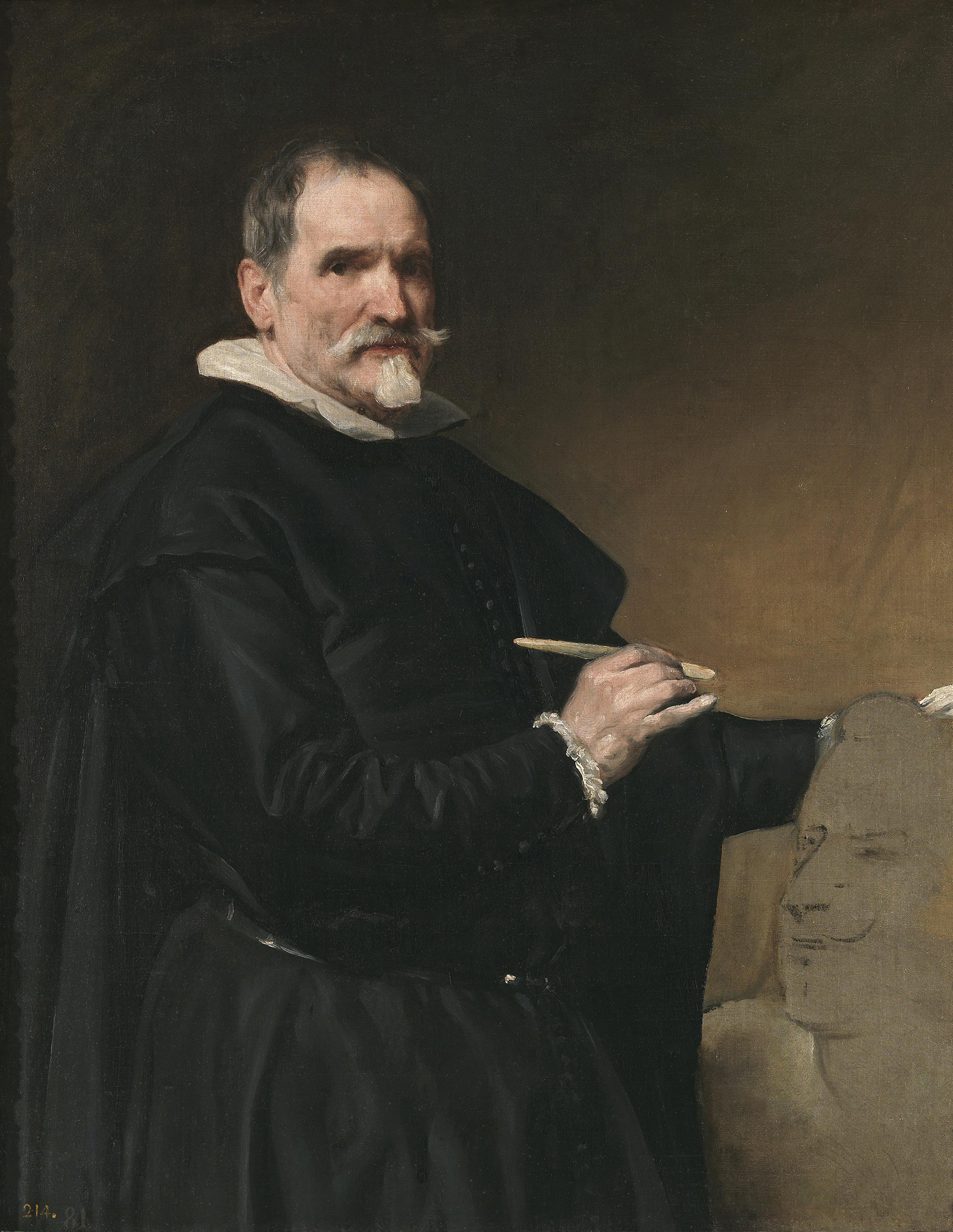
Portrait of Montañés by Diego Velázquez, 1636

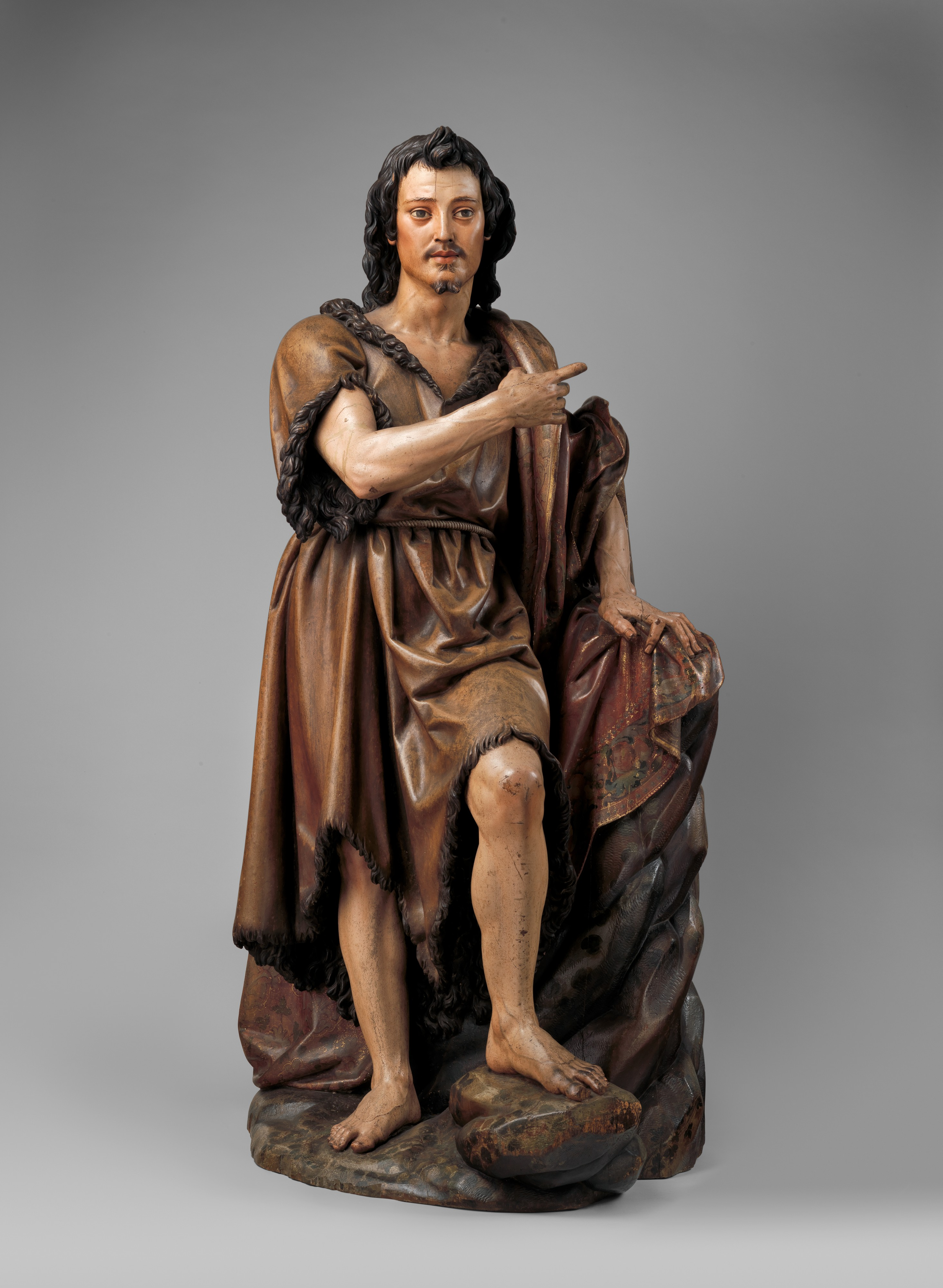
'Saint John the Baptist', painted and gilded wood statue by Juan Martínez Montañés, Spanish, 1st third of 17th century, Metropolitan Museum of Art

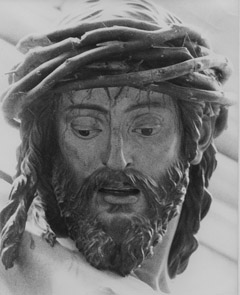
Cristo de la Clemencía, detail; commissioned in 1603, Cathedral sacristy, Seville

Juan Martínez Montañés (March 16, 1568 – June 18, 1649), known as el Dios de la Madera (the God of Wood), was a Spanish sculptor, born at Alcalá la Real, in the province of Jaén. He was one of the most important figures of the Sevillian school of sculpture, and is known for developing the encarnación sculpting technique.

== Biography ==
Juan Martínez Montañés was born on March 16, 1568, in Alcalá la Real, Jaén, Spain. His master was Pablo de Roxas.

His first known work, dating to 1597, is the graceful St. Christopher in the church of El Salvador at Seville. His Boy Christ (dated 1607) is in the sacristy of the cathedral of Seville. His masterpiece, the great altar of St Jerome at San Isidoro del Campo, Santiponce, near Seville, was contracted in 1609 and completed in 1613. Montañés executed most of his sculpture in wood, which was gessoed, polychromed and gilded.

Other works were the great altars at Santa Clara in Seville and at San Miguel in Jerez, the Immaculate Conception and the realistic figure of Christ Crucified in Cristo de la Clemencìa, commissioned in 1603, in the sacristy of Seville cathedral (illustration); the figure of St John the Baptist, and the St Bruno (1620); a tomb for Don Pérez de Guzmán and his wife (1619); the highly realistic polychromed wood head and hands of St Ignatius of Loyola (1610) and of St Francis Xavier in the university church of Seville, where the costumed figures were used in celebrations.

Montañés achieved great fame in his lifetime; he died in 1649, leaving a large family. His works are more realistic than imaginative, but this, allied with an impeccable taste, produced remarkable results. In 1635, in preparation for the bronze equestrian statue of King Philip IV by Pietro Tacca, Montañés went to Madrid and spent seven months there modelling a portrait of Philip IV. The work was sent to Tacca in Florence as primary reference for the King, and the statue was finished in 1640. During his stay in Madrid he had his portrait painted by Diego Velázquez, whose tutor had worked for him.

He had many imitators, including his son Alonzo Martínez, who died in 1668. His students included Juan de Mesa.

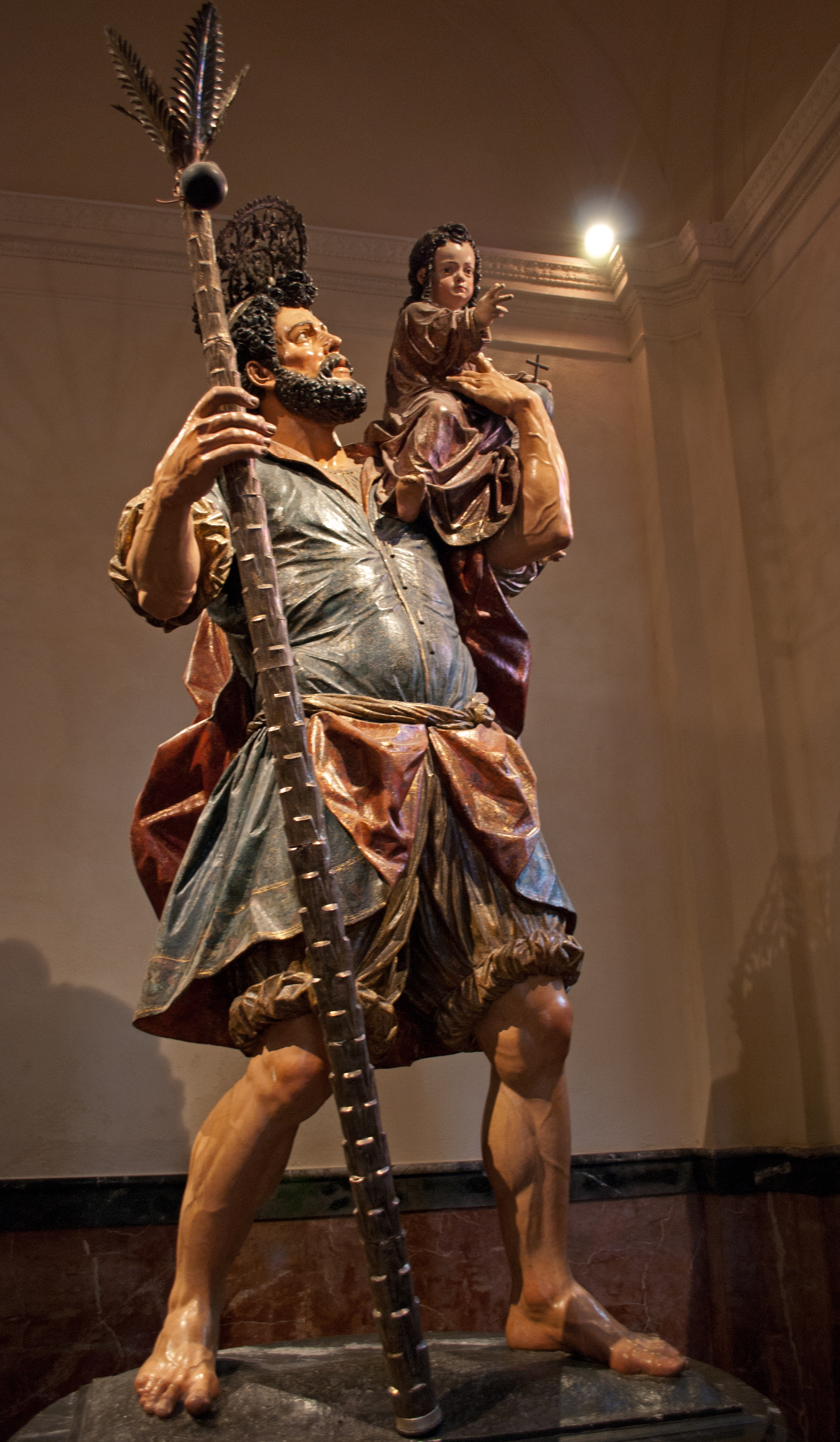
Saint Christopher (1597)

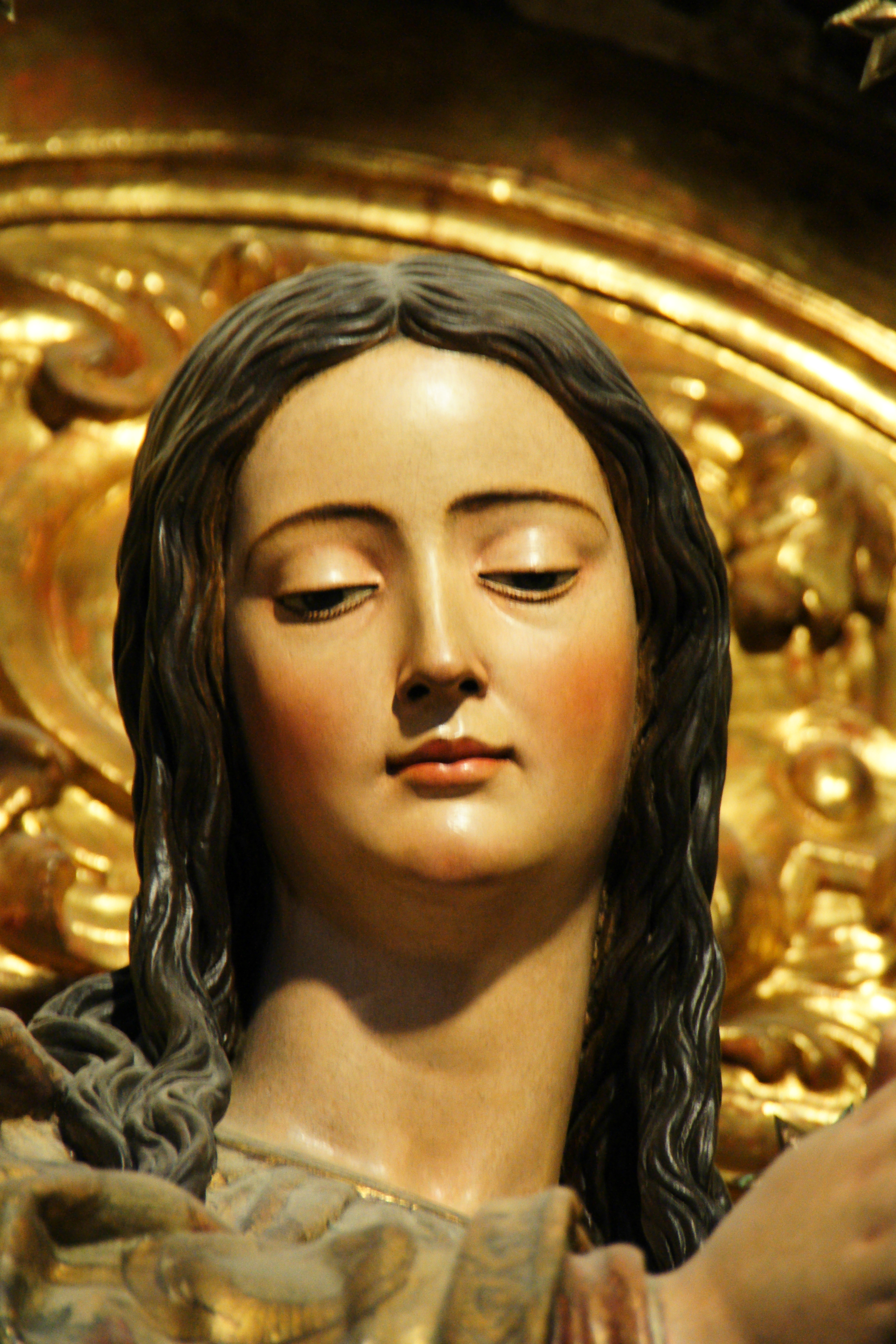
Immaculate La cieguecita (1631)

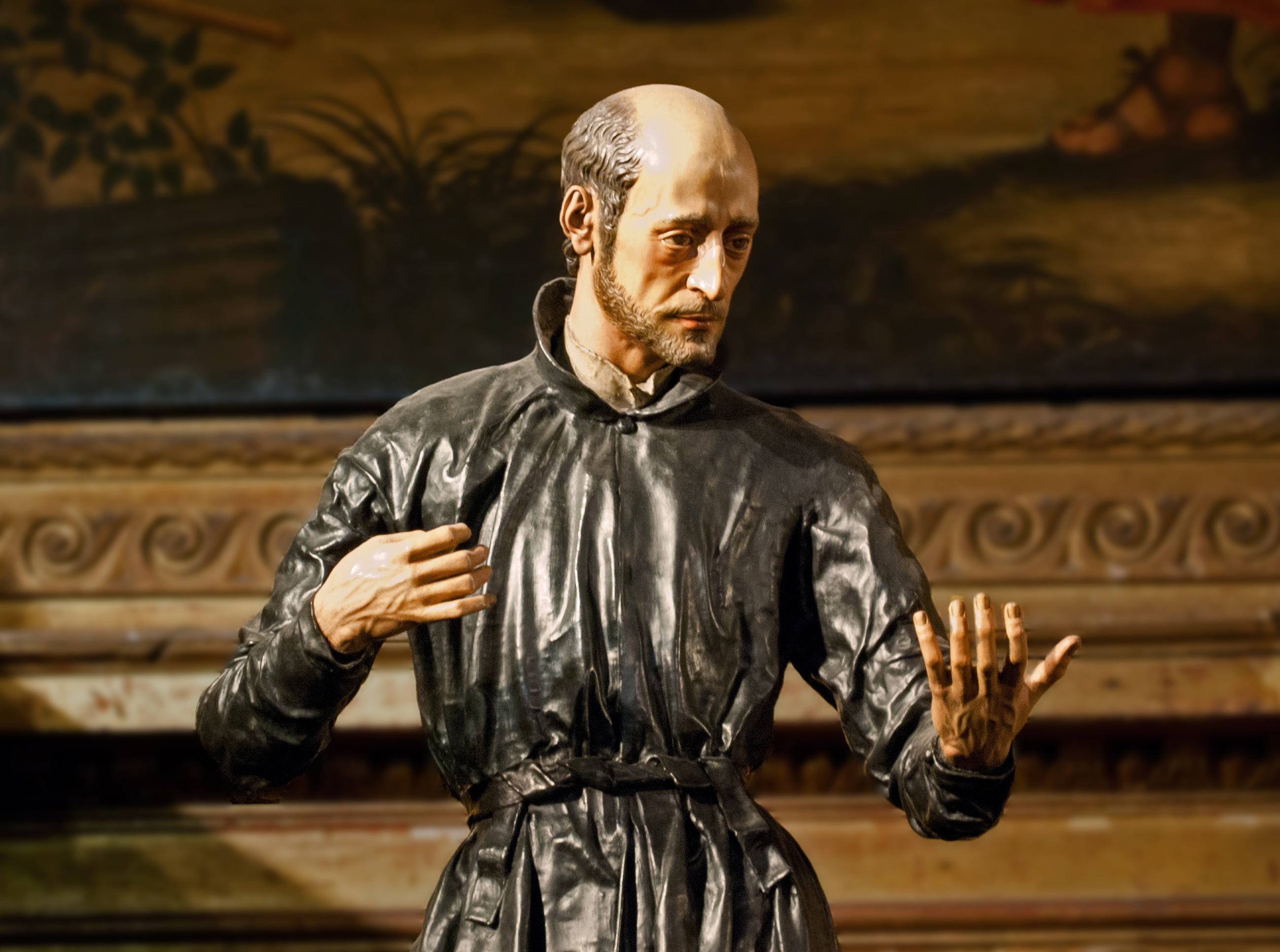
Francis Borgia (1624)

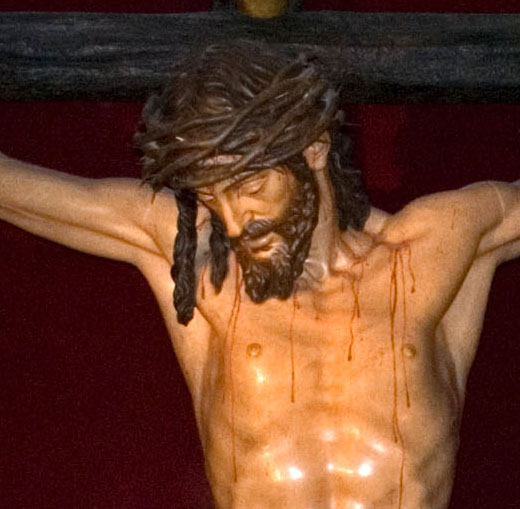
Cristo de la Clemencia (1603)

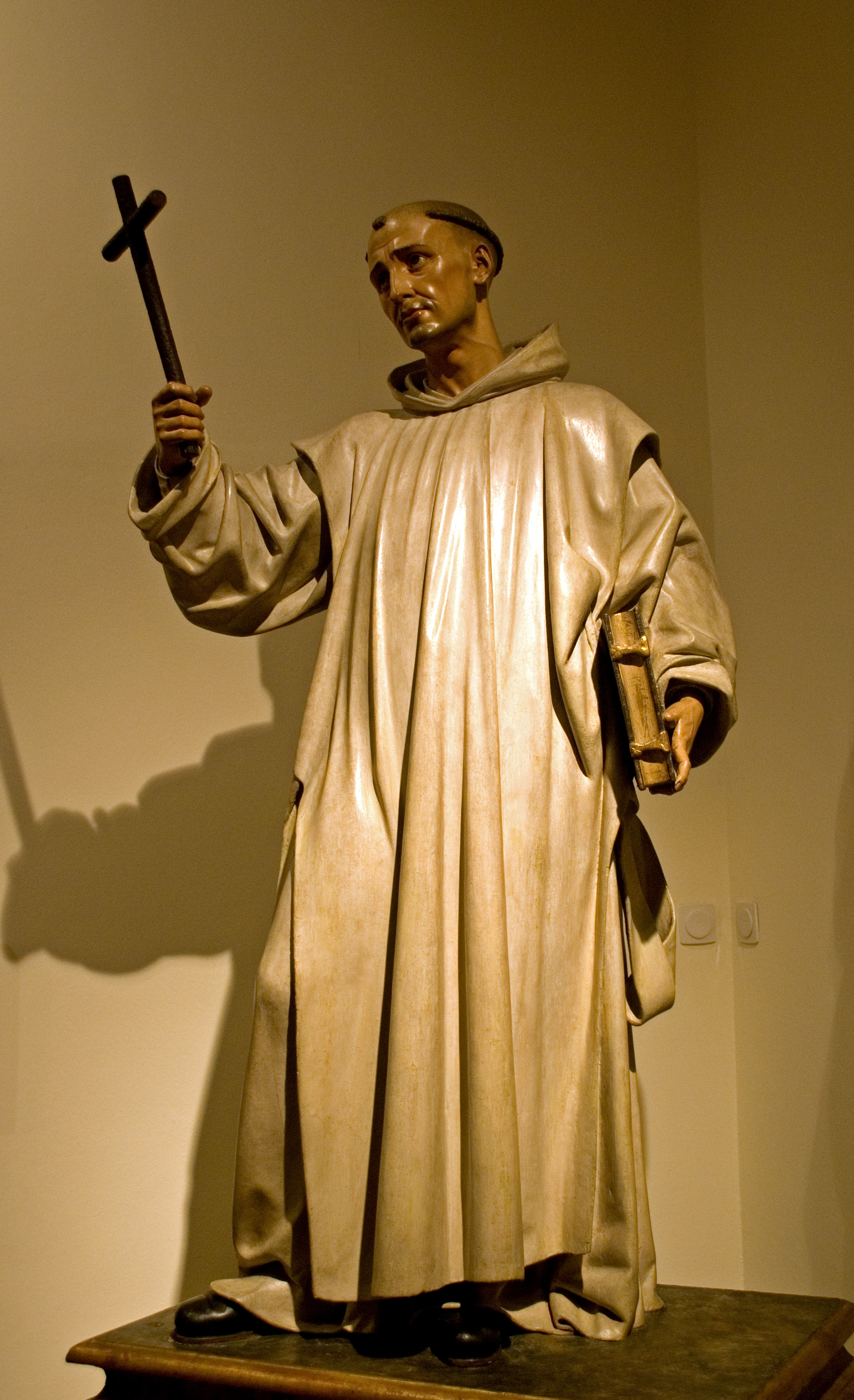
Saint Bruno (1634)
