= Portrait of Juan Martínez Montañés =

1636 painting by Diego Velázquez

Juan Martínez Montañés
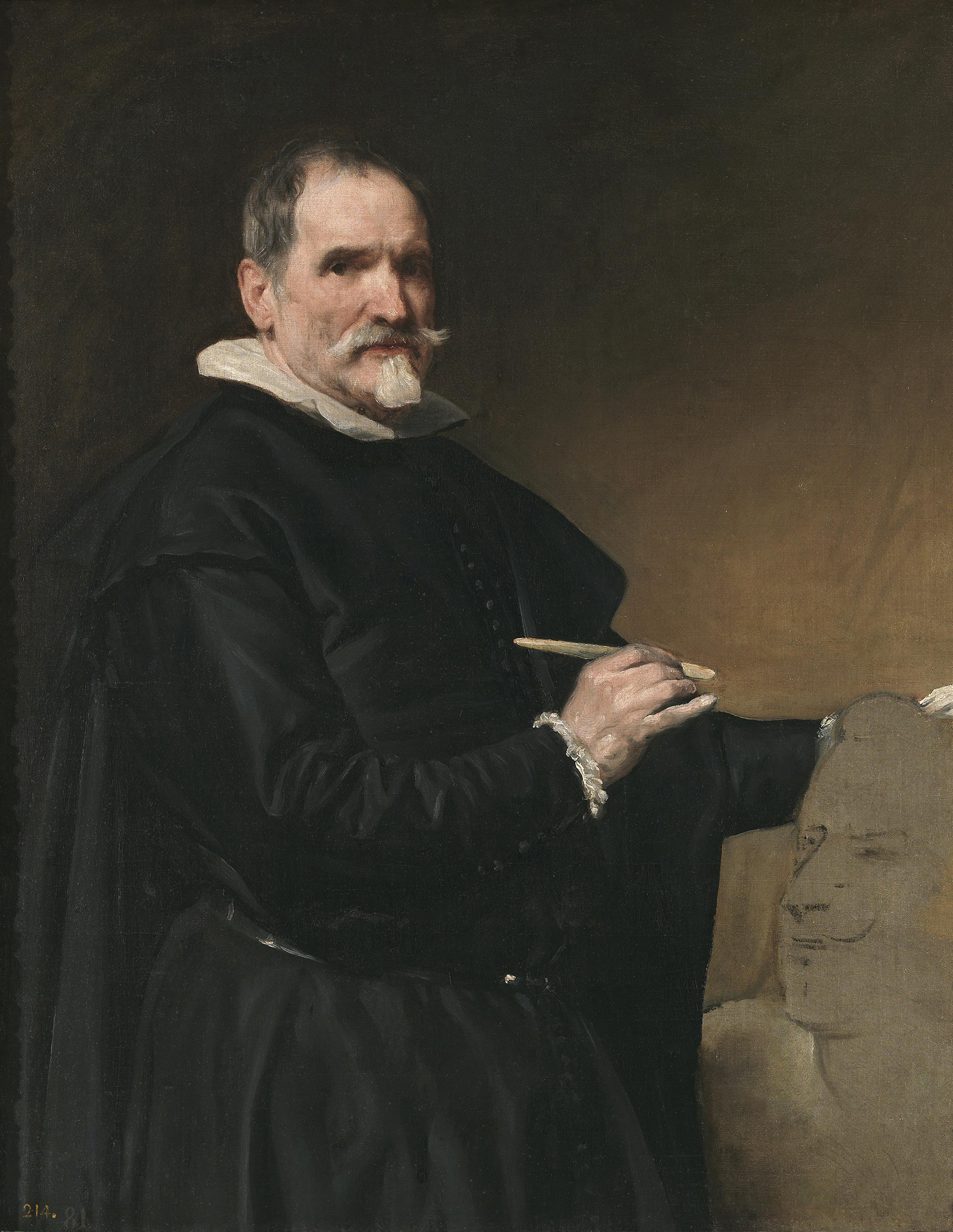
- Artist: Diego Velázquez
- Year: c.1635
- Medium: Oil on canvas
- Dimensions: 109 cm × 88 cm (43 in × 35 in)
- Location: Museo del Prado; Madrid

The Portrait of Juan Martínez Montañés is an unfinished c.1635 oil on canvas portrait of the sculptor Juan Martínez Montañés by Diego Velázquez. It was in the Spanish royal collection, and is now in the collection of the Prado museum in Madrid.

== History ==
Some art historians have suggested that the subject is Velázquez's brother-in-law Alonso Cano, which would date it to Cano's visit to Madrid in 1658, but most agree it depicts Juan Martínez Montañés based on the resemblance to other identified portraits. On that basis, this portrait was probably painted while its subject called on Velázquez during his visit to Madrid between June 1635 and January 1636. The painting measures 109 cm × 88 cm (43 in × 35 in).

Montañés was called to the Spanish royal court in Madrid in 1635 to make a clay bust of Philip IV of Spain as the modello for the Florentine sculptor Pietro Tacca to make a bronze equestrian statue of Philip which is now in the Plaza de Oriente in Madrid. The portrait shows the sculptor working on the bust of the king, shaping the clay with a stick, although the painting is unfinished and the bust is only shown in outline. At a time when artists were often seen as craftsman, Velázquez enhances the sculptor's social status by depicting him in formal black dress with white collar and cuffs, like a nobleman.

Like Cano and Velázquez, Montañés lived and worked in Seville, but he was from the previous artistic generation: at the time of the portrait, Velázquez was 36, but Montañés was 67. Montañés was well known to Velázquez, as Velázquez's master and father-in-law, Francisco Pacheco, had painted many sculptures made by Montañés.

== See also ==
- List of works by Diego Velázquez
