= Gustave Anjou =

American fraudster (1863–1942)

- Born: Gustaf Ludvig Jungberg; December 1, 1863; Stockholm, Sweden
- Died: March 2, 1942 (aged 78); Tottenville, Staten Island
- Resting place: Fairview Cemetery, New York City
- Spouse: Anna Maria Anjou
- Children: 1
- Relatives: Carl Gustaf Jungberg (father); Maria Lovisa Hagberg (mother)
- Writing career
- Pen name: Gustaf Ludvig Ljungberg

Gustave Anjou (December 1, 1863 – March 2, 1942) was a self-professed genealogist who prepared hundreds of fraudulent pedigrees. His first name is sometimes spelled Gustav.

== Biography ==
Born in Katarina Parish in Stockholm, Sweden, Anjou was the natural son of Carl Gustaf Jungberg and his housekeeper Maria Lovisa Hagberg. After serving a prison term in 1886 for forgery, Anjou changed his name to "Gustaf Ludvig Ljungberg" and then began using the alias "Gustave Anjou" (based on the maiden name of his fiancé, Anna Maria Anjou). Usually he used the alias "Gustave Anjou," but occasionally he also used the aliases "H. Anjou" and "M. Anjou." Gustave and Anna Maria married in 1889. Later in life, Gustaf claimed to have been born in Paris, France, including this birthplace on his application to become a naturalised American citizen in 1918.

After emigrating to the U.S. in 1890, Anjou took up residence on Staten Island (Richmond County, New York) and became a naturalized citizen in 1918.

Anjou died on March 2, 1942, at Tottenville, Staten Island, and was buried in Fairview Cemetery (at West New Brighton, Castleton Corners, New York City). He was predeceased by both his Swedish-born wife Anna Maria Anjou (Oct. 21, 1860 – July 6, 1922) and by his only child.

== Genealogical fraud ==
Anjou presented himself as a professional genealogist, and his services were employed by many East Coast (USA) families in the late 19th and early 20th centuries. In 1910, the New York City Directory reported: "British-Am Record Soc, 116 Nassau R [Residence] 1116--C. Percy Hurditch, Pres; Gustave Anjou. Sec.", and in 1912, it reported, "Am Genealogical Soc., 116 Nassau R 1117 - Gustave Anjou, Sec."

Subsequent scholarly investigation of Anjou's findings revealed flawed research with the intent to defraud. In 1991, genealogists Robert Charles Anderson and Gordon L. Remington wrote companion articles in the Genealogical Journal, a publication of the Utah Genealogical Association, elaborating on the nature and extent of the fraud committed by Anjou.

Anderson's article We Wuz Robbed, The 'Modus Operandi' of Gustave Anjou described the manner in which Anjou fabricated the genealogies he prepared. Anderson wrote:

" A typical Anjou pedigree displays four recognizable features:

1. A dazzling range of connections between dozens of immigrants to New England; for example, connections far beyond what may be seen in pedigrees produced by anyone else.
2. Many wild geographical leaps, outside the normal range of migration patterns.
3. An overwhelming number of citations to documents that actually exist, and actually include what Anjou says they include; and
4. Here and there an invented document, without citation, which appears to support the many connections noted under item 1 above."

Remington's article, Gustave We Hardly Knew Ye: A Portrait of Herr Anjou as a Jungberg, revealed Anjou's true identity through exposing the identity of his real biological father.
