= José Rogelio Álvarez =

Mexican writer and historian (1922–2011)

- Born: 12 December 1922 Guadalajara, Jalisco, Mexico
- Died: 2 March 2011 (aged 88) Mexico City, Mexico

José Rogelio Álvarez Encarnación (Note: In this Hispanic American name, the first or paternal surname is Álvarez and the second or maternal family name is Encarnación.) (12 June 1922 – 2 March 2011) was a Mexican historian, writer and encyclopaedist. A member of the Mexican Academy of History and Mexican Academy of Language, he was the general editor of the 2nd edition of the Enciclopedia de México.

== Biography ==
José Rogelio Álvarez was born in Guadalajara, Jalisco, in 1922. He took a degree in history at the National Autonomous University of Mexico (UNAM) and undertook further studies at the National School of Economics and the National School of Anthropology and History (ENAH).

In 1953 he was the private secretary of Governor of Jalisco Agustín Yáñez and continued to work in different positions in that state's public sector for the remainder of the decade. In 1967 he joined the organising committee of the 1968 Summer Olympics, held in Mexico City, and from 1967 to 1970 he was an advisor to Yáñez during his time as the federal secretary of public education. In 1969 he bought the rights to the Enciclopedia de México and oversaw the 1977 publication of the 12-volume second edition. He returned to the Secretariat of Public Education in an advisory role in 1978 and, in 1979, President José López Portillo appointed him the head of the National Council for Educational Development (Consejo Nacional de Fomento Educativo).

He was elected to the Mexican Academy of History (AMH) in 1990 and to the Mexican Academy of Language (AML) in 1988, but did not take up his seat until 1992. He was also an honorary member of the Seminario de Cultura Mexicana.

José Rogelio Álvarez died in Mexico City on 2 March 2011 at the age of 88.

== Publications ==
José Rogelio Álvarez's published works included:

- Guadalajara y sus caminos al mar (1984)
- Summa mexicana: el gran libro sobre México (1991)
- Veinte textos laudatorios (1996)
- Leyendas mexicanas (1998)
