= Thomas Augustine Judge =

1868–1933, Roman Catholic priest

The Reverend Thomas Augustine Judge ST
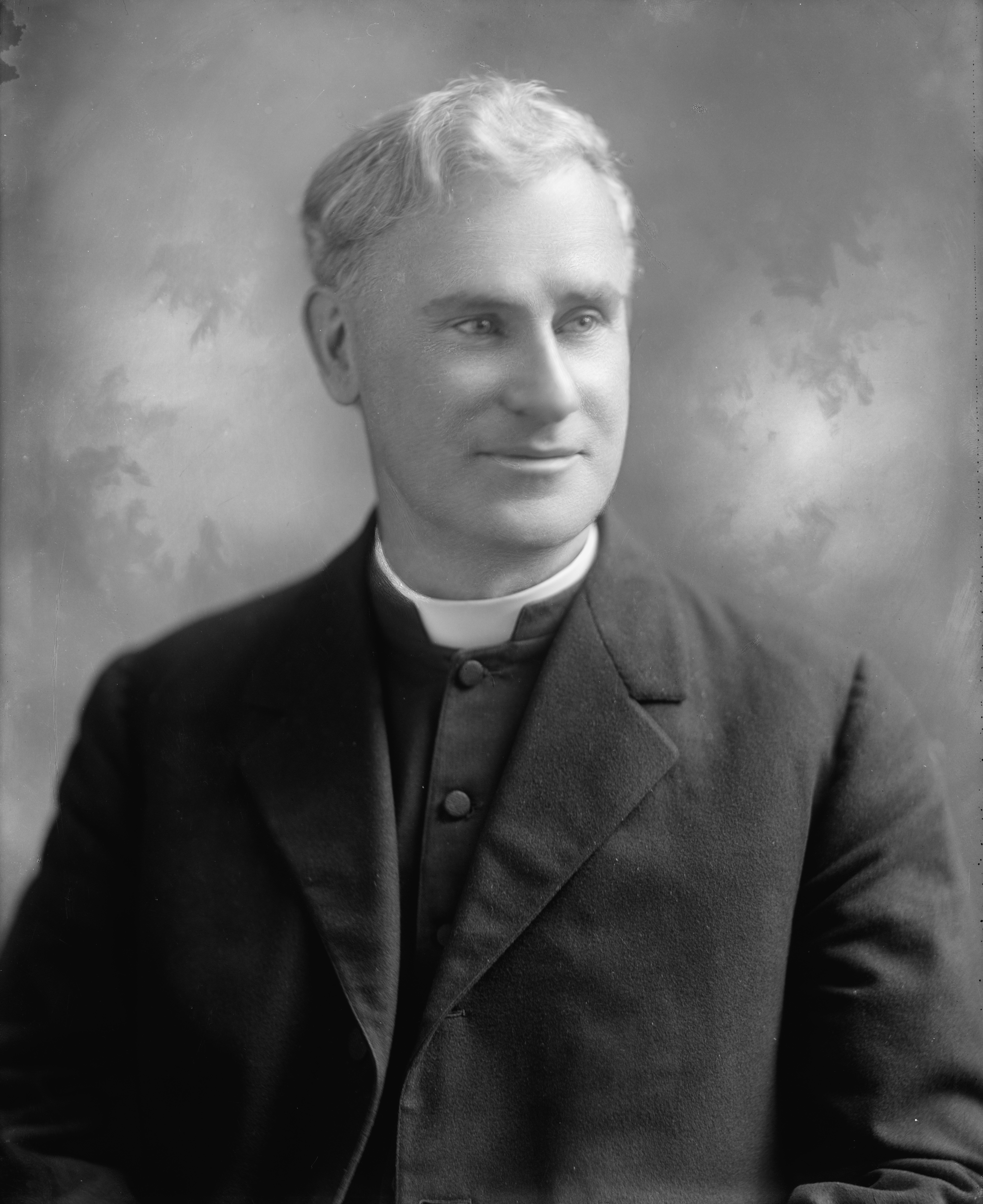
- Judge in c. 1905

Orders
- Ordination: May 27, 1899 by Patrick John Ryan

Personal details
- Born: August 23, 1868 South Boston, Massachusetts, U.S.
- Died: November 23, 1933 (aged 65) Washington, D.C. U.S.
- Buried: Holy Sepulchre Cemetery, Glenside, Pennsylvania U.S.
- Parents: Thomas Judge Sr. Mary Donahue
- Education: John A. Andrew Public School; St. Vincent's Seminary

Thomas Augustine Judge, ST (August 23, 1868 – November 23, 1933) was an American Catholic priest who is most notable for founding the Missionary Servants of the Most Holy Trinity in 1909.

== Biography ==
Judge was born as the fifth of eight children in South Boston on August 23, 1868, to Irish immigrants Thomas Judge, a laborer and painter, and Mary Donahue. As there was no parochial school for him to attend, Judge enrolled into the John A. Andrew Public School in September 1876. On May 3, 1887, his father unexpectedly died; Judge then worked multiple jobs, finishing his high school education by attending night classes.

On January 25, 1890, he entered St. Vincent's Seminary in Germantown and became a member of the Congregation of the Mission in 1895. He then studied philosophy and theology at the St. Vincent's Seminary from 1894 to 1899. Two of his younger sisters entered the Daughters of Charity of Saint Vincent de Paul in 1899. On April 11, 1909, in Brooklyn, along with five women he founded the Missionary Servants of the Most Holy Trinity.

Judge died of an illness on November 23, 1933. His body was at first transferred to the Blessed Trinity Missionary Cenacle the following day, and was buried at the Holy Sepulchre Cemetery six days after his death.

== Legacy ==
The Father Judge High School is named after him.
