= Encarnación Duchi =

Ecuadorian politician

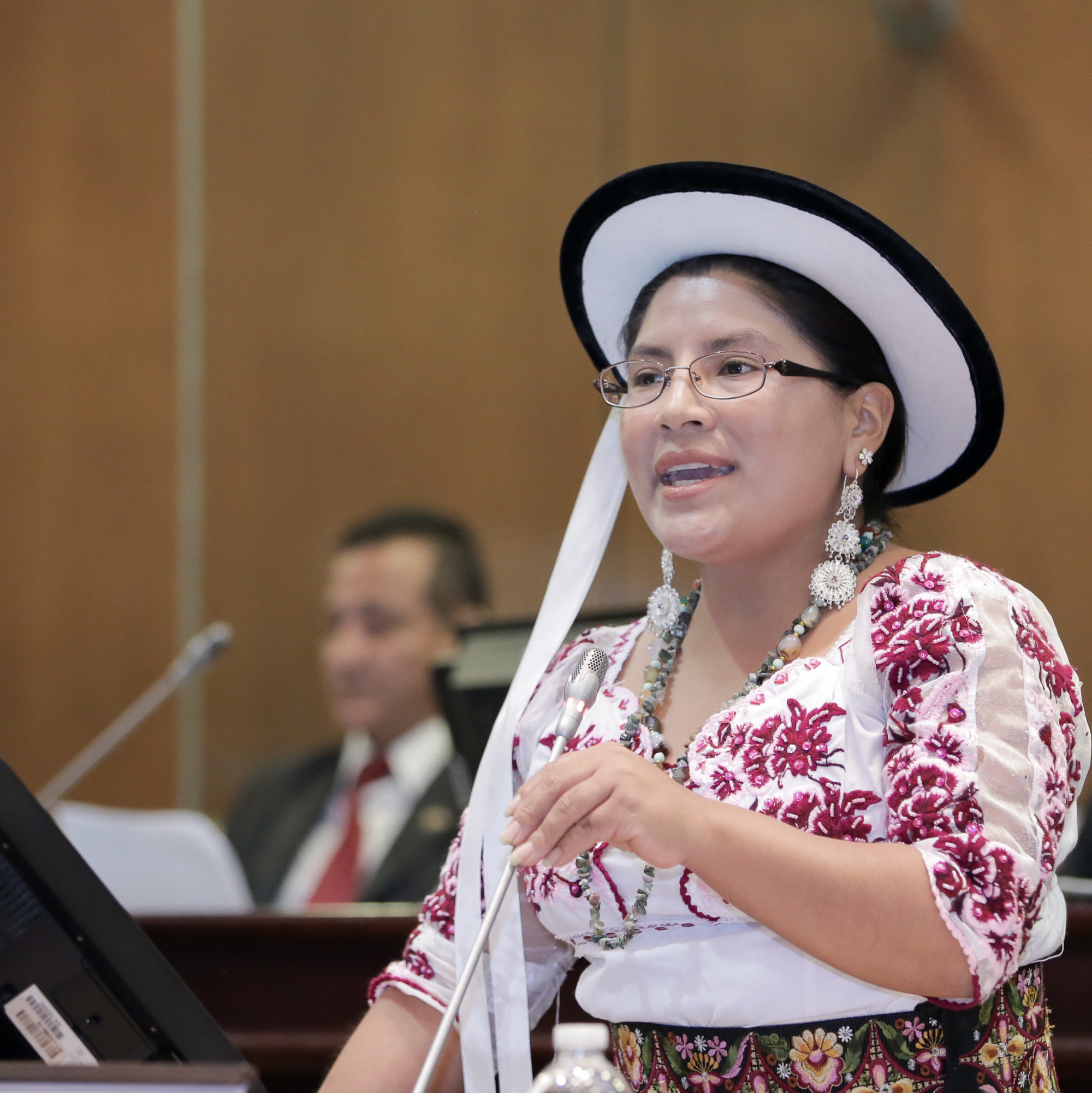
- Born: María Encarnación Duchi Guaman; 1977 (age 48–49)
- Political party: Pachakutik Plurinational Unity Movement – New Country

María Encarnación Duchi Guaman (born 1977) is an Ecuadorian politician and a member of the Pachakutik Plurinational Unity Movement – New Country. She served in the Ecuador's National Assembly.

== Life ==
Duchi's hometown was Chorocopte and she was born in about 1977. Her father was a leading figure in their community and she decided to become a lawyer to support him. She first took a degree in Educational Sciences at the Army Polytechnic School before going on to quality in law at Private Technical University of Loja in 2007. By 2014 she had a masters degree in administrative law.

She joined the Pachakutik Plurinational Unity Movement – New Country, but she never imagined that she would have a role in politics. In her home she had been sent to fetch water from the river and light to read and study came from candles, but in 2017 she was elected to the Ecuador's National Assembly. She became the chair of the Occasional Legislative Commission to address issues and regulations relating to children.

In 2019, she voted against the penal reform that would have allowed for a legal abortion where the pregnancy was the result of rape. Duchi argued that the constitution protected its citizens from their conception to their deaths and this change in law worked against that. 59 members voted against the change.

She noted that she was not discriminated against because of the race but men in politics assumed that they had the right to speak loudest. She served in the assembly until 2021.

== Private life ==
Duchi married and then divorced. Following the divorce she brought up two children while also studying for her qualifications.
