= Armorial of Mexico =

Each of the 31 states of Mexico and Mexico City has a separate coat of arms. Each Mexican state flag contains the respective state arms, typically on a white background.

== Gallery ==
Aguascalientes

Baja California

Baja California Sur

Campeche

Chiapas

Chihuahua

Coahuila

Colima

Durango

Mexico City

Guanajuato

Guerrero

Hidalgo

Jalisco

Mexico

Michoacan

Morelos

Nayarit

Nuevo Leon

Oaxaca

Puebla

Queretaro

Quintana Roo

San Luis Potosi

Sinaloa

Sonora

Tabasco

Tamaulipas

Tlaxcala

Veracruz

Yucatan

Zacatecas

== See also ==
- Coat of arms of Mexico
