= Missionary Servants of the Most Holy Trinity =

The Missionary Servants of the Most Holy Trinity (also known as the Trinity Missionaries) is a religious congregation of men in the Catholic Church, whose headquarters is located in Silver Spring, Maryland. Its membership consists of brothers and ordained priests. Members engage in missionary work with the poor and abandoned in both the United States and Latin America. One of their principal aims is to promote the missionary vocation of the laity. They are also known for supporting parish ministry and for promoting social justice.

As of 2016 the Superior General was Michael K. Barth, S.T. The Missionary Servants of the Most Blessed Trinity is an affiliated women's congregation.

== History ==
=== Founder ===
Thomas Augustine Judge was born in Boston, Massachusetts on 23 August 1868, the fifth of eight children born to Thomas and Mary Danahey Judge. They were Irish immigrants who settled in South Boston. Thomas Judge Sr. was a painter, who died at the age of forty-five, when young Tom was eighteen. His youngest sister, Alice, joined the Daughters of Charity of Saint Vincent de Paul. After his father's death, Judge found work at a post office while completing night school at Boston High.

In January 1890, Judge entered St. Vincent's Seminary (Germantown), Pennsylvania. He was received into the novitiate in 1893, made his vows in 1895, and studied theology until his ordination in May 1899. During his last years in Germantown he organized catechetical and social work among the Italian immigrants in the neighborhood. Shortly before his ordination, Judge was diagnosed with pulmonary tuberculosis. He was sent home to Boston to rest over the summer, and then to Emmitsburg, Maryland on light duty. He was not assigned to a Vincentian mission team until 1903. For the next twelve years, Judge preached parish missions from New Jersey to Puerto Rico, from his base in Germantown. In 1908, he was assigned to promote the Archconfraternity of the Holy Agony, related to a devotion founded in France in the 1850s.

In April 1909, he met, at the St. John Gabriel Perboyre Chapel of St. John the Baptist Church in Brooklyn, with six women volunteers interested in assisting new immigrants from the Catholic countries of eastern and southern Europe to adjust to life in their new country. They began an outreach program to visit homes and offer what help they could. This was the beginning of the Missionary Cenacle Apostolate (lay missionaries). The Missionary Cenacle Lay Apostolate was approved in 1920.

In 1924, Judge established the Shrine of St. Joseph in Stirling, New Jersey. The Missionary Servants continue to operate the shrine.

Outstanding as a preacher of missions and retreats and manifesting an extraordinary zeal for souls, he was widely known and revered. Although remaining a Vincentian priest, his superiors relieved him of his missionary responsibilities so that he could focus on the Cenacle apostolate. He died on 23 November 1933. Father Judge High School in Holmesburg, Philadelphia is named for him.

=== Missionary Servants of the Most Holy Trinity (S.T.) ===
In 1915, Father Judge was assigned to a mission in Opelika, Alabama. Some of the men and women who assisted up North followed. In 1921, the congregation was formally recognized by Edward Patrick Allen, Bishop of Mobile. In 1953, the Missionary Servants purchased the Jordan Springs Estate near Winchester, Virginia for a Monastery and Seminary. The property was leased out in 1972 and is now an event center. In 1958, they were granted approval as a clerical religious congregation of pontifical right.

In Mississippi, they were known for their work at the Sacred Heart Agricultural School in Sulphur Springs. The school burned down in 1954.

As of 2019, there are 121 members of the Missionary Servants including priests, deacons, brothers, and novices, serving in thirty-nine missions located in the United States, Puerto Rico, Colombia, Costa Rica, Haiti, Honduras and Mexico.

==== Governance ====
There is not a conventional governance, otherwise known as a superior general. He is assisted by the general council, which consists of a vicar-general and three general councilors. New leadership is elected every four years. The members are governed according to the congregation's constitution. Unlike most Roman Catholic orders, the congregation is not organized in provinces.

==== Social mission ====
Across the United States, Mexico, and Puerto Rico, Missionary Servant priests and brothers are working in poverty-afflicted urban neighborhoods, immigrant communities, Native American reservations, and small towns in the rural South. In Costa Rica, Honduras, Colombia, and Haiti, they serve communities of people living in towns and tropical rain forests. The priests and brothers serve as pastors, professors, lawyers, chaplains, and counselors.

The Missionary Cenacle Volunteers provides young Catholics with volunteer opportunities in the United States, Mexico and Costa Rica.

==== Habit and dress ====
The Missionary Servant Habit consists of a black cassock closing at the right shoulder with three buttons, symbolizing the Holy Trinity, only with a military collar. The cincture has three tabs, representing the vows of poverty, chastity, and obedience. Sometimes a white habit is worn in warmer climates.

=== Missionary Servants of the Most Blessed Trinity ===
In 1916, Margaret Louise Keasey from Butler, Pennsylvania, joined Judge to teach in Cenacle mission school in Phenix City, Alabama. By 1919, when the fledgling women's religious community was being formed, Judge named her the first General Custodian (MajorSuperior) with the name Mother Boniface. Mother Boniface died in 1931. In February 1932, the sisters received canonical status from Rome under the title, Missionary Servants of the Most Blessed Trinity. Today the Missionary Servants of the Most Blessed Trinity serve the Church in many dioceses across the continental US, Puerto Rico and Mexico.

=== Blessed Trinity Missionary Institute ===
Dr. Margaret Healy knew Father Judge through his preaching in Brooklyn. In 1928 he asked her to assume the role of General Custodian for the combined lay groups, which became known as the Missionary Cenacle Apostolate. Dr. Healy was instrumental in the formation of the Blessed Trinity Missionary Institute, whose members take private vows and remained as missionaries within their secular and home obligations. She served as its first general custodian.
