= Encarnación (sculpting) =

A sculpting technique employed by the Spanish artist Juan Martínez Montañés in the 17th-century (Baroque Period), it is used to create lifelike sculptures, hence the name (which translates to English as 'incarnation' or 'bringing to life'), which after carving and drying for 6 months are painted, varnished and sanded. These steps are repeated several times until a lifelike glow is achieved.
