= Adolfo R. Carrillo =

Mexican journalist and writer (1855–1926)

- Born: Adolfo Rogaciano Carrillo Ramos; 27 September 1855; Sayula, Jalisco
- Died: 23 August 1926 (aged 70); Los Angeles, California
- Occupations: Journalist, short story writer
- Parent(s): Eutimia Ramos, Amado Carrillo
- Writing career
- Pen name: Bum-bum Filintos; Philintus; S. Q. y Z. Triboulet; Ursus X.X.X.
- Period: 1875–1926
- Notable works: El carnaval de México en 1879 (The Carnival of Mexico in 1879) (1879); Recuerdos de un emigrado (Memories of an Emigrant) (1883); Memorias de Sebastián Lerdo de Tejada (Memoirs of Sebastián Lerdo de Tejada) (1889/1890); Memorias del Marqués de San Basilisco (Memoirs of the Marquis of St. Basilisk) (1897); Cuentos californianos (Californian Tales) (circa 1922)

Adolfo Rogaciano Carrillo Ramos (27 September 1855 – 23 August 1926) was a Mexican anti-Porfirista journalist and short story writer.

== Works ==
- Memorias de Sebastián Lerdo de Tejada (1889/1890)
- Memorias del Marqués de San Basilisco (1897) (reissued 2024)
- Cuentos californianos (circa 1922). A collection of 19 short stories are the following:
  - "El Budha de Chun-Sin" (The Buddha of Chun-Sin)
  - "Oro y sangre" (Gold and Blood)
  - "El sacrilegio" (The Sacrilege)
  - "Juana 'la Loca'" (Joanna "the Mad")
  - "La última cena" (The Last Supper)
  - "El murciélago" (The Bat)
  - "Joaquín Murrieta"
  - "El ópalo del padre Rueda" (Father Rueda's Opal)
  - "El resucitado" (The Risen One)
  - "Amores trágicos" (Tragic Loves)
  - "La Virgen del Carmelo" (The Virgin of Carmel)
  - "Le père Gregoire"
  - "Chispas de oro" (Sparks of Gold)
  - "Los primeros gambusinos" (The First Prospectors)
  - "Un moderno père Goriot" (A Modern Père Goriot)
  - "Los espectros de San Luis Rey" (The Ghosts of San Luis Rey)
  - "El hombre invisible" (The Invisible Man)
  - "El primer insurgente" (The First Insurgent)
  - "La hija del contrabandista" (The Smuggler's Daughter)
