= Coat of arms of Mexico City =

Coat of Arms of Mexico City

The Coat of arms of Mexico City (Spanish: Escudo de la Ciudad de México, lit. "state shield of Mexico City") is a symbol of the Free and Sovereign State of Mexico City in Mexico.

== Symbolism ==
The coat of arms of Mexico City is a field azure (blue) with a castle with three movable bridges from the sides and from the top without reaching the castle supporting two lions facing each other and leaning on the castle, all of gold; border of gold with ten leaves of green pads from prickly pear cactus.

=== Historical coats ===
The historical symbol is used by all successive regimes in different forms.

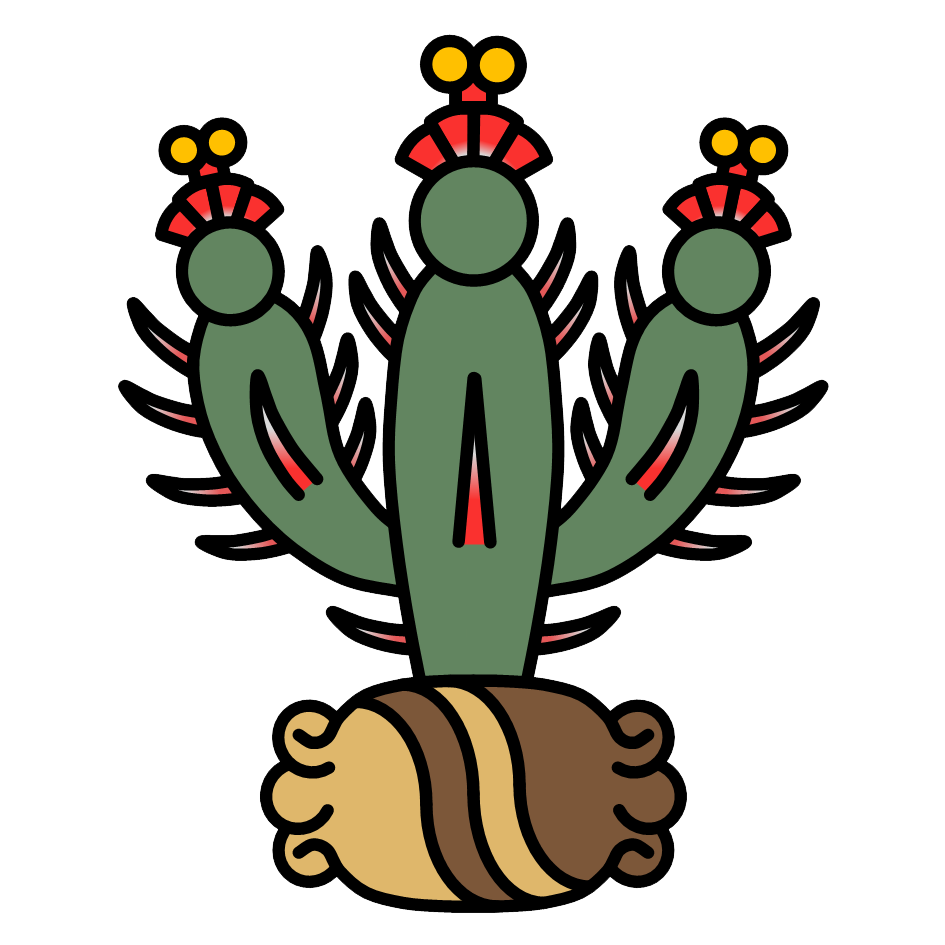
Coat of arms from 1325

Coat of arms from 1534.

Coat of arms from 1767.

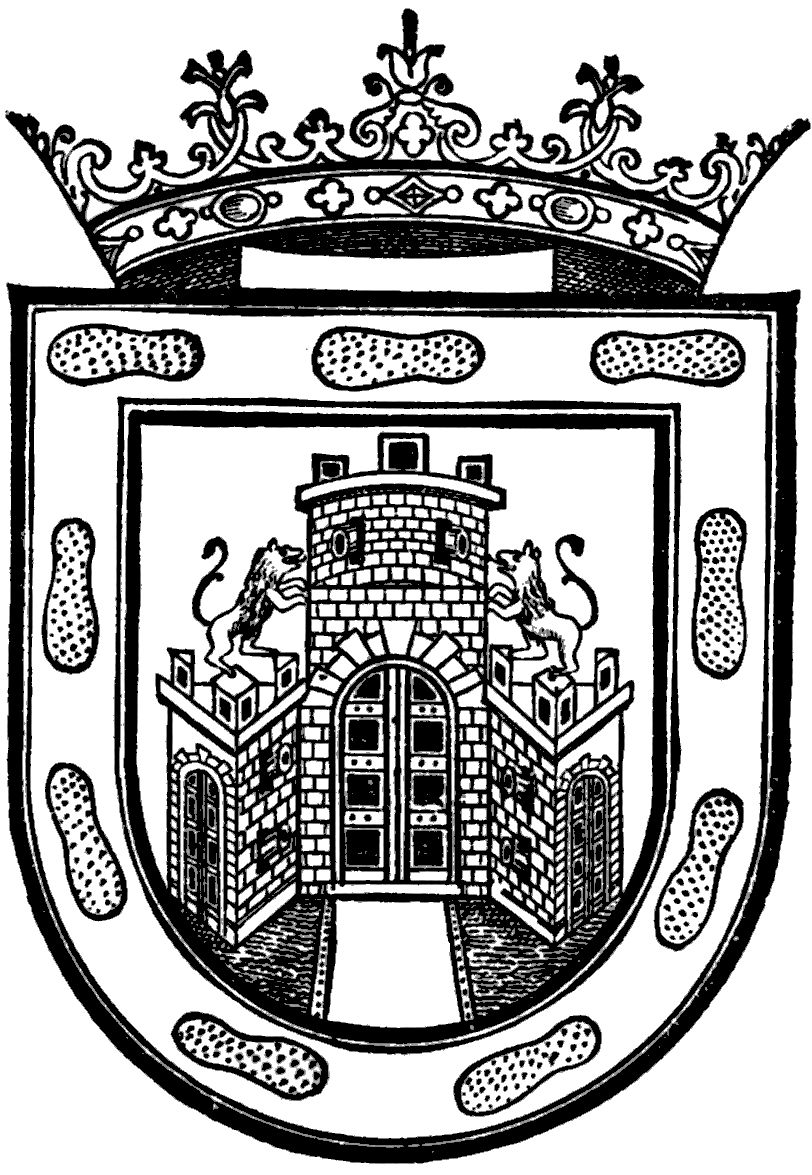
Coat of arms from 1810.

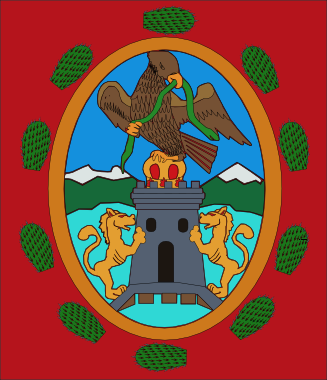
Coat of arms from 1887.

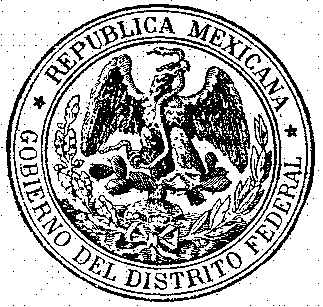
Coat of arms from 1901.

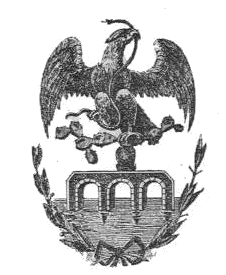
Coat of arms from 1952.

Coat of arms from 1986.

Coat of arms from 1998.

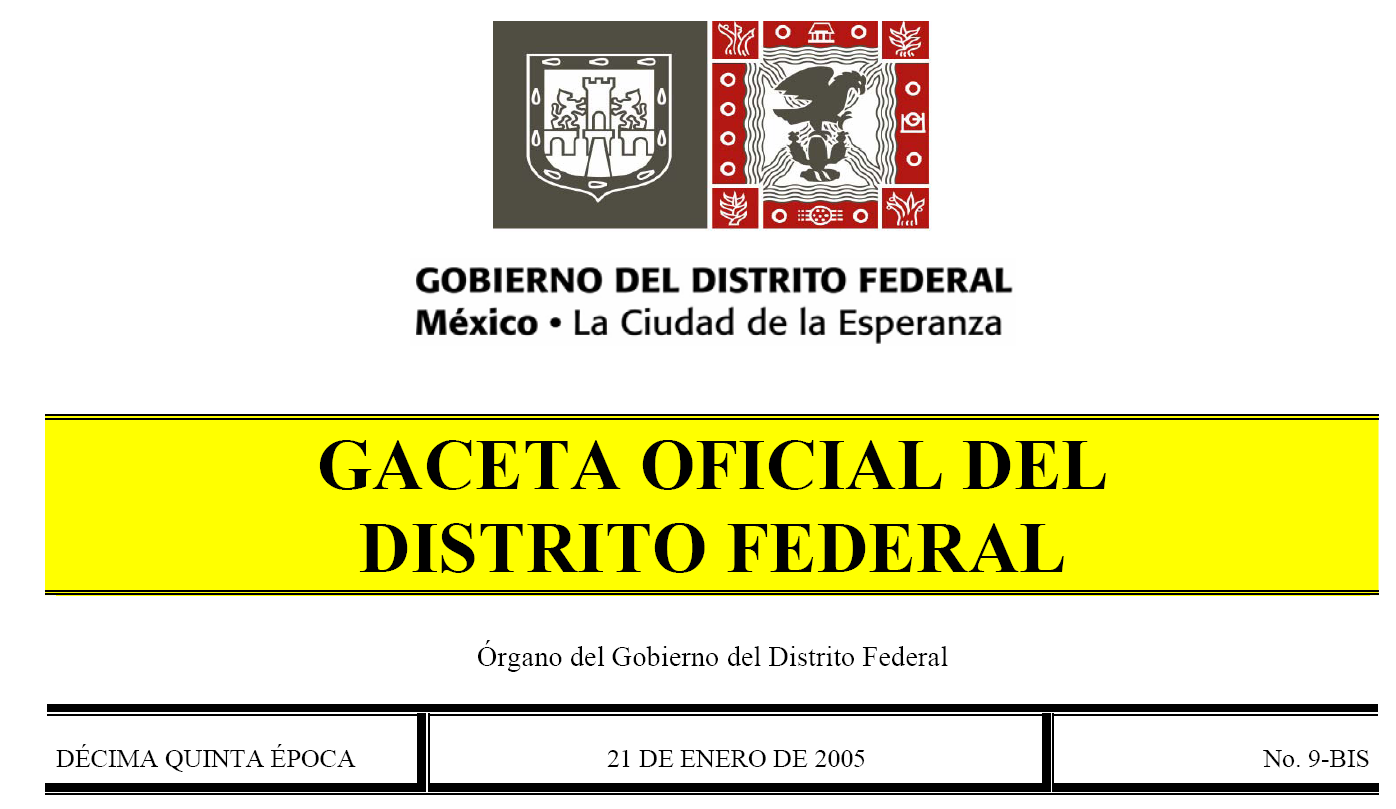
Coat of arms from 2005.

Coat of arms from 2020.

=== Others ===
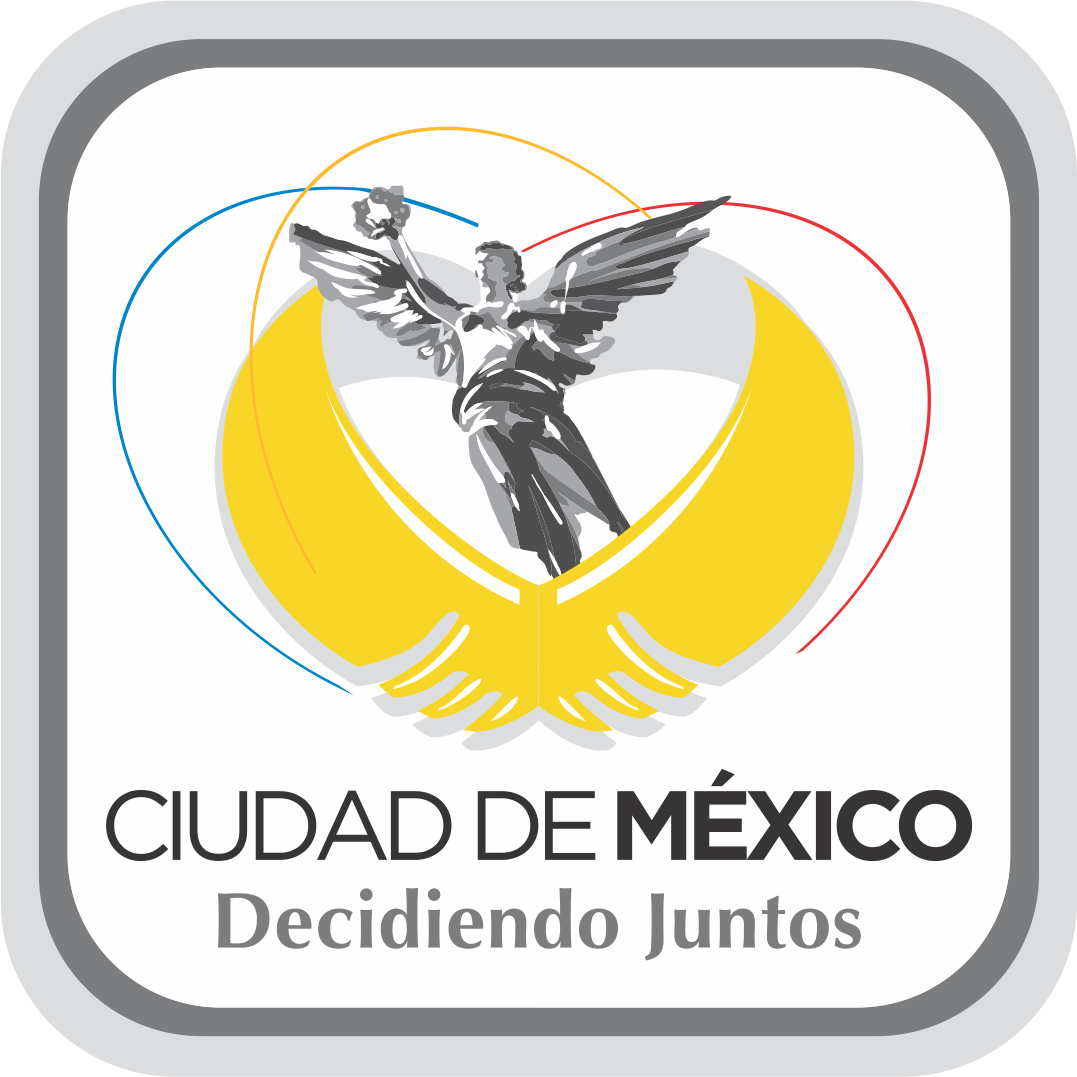
Symbol from 2012–2018

Symbol from 2018–2024

Symbol from 2024–2030

== See also ==
- Mexico City
- Coat of arms of Mexico
