= Academia Mexicana de Genealogía y Heráldica =

Cultural institution

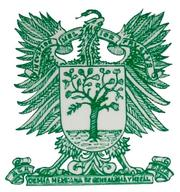
- Established: 15 May 1943
- Location: Mexico City
- President: Salvador de Pinal-Icaza y Enríquez

The Academia Mexicana de Genealogía y Heráldica (Mexican Academy of Genealogy and Heraldry) is a cultural institution based in Mexico City, Mexico.

== History ==
The Academia Mexicana de Genealogía y Heráldica has its origin in the Academia Hispanoamericana de Genealogía y Herádica, established in Mexico City in 1921 by José Ignacio Dávila Garibi; with a difficult beginning, the institution had to be reorganized in 1941 but without much success.

Finally, on 15 May 1943 the Academia Mexicana de Genealogía y Heráldica was founded by José Ignacio Dávila Garibi with a mission to promote the studies on Genealogy and Heraldry through research, education and exhibition. The motive in founding the Academy was twofold: to raise the professional status of the researcher by establishing a sound system of training and expert judgment in the sciences of Genealogy and Heraldry attaining an appropriate standard of excellence, and to publish some essays in its main publication: Memorias. Behind this concept was the desire to encourage appreciation and interest in the already mentioned sciences.

It's the only Mexican institution in the sciences of Genealogy and Heraldry which belongs to the Confédération Internationale de Généalogie et d'Héraldique and to the Confederación Iberoamericana de ciencias Genealógica y Heráldica.

=== Founding members ===
The founding members were five: José Ignacio Dávila Garibi, President; Guilermo Romo Célis, Secretary General; Gonzalo Torres Martínez, Treasurer; Luis García Remus and Manuel Septién y Septién, and allowed for a total membership of 24 Numbered Academicians and some others non-numbered, correspondent and honorary members. The institution was reorganized in 1957.

== Presidents ==
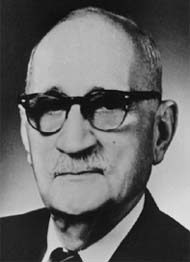
José Ignacio Dávila Garibi, founder and 1st President of the Academia Mexicana de Genealogía y Heráldica.

President	Served
José Ignacio Dávila Garibi (1888–1981)	1943–1981
Guilermo Romo Célis (1912–1988)	1981–1984
Teodoro Amerlinck y Zirión (1908–2007)	1984–1991
Jorge Víctor Barbabosa y Torres	1991–2003
Adolfo de Sentis y Ortega (1925–2012), Count de Guadalupe del Peñasco	2003–2007
Salvador de Pinal-Icaza y Enríquez	2007 – present

== Premio Academia Mexicana de Genealogía y Heráldica ==
Premio Academia Mexicana de Genealogía y Heráldica
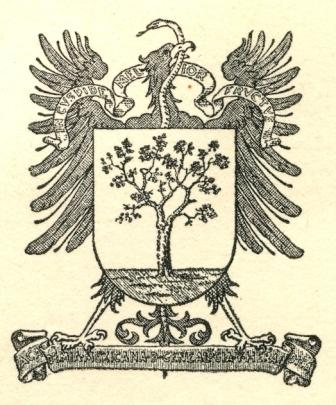
- Awarded for: Excellence in achievements on published studies on genealogy and heraldry

The Premio Academia Mexicana de Genealogía y Heráldica is a prize established in 1985 by Guillermo Romo Célis (1912–1988) as a recognition of excellence in achievements on published studies on genealogy and heraldry, and it is given during the celebration of the International Congress of Genealogical and Heraldic Sciences.

Among others, this prize has been granted to:

- 1995 – Yves de La Goublaye de Ménorval (Kraków, Poland)
- 2002 – Francisco Javier de Castaños y Cañedo (Dublin, Ireland)
- 2006 – Ramiro Ordóñez Jonama (St Andrews, Scotland)

== Genealogical records ==
This institution, in collaboration with the Church of Jesus Christ of Latter-day Saints had contributed during the microfilming process of the main Mexican Catholic Church records (1953–71), archiving the amount of 72,000 film rolls (86 million pages). Thanks to a contract among the aforementioned institutions, a whole copy of these microfilms were kept in possession of the Academia Mexicana de Genealogía y Heráldica; nowadays such copies are located in the Archivo General de la Nación (Mexico City), and are available for public consultation under the guidelines and regulations of the same institution.

The AMGyH had signed collaboration documents with the historical archives of the Mexican states of Aguascalientes (2006) and Michoacán (2007) to contribute with the digitalization and preservation of their most valuable files.

== Publications ==
The Academia Mexicana de Genealogía y Heráldica published a series of Memorias through two periods: 8 volumes on the first one (1945–57); and 17 volumes from 1957 until 2005.

== Main references ==
- Academia Mexicana de Genealogía y Heráldica (1949). Memorias. Tomo V. Mexico City: Academia Mexicana de Genealogía y Heráldica, pp. 15, 79, 103, 141, 185.
- Academia Mexicana de Genealogía y Heráldica (1986). Memorias. Tomo V. Mexico City: Academia Mexicana de Genealogía y Heráldica, pp. 29–32, 35.
- Academia Mexicana de Genealogía y Heráldica (1990). Memorias. Tomo XIV. Mexico City: Academia Mexicana de Genealogía y Heráldica, pp. 226–228, 239–243.
- Academia Mexicana de Genealogía y Heráldica (2000). Memorias. Tomo XVI. Mexico City: Academia Mexicana de Genealogía y Heráldica, pp. 26–45.
- Academia Mexicana de Genealogía y Heráldica (2005). Memorias. Tomo XVII. Mexico City: Academia Mexicana de Genealogía y Heráldica, pp. 1–11.
- Álvarez, José Rogelio (1978). Enciclopedia de México. Volúmen 5. Mexico City: Enciclopedia de México, pp. 256–257.
- Utah Genealogical Association (1971). Genealogical Journal. Vol. 15–17. Salt Lake City: Utah Genealogical Association, pp. 160–170.
