= Coat of arms of Puebla =

Coat of Arms of Puebla

The Coat of arms of Puebla (Spanish: Escudo de Puebla, lit. "state shield of Puebla") is the official emblem of the Free and Sovereign State of Puebla.

== Symbolism ==
The coat of arms is divided into four quarters. Among these are 12 unequal parts, with one in the lower right quarter representing an industry. At the center, a shield reminiscent of the one granted by the Spanish Crown to the city of Puebla during its foundation is displayed. This shield bears the inscription "May 5, 1862." Surrounding the shield is a white border with the phrase "United in time, in effort, in justice, and in hope."

Atop the shield are the profiles of four mountains: Citlaltépetl (Pico de Orizaba), Popocatépetl, Iztaccíhuatl, and Matlacuéitl (Malinche). Encircling the mountains are two feathered serpents with corn cob tails, holding the mask of Tlaloc over the peaks. The serpents, marked with human footprints, each carry four suns. Below this imagery, a ribbon bears the inscription "Free and Sovereign State of Puebla".

== History ==
Governor Alfredo Toxqui Fernández de Lara ordered the design for the people of Puebla as an element of identification that would summarize the history of the state. On 18 August, 1977, the governor decreed the creation of the coat of arms and since then, it has represented the entity.

=== Historical coats ===
The symbol is used by all successive regimes in different forms.

Coat of arms from 1824 to 1977.

== See also ==
- Puebla
- Coat of arms of Mexico
