= Enciclopedia de México =

National encyclopedia of Mexico

Enciclopedia de México is a national encyclopedia of Mexico.

A first edition, in 10 volumes, was published from 1968, with editor Gutierre Tibón.

A later edition was published from the late 1970s in 12 volumes, edited by José Rogelio Álvarez (es) The encyclopedia has a vast array of articles including geology and landforms, fauna and flora, human migration, pre-Conquest ethnicity, anthropology and archeology, and biographical coverage, and it is the most comprehensive encyclopedia on Mexico to date.
