= Utah Genealogical Association =

The Utah Genealogical Association (UGA) is a non-profit genealogical society charted by the State of Utah on December 1, 1971.

== Publications ==
The UGA currently publishes a quarterly journal, Crossroads which was preceded by the Genealogical Journal. Back copies are available to members through the website.

In 1991, the Genealogical Journal published a pair of articles detailing the broad extent of Gustave Anjou's fraudulent genealogies.

== See also ==
- Utah Genealogical Association website
