= Ramiro Villaseñor y Villaseñor =

Mexican bibliographer and historian (1911–1991)

- Born: April 25, 1911; Guadalajara, Jalisco
- Died: April 9, 1991 (aged 79); Guadalajara
- Occupations: bibliographer, historian
- Years active: 1950–1988
- Spouse: María Guadalupe Béjar Díaz

Ramiro Villaseñor y Villaseñor (25 April 1911 – 9 April 1991), was a Mexican bibliographer and historian.

== Biography ==
His parents were engineer–architect and lawyer Arnulfo Villaseñor Carrillo and Carmen Leonor Villaseñor. He studied Elementary School in Guadalajara. His subsequent training was obtained in a self-taught way, since he did not continue with high school studies or finish the commerce studies that he had begun.

He inherited much of his father's personal library. The spontaneous researcher in archives and libraries, from a young age began to frequent gatherings in cafes and to visit the Public Library of the State of Jalisco, located since 1861 at Calle Liceo 60, and then, from February 1975 at 849 16 de Septiembre Avenue (close to the Parque Agua Azul). He also frequented the Biblioteca Central (Central Library), located at 679 González Ortega Street, north of downtown Guadalajara. He toured the city of Guadalajara on foot, talked to the inhabitants, and visited small, informal eateries and street-food stalls.

As a young man he read numerous books, including some Latin classics; also, Historia particular del estado de Jalisco (Particular History of the State of Jalisco), by Luis Pérez Verdía, Análisis de la Reforma (Analysis of the Reform), by Agustín Rivera, as well as the works by Fyodor Dostoevsky.

He prepared bibliographic files and records of the books that deal with the State of Jalisco, Guadalajara, its history, characters, traditions. Befriended and learned from Adalberto Navarro Sánchez.

== Some of his works ==
- Bibliografía de José López Portillo y Rojas, 1950 (Bibliography of José López Portillo y Rojas)
- Bibliografía del Ayuntamiento de Guadalajara, 1955 (Bibliography of the City Council of Guadalajara)
- Bibliografía general de Jalisco, 1958 (General bibliography of Jalisco)
- Historia de las fuentes de Guadalajara, 1970 (History of the fountains of Guadalajara)
- Ignacio Cumplido. Impresor y editor jalisciense del federalismo en México, 1974 (Ignacio Cumplido. Jaliscan printer and publisher of federalism in Mexico)
- Urbano Sanromán. Primer editor de Guadalajara y del federalismo. Estudio bibliográfico de su imprenta, 1977 (Urbano Sanromán. First editor of Guadalajara and federalism. Bibliographic study of his printing press)
- Bibliografía de discursos, informes y memorias de los gobernadores del estado de Jalisco, 1978 (Bibliography of speeches, states of the state addresses, and memoirs of the governors of the State of Jalisco)
- Los primeros federalistas de Jalisco, 1821–1834, 1982 (The first federalists of Jalisco, 1821–1834)
- Epigrafía del Panteón de Belén, 1985 (Epigraphy of the Panteón de Belén)
- Las calles históricas de Guadalajara, 1986 (The historic streets of Guadalajara)

== See also ==
- Adalberto Navarro Sánchez
