= St. Vincent's Seminary (Germantown) =

Coordinates: 40.04230°N 75.16669°W

St. Vincent's Seminary in Philadelphia, Pennsylvania, is a former seminary of the Congregation of the Mission, established to train priests for the Eastern United States.

== History ==
The Vincentians arrived in the United States in 1816, among the first groups of Catholic clergy to serve in the then-missionary territory of the United States. Their first foundation was in Baltimore, Maryland.

One goal of the Congregation since its founding has been the training of clergy, both for themselves and for the local diocese, at their own expense when necessary. Thus, after the establishment of an independent Province for the United States in 1835, the growing number of local bishops in the country began to request their help in running seminaries they had founded but did not have the means, either financially or in terms of manpower, to operate. In this way, members of the Congregation arrived in Philadelphia in 1841 at the invitation of Francis Patrick Kenrick, the Bishop of Philadelphia, to run St. Charles Borromeo Seminary. A part of Kenrick's invitation had been the offer to allow a house of formation for the Congregation to be opened in the diocese.

The Vincentians served there until the appointment of the Superior of the school, Thaddeus Amat y Brusi, as the first Bishop of Los Angeles in 1852. At that point, dealing with their own shortage of personnel, and also being dissatisfied with the organization of the school under the bishop, they decided to withdraw from the seminary.

In 1851 the Congregation had acquired land in Germantown Township, then still a rural suburb of Philadelphia, which was to become the center of their operations on the Eastern seaboard, and there opened the Parish of St. Vincent de Paul. In 1868 it was decided to move the formation program for new members of the Congregation from Missouri to Germantown. This included both the novitiate and the scholasticate (the college-level facility), which came to become known as St. Vincent Seminary, which were established adjacent to the parish church. It then operated for over a century at the location.

== Current status ==
Due to the dwindling numbers of students, the seminary was closed as an educational institution during the late 20th century. The building has been converted to a care facility for the aged members of the Eastern Province of the Congregation, as well as serving as the headquarters of the province.
