= Fernando Muñoz Altea =

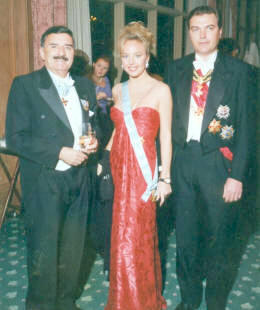
Fernando Muñoz Altea (left) with the Duke and Duchess of Castro.

Fernando Muñoz Altea (22 November 1925 – 2 March 2018) was the King of Arms of the Royal House of Bourbon-Two Sicilies. He was a Spanish/Mexican historian, specialised in the study of the aristocratic European colonial families of the Americas. Muñoz Altea was born in Madrid (Spain) on November 22, 1925. He died in Mexico City on March 2, 2018. Don Fernando Muñoz Altea was considered the "Dean of the Kings of Arms", since due to his seniority in the trade, he was one of the very few and genuine Kings of Arms left in the world in his time. The extraordinary quality of his genealogical certifications and of his heraldic designs, which he carried out personally, is internationally renowned.

== King of Arms ==
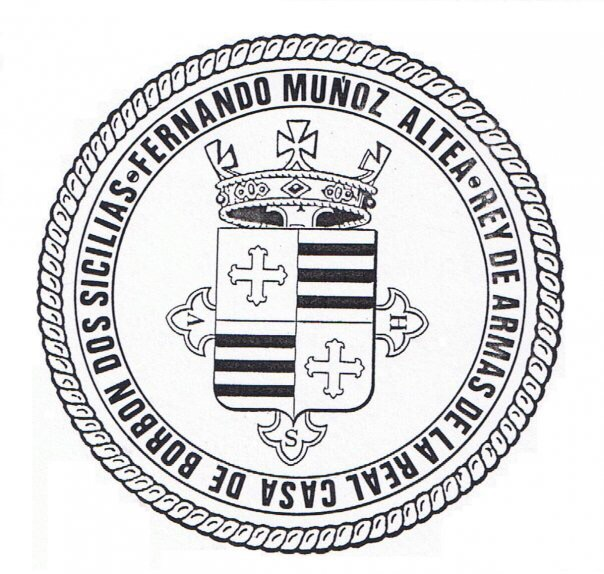
Seal of the King of Arms of the Royal House of Bourbon-Two Sicilies

Muñoz Altea was introduced to the study of heraldry, genealogy and nobility by Don José de Rújula y Ochotorena, Marqués de Ciadoncha, Dean of the Corps of Chronicler King of Arms (Cuerpo de Cronista Rey de Armas), and by Don Julio de Atienza y Navajas, Barón de Cobos de Belchite, author of the well-known work “Nobiliario Español”. Both became his mentors and friends. On 10 November 1962 Muñoz Altea was first appointed King of Arms of the Royal House by Prince Ranieri, Duke of Castro, Head of the French Branch of the Royal House. The Former Kingdom of Sicily did not have actual heralds (to grant coats of arms and issue certificates of nobility) in recent times, but rather a Commission for Titles of Nobility based in Naples until 1861. This commission concerned itself with the administration of certain nobiliary institutions, recognition of titles of nobility and heraldry. The appointment of the King of Arms by the Prince Ranieri, Duke of Castro continues this tradition. Certifications of arms and certificates of nobility issued by Muñoz Altea's office in the name of the Royal House are, in effect, documents of a dynastic nature. Muñoz Altea was King of Arms of Prince Carlo, Duke of Castro, not of Prince Pedro, Duke of Calabria. In addition to his office as King of Arms, Muñoz Altea was delegate of the Sacred Military Constantinian Order of Saint George in Mexico (Prince Carlo, Duke of Castro, branch)

== Historical work ==
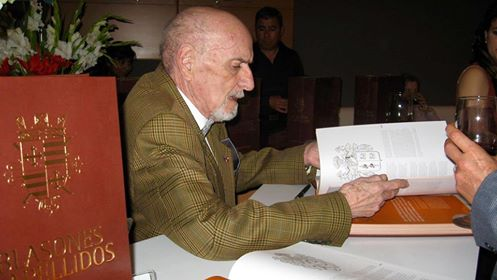
Fernando Muñoz Altea, signing a copy of Blasones y Apellidos.

Muñoz Altea is the author of several books, among them, the biographies of the 64 Viceroys of Mexico, The House of Los Pinos History (the Presidencial Residence of Mexico), The Biographies of the Signers of the Independence Act, “Los Virreyes de la Nueva España, Perfiles genealógico-biográficos” (Universidad Monteávila, Caracas, Venezuela 2013) and “Blasones y Apellidos”, first and second edition. Muñoz Altea has ordered and cataloged historic archives of many municipalities in Spain. Muñoz Altea was head of the historical section of the General Archive of Notaries of Mexico City (1981-1984), advisor to the Public Registry of Property and Commerce of Mexico City (1981-1984) and columnist for the Excelsior newspaper, with more than 7,000 articles on historical, biographical, genealogical topics and heraldic. He has given various conferences in Mexico, the United States, Spain and Japan, among other countries. He participated on different occasions, on Channel 2 of TELEVISA, about the origin of Hispanic surnames. Muñoz Altea was Numismatic advisor to the Bank of Mexico, regarding the design of the respective heraldic shields of the States of the Republic that bear on their reverse the commemorative coins of the Federation. He was the author of the CD "New Hispanic Titles granted to Mexicans, their descendants or residents in Mexico".

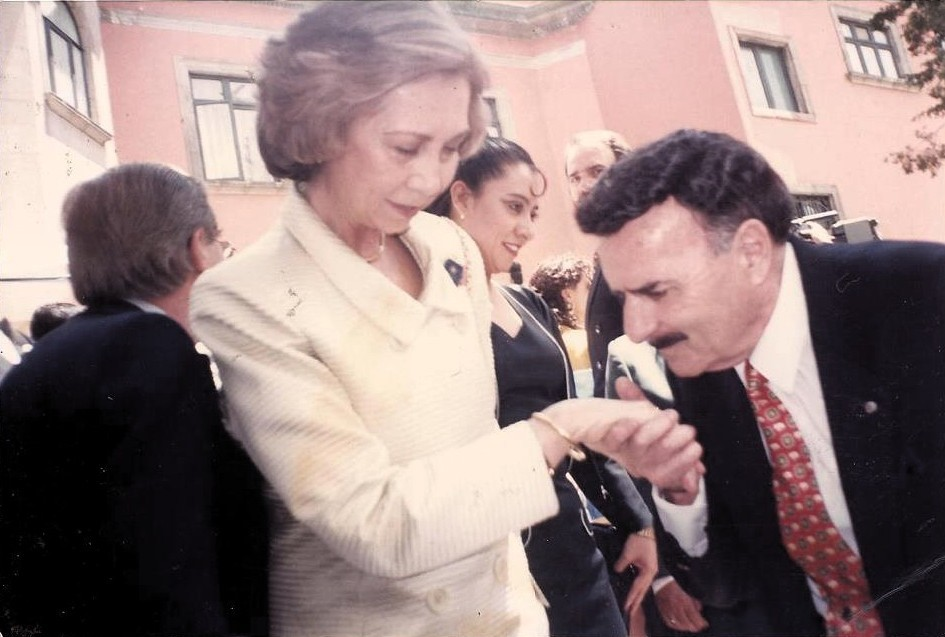
Fernando Muñoz Altea (right) and the Queen consort of Spain

== Distinctions ==
- Degree in History, Hermanos Maristas de Madrid in 1951
- King of Arms of the Royal House of Borbon Two Sicilies (Prince Carlo, Duke of Castro branch) since 1962
- Commander with plaque of the Sacred Military Constantinian Order of Saint George, delegate for Mexico
- Heraldic Advisor to the Cuban Association of the Sovereign Military Order of Malta
- Knight of the Mexican Legion of Honor in the eminent grade
- Consultant for the Mexican Mint House, Numismatic Division, for the commemorative emission of “Coins of the Federation” (2003)
- President “Ad Vitam” and founder of the Academia Mexicana de Genealogía y Heráldica (Mexican Academy for Genealogic and Heraldic Studies)
- Fiscal and cofounder of the Real Maestranza de Caballería de la Habana (Royal Cavalry of Havana) 2009.
- Grand Officer of the Order of the Star of Ethiopia.
- Judge of Arms and Knight of the Grand Cross of the Real Maestranza de Mérida, Yucatán (the latter was formed in Mexico, Archduke Andrés Salvador de Habsburgo being its President).
- Member, International Academy Our Lady of Montecarmelo (2004)
