= Portugal Rei de Armas =

- The arms of Portugal, used as the office insignia of the Portugal Rei de Armas
- Heraldic tradition: Portuguese
- Jurisdiction: Portugal
- Governing body: Cartório da Nobreza

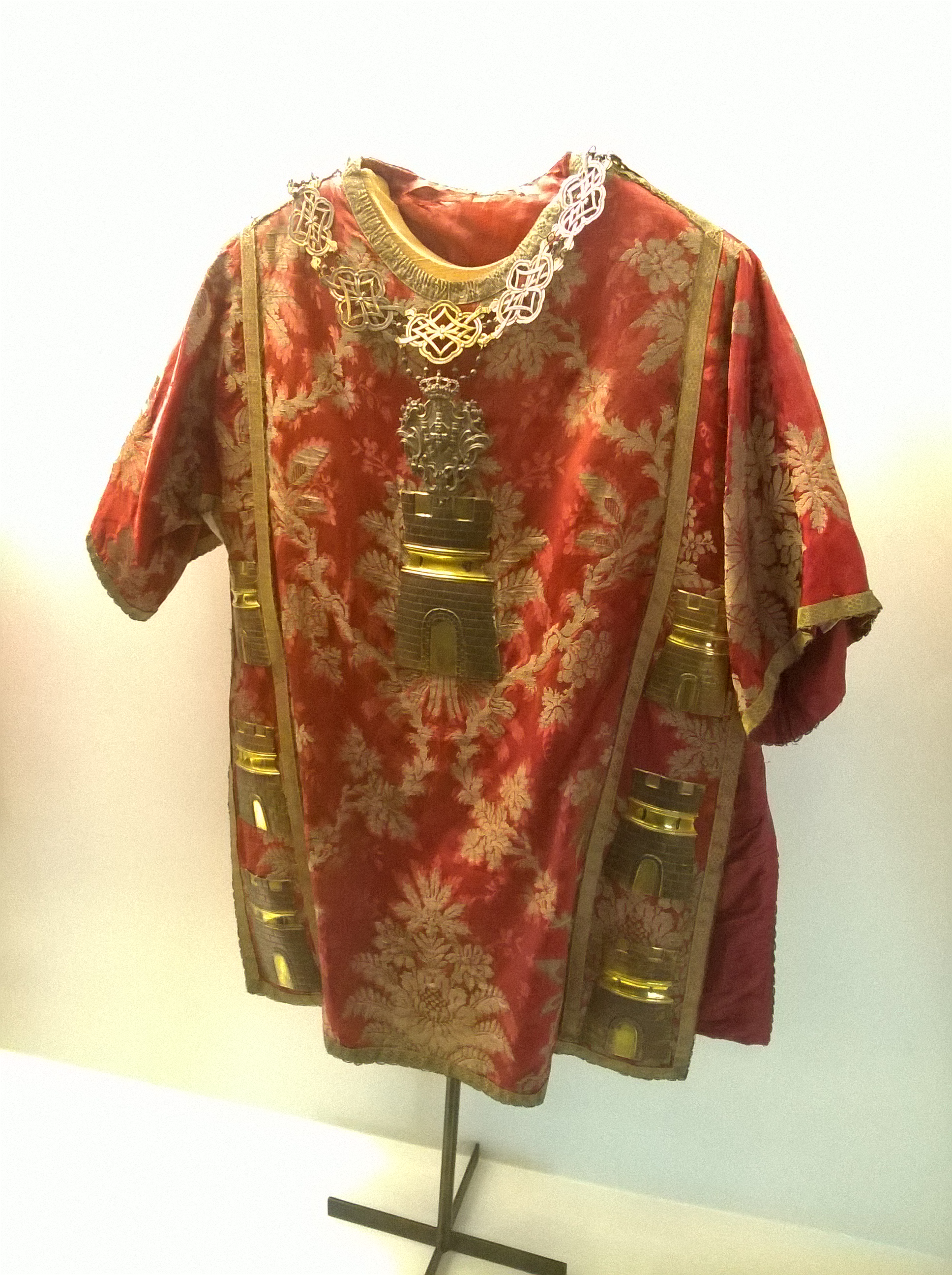
Tabard and collar of a Portuguese King of Arms in the 18th century.

Portugal Rei de Armas or Rei de Armas Portugal (Portuguese for "Portugal King of Arms") was the title of the main officer of arms of the Kingdom of Portugal. The office was established by King John I of Portugal, with its first holder being an Englishman named Harriet.

The office was restructured in the scope of the new law that reformed the Portuguese heraldry, decreed by King Manuel I in 1512. The office was abolished when the Portuguese Monarchy was replaced by the Republic in 1910.

Besides the principal Portugal Rei de Armas, there were two deputy kings of arms, the Rei de Armas Algarve (Algarve King of Arms) and the Rei de Armas Índia (India King of Arms). The titles of the kings of arms were taken from the three main parts of the dominions of the Crown of Portugal, that were then the Kingdom of Portugal, the Kingdom of Algarve and the Portuguese State of India. In 1807, the Rei de Armas Índia was retitled Rei de Armas América, África e Índia (America, Africa and India King of Arms), returning to the original title after the independence of Brazil, recognized by Portugal in 1825.

The kings of arms were assisted by three heralds (Arauto Lisboa, Arauto Silves and Arauto Goa) and by three pursuivants (Passavante Santarém, Passavante Lagos and Passavante Cochim). The titles of the heralds and pursuivants were taken from main cities and towns of Portugal (Lisbon and Santarém), the Algarve (Silves and Lagos) and the Portuguese India (Goa and Kochi). The Arauto Silves was later retitled Tavira.

== See also ==
- Portuguese heraldry
