= King of arms =

Rank of an officer of arms

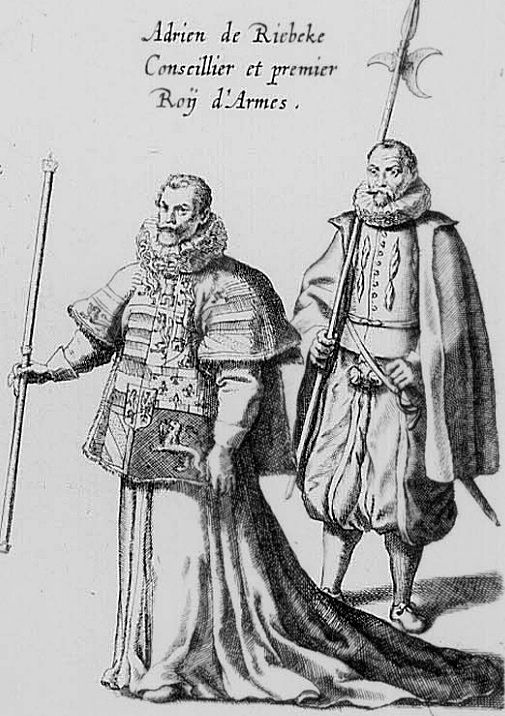
King during the solemn funeral of Albert VI of Austria

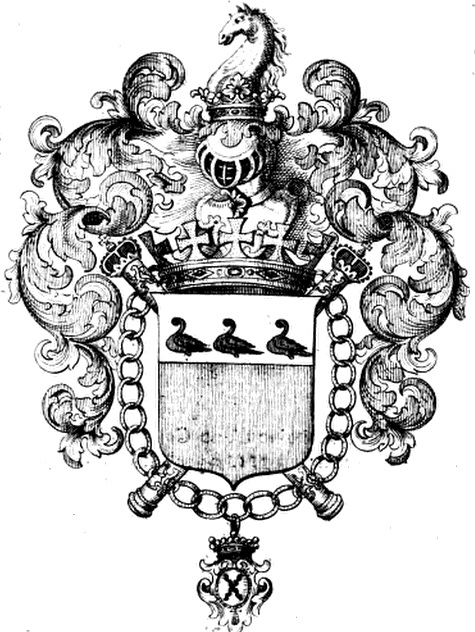
Louis d'Ursel was the King of Arms of Flanders

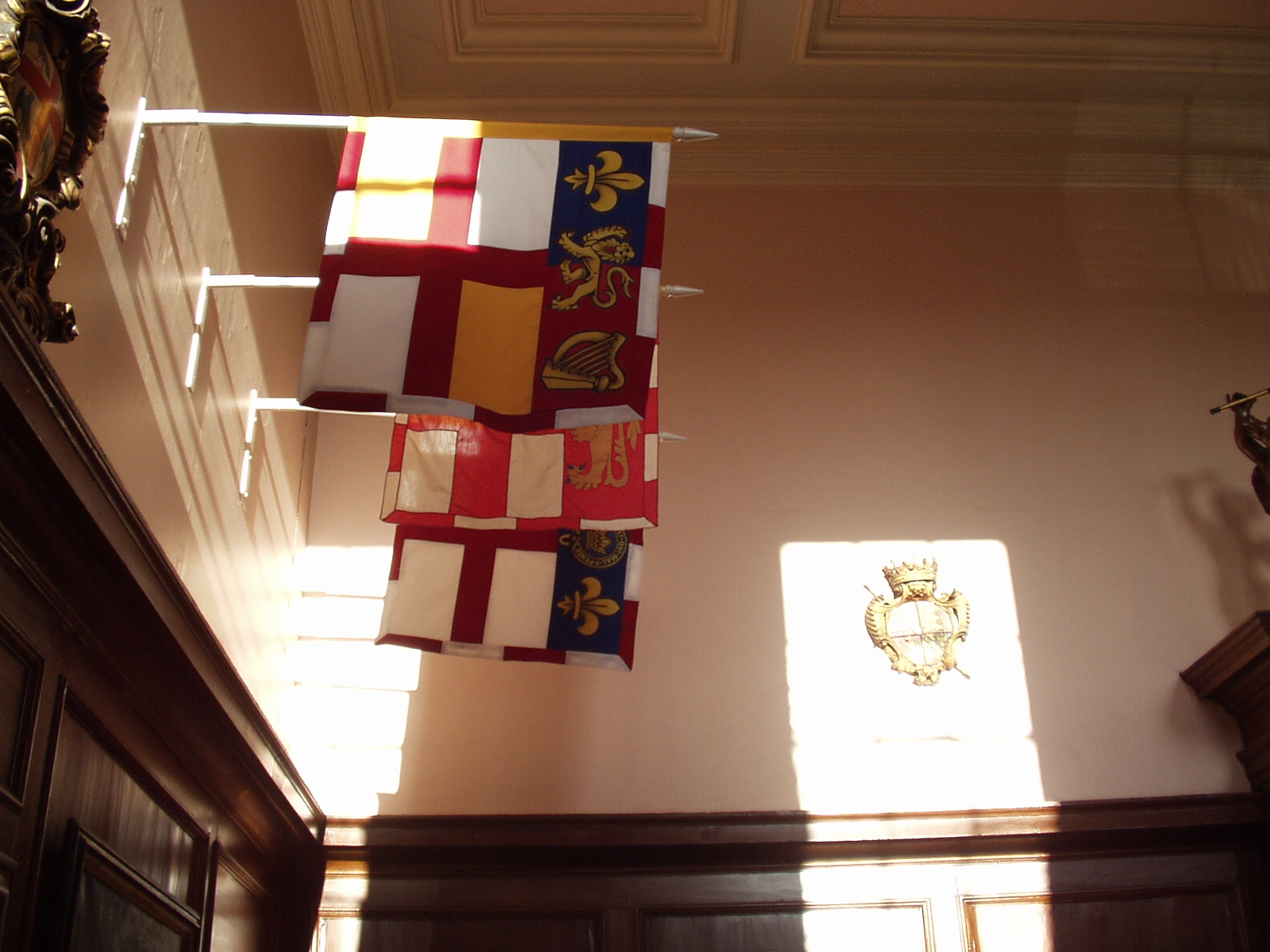
Banners of the arms of office of the three current English kings of arms. Visible are the banners of Norroy and Ulster King of Arms, Clarenceux King of Arms, and Garter Principal King of Arms.

King of arms is the senior rank of an officer of arms. In many heraldic traditions, only a king of arms has the authority to grant armorial bearings and sometimes certify genealogies and noble titles. In other traditions, the power has been delegated to other officers of similar rank.

== Heraldic duties ==
Crown of an English king of arms

In England, the authority to grant a coat of arms is subject to the formal approval of the Earl Marshal in the form of a warrant. In jurisdictions such as the Republic of Ireland the authority to grant armorial bearings has been delegated to a chief herald that serves the same purpose as the traditional king of arms. Canada also has a chief herald, though this officer grants arms on the authority of the governor general as the monarch's representative through the herald chancellor's direct remit. Scotland's only king of arms, the Lord Lyon, exercises the royal prerogative by direct delegation from the Crown and like the Chief Herald of Ireland and the old Ulster King of Arms needs no warrant from any other office bearer.

In the Kingdom of Spain, the power to certify coats of arms has been given to the Cronistas de Armas (chroniclers of arms).

The English and Scottish kings of arms are the only officers of arms to have a distinctive crown of office, used for ceremonial purposes such as at coronations (as opposed to peers, who instead wear a coronet). At the coronation of Queen Elizabeth II, the kings of arms used a crown trimmed with sixteen acanthus leaves alternating in height, and inscribed with the words Miserere mei Deus secundum magnam misericordiam tuam ('Have mercy upon me, O God, according to Thy great mercy'; Psalm 51). When this crown is shown in pictorial representations, nine leaves and the first three words are shown. Recently, a new crown has been made for the Lord Lyon, modelled on the Scottish Royal crown among the Honours of Scotland. This crown has removable arches which will be removed at coronations to avoid any hint of lèse majesté.

== Kings of arms and heraldic authorities of the United Kingdom ==
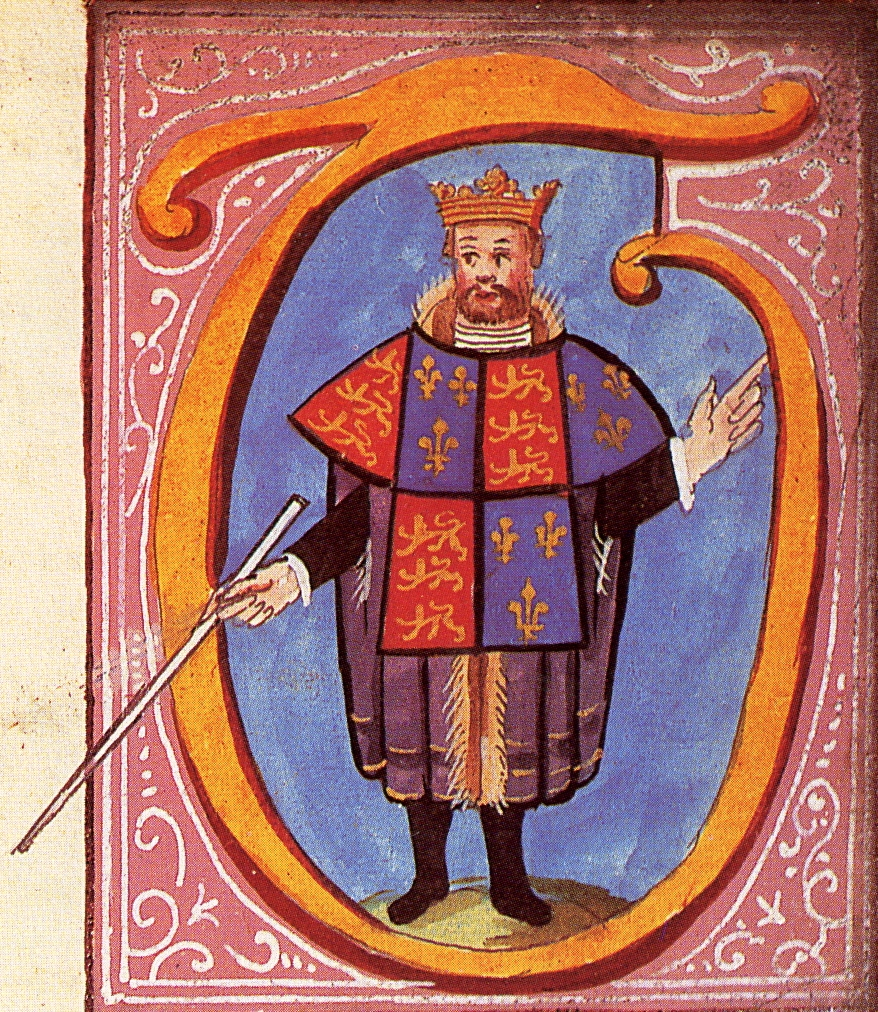
Thomas Hawley, Clarenceux King of Arms, wearing a tabard bearing the royal arms of England and holding a white staff of office

=== Kings of arms of England, Wales and Northern Ireland ===
- Garter Principal King of Arms
- Clarenceux King of Arms (England and Wales south of the Trent)
- Norroy and Ulster King of Arms (England north of the Trent and Northern Ireland)

=== Scottish king of arms ===
- Lord Lyon King of Arms

=== Orders of chivalry ===
Garter King of Arms is the herald of the Order of the Garter as is in Scotland Lord Lyon King of Arms the herald of the Order of the Thistle. The Norroy and Ulster King of Arms is the herald of the (now dormant) Order of St Patrick. Other British orders of chivalry have their own kings of arms:

- Bath King of Arms, for the Order of the Bath
- King of Arms of the Order of St Michael and St George
- King of Arms of the Order of the British Empire

== Chief or state heralds of Ireland and the Commonwealth ==
- Chief Herald of Canada
- Chief Herald of Ireland
- National Herald (formerly State Herald) of South Africa
- New Zealand Herald of Arms Extraordinary
- Chief Herald of Arms of Malta
Arms and batons of office of the Chief Herald of Canada

Coat of Arms of the Bureau of Heraldry of South Africa

Coat of arms of the Chief Herald of Malta

New Zealand Herald of Arms Extraordinary

== State Herald of Sweden ==
- The State Herald (Statsheraldiker) of Sweden is the head of a branch of the National Archives of Sweden

== Cronistas de Armas of Spain ==
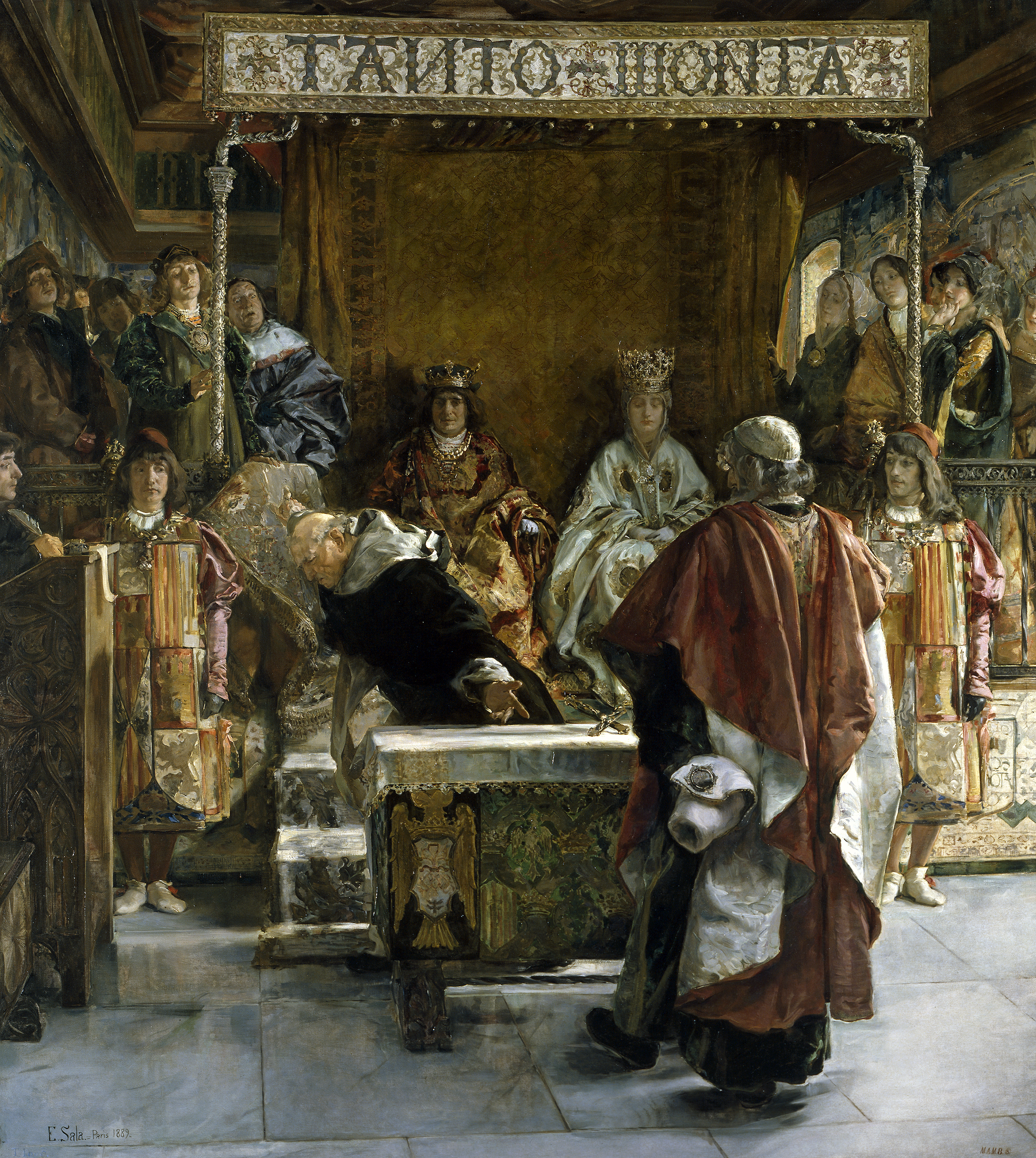
Kings of Arms appear in a painting where Grand Inquisitor Tomás de Torquemada in 1492 asks the Catholic Monarchs to issue the edict for expulsion of the Jews from Spain

- Cronistas Reyes de Armas

== Former kings of arms of Portugal ==
- Rei de Armas Portugal or Portugal Rei de Armas ('Portugal King of Arms')
- Rei de Armas Algarve ('Algarve King of Arms')
- Rei de Armas Índia ('India King of Arms')

== King of Arms of the Royal House of Bourbon Two Sicilies ==
- King of Arms Royal House of Bourbon Two Sicilies (Fernando Muñoz Altea, first appointed by the Prince Ranieri, Duke of Castro)

== See also ==
- Bureau of Heraldry
- Canadian Heraldic Authority
- College of Arms
- Court of the Lord Lyon
- Grant of arms
- Heraldic authority
