= Cronista Rey de Armas =

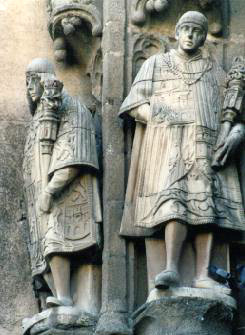
Heralds on the facade of San Juan de los Reyes church, Toledo, Spain

The Cronista Rey de Armas (Spanish for 'Chronicler King of Arms') in the Kingdoms of Spain was a civil servant who had the authority to grant armorial bearings. Currently this is no longer an office in Spain. The office of the King of Arms in Spain originated from those of the heralds (heraldos). In the early days of heraldry; anyone could bear arms, which led to disputes between individuals and families. These disputes were originally settled by the king, in the case of a dispute between nobles, or by a lower ranked official when the dispute involved non-nobles. Eventually, the task of settling these disputes was passed on to officers called heralds who were originally responsible for setting up tournaments and carrying messages between nobles.

The Spanish Cronista de Armas heraldic office dates back to the 16th century. Prior to that, heralds were usually named after provinces and non-capital cities, whilst reyes de armas were named after the Spanish kingdoms. Various chroniclers of arms were named for Spain, Castile, León, Frechas, Seville, Córdoba, Murcia, Granada (created in 1496 to honor the reunification of Spain), Estella, Viana, Navarre, Catalonia, Sicily, Aragon, Naples, Toledo, Valencia and Mallorca. While these appointments were not hereditary, at least fifteen Spanish families produced more than one herald each in the past 500 years (compared to about the same number for England, Scotland and Ireland collectively). The Spanish Cronistas had judicial powers in matters of noble titles. They also served as a registration office for pedigrees and grants of arms.

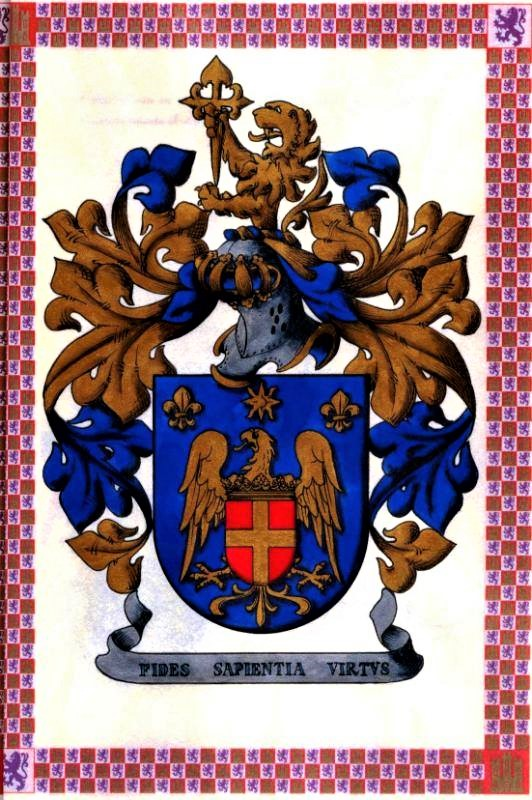
Arms of Eduardo Madrid Brillantes registered by the Cronista of Castile and León, Don Alfonso Ceballos-Escalera y Gil-Marques of La Floresta

The post of King of Arms took several forms and eventually settled on a Corps of Chronicler King of Arms (Cuerpo de Cronista Rey de Armas), which was headed by an elder or dean (decano). It usually consisted of four officers and two assistants or undersecretaries that acted as witnesses to documents. The entire corps wore a distinctive uniform. The corps was considered part of the royal household and was generally responsible to the Master of the King's Stable, an important position in the Middle Ages.

Appointments to the Corps of King of Arms were made by the King or reigning Queen. These appointments were for life and while not intended to be hereditary, often went from father to son or other close family member. The Spanish heralds had other duties that pertained to matters of protocol and often acted as royal messengers and emissaries. They could, and can, make arrangements for areas currently or previously under the rule of the Spanish crown. The precise functions and duties of the King of Arms were clearly defined by the declarations of several Kings and are still in force today.

In modern times the Corps of Chronicler King of Arms went through several changes. Important changes were made in 1915. The office was abolished in 1931 and restored in 1947–1951. The last Chronicler Kings of Arms appointed by the Spanish Ministry of Justice, Don Vicente de Cadenas y Vicent, died in 2005.

== Castile and León ==
The government of the autonomous community of Castile and León appointed Don Alfonso de Ceballos-Escalera y Gila, Marques de la Floresta, as Chronicler of Arms for Castile and León. Formerly, everything that the Spanish heralds did had to be reviewed and approved by the Ministry of Justice for it to be valid. However, the legislation of Castile and León established the Chronicler of Arms of Castile and León as the modern equivalent of the ancient King of Arms of the ancient Kingdom of Castile and Leon, with rights to all the traditional powers and competences pertaining to this office.
