= Vicente de Cadenas y Vicent =

Spanish civil servant

Coat of arms of Vicente de Cadenas y Vicent.

Vicente de Cadenas y Vicent (29 April 1915 – 21 December 2005) was a Spanish historian and genealogist. He was the last Cronista Rey de Armas ("Chronicler King of Arms") of the Kingdom of Spain before the institution was abolished.

== Biography ==
A native of Madrid, Spain, Cadenas was born on 29 April 1915, the son of Francisco de Cadenas y Gaztañaga and Vicenta Vicent y Nogués. Beginning in 1932, he studied the fields of history and journalism, at the University of Madrid. He maintained dual professions as both the Chronicler of Arms and as a journalist. He was for many years a member of the Deputation of the Constantinian Order, of which he was Secretary and which he joined in 1960 upon the succession of the Infante D. Alfonso as Grand Master.

Cadenas founded the Asociación de Hidalgos a Fuero de España in 1954 to obtain the recognition of the untitled nobility(nobleza llana). In 1953 he founded the review Hidalguía (with the particular aim of challenging false genealogies, fake titles and pseudo orders of chivalry) and the Instituto Internacional de Genealogía y Heráldica. The following year he founded the Instituto Luis de Salazar y Castro and in the following years the Colegio Mayor Marqués de la Ensenada, the Casasolar Santo Duque de Gandía, and the Casa Quinta Vita Natural Durante, each of which were dependent on the Association of Hidalgos.

He also organized two meetings of the International Congress of Genealogical and Heraldic Sciences in Madrid (1955 and 1982) The 15th Congress met in Madrid from 19 to 25 September in 1982 under the presidency of His Royal Highness Infante Carlos, Duke of Calabria (a cousin to King Juan Carlos I of Spain who opened the meeting) with Vicente de Cadenas serving as one of three vice presidents.

He published books and articles on historical themes as well as heraldry, genealogy, chivalric orders and documentary sciences. Between 1976 and 1991, Vicente wrote articles on three of the four Spanish military orders: the Order of Alcántara, the Order of Calatrava, and the Order of Santiago. Actas del último consejo nacional de Falange Española de las J.O.N.S. (Salamanca, 18-19-IV-1937) y algunas noticias referentes a la Jefatura Nacional de Prensa y Propaganda, was a study of the last meeting of the Falange Española de las Juntas de Ofensiva Nacional-Sindicalista following the death of its founder José Antonio Primo de Rivera. Vicente reviewed the circumstances which led the Falange Española de las Juntas de Ofensiva Nacional-Sindicalista to fall under the control of Francisco Franco and the use he made of the movement. He wrote a multi-volume study of the life and achievements of the Emperor Charles V (who was also, King Charles I of Spain).

== Publications ==
- El saco de Roma de 1527 por el ejercito de Carlos V. Madrid: Hidalguía. 1974. ISBN 978-8430060481.
- Actas del último consejo nacional de Falange Española de las J.O.N.S. (Salamanca, 18-19-IV-1937) y algunas noticias referentes a la Jefatura Nacional de Prensa y Propaganda. Madrid: [s.n.] 1975. ISBN 978-8440085481.
- Fundamentos de heráldica : (ciencia del blasón). Madrid: Hidalguía. 1975. ISBN 978-8400041830.
- Caballeros de la Orden de Calatrava que efectuaron sus pruebas de ingreso durante el siglo XIX. Madrid: Hidalguía. 1976. ISBN 978-8400034986.
- El protectorado de Carlos V en Génova la "condotta" de Andrea Doria. Madrid: Instituto Salazar y Castro C.S.I.C. 1977. ISBN 978-8400036515.
- Caballeros de la Orden de Santiago : siglo XVIII. Madrid: Hidalguia. 1977. ISBN 978-8400036195.
- La herencia imperial de Carlos V en Italia el Milanesado. Madrid: Instituto Salazar y Castro C.S.I.C. 1978. ISBN 978-8400037284.
- Extracto de los expedientes de la Orden de Carlos 3.⁰ : 1771–1847. Madrid: Hidalguía. 1979. ISBN 978-8400044817.
- El saco de Prato, la primera reposición de los Médicis en Florencia y la presencia de España en el Milanesado. Madrid: Instituto "Salazar y Castro" (C.S.I.C.). 1982. ISBN 978-8400050368.
- Doble coronación de Carlos V en Bolonia, 22-24/II/1530. Madrid: Instituto Salazar y Castro (C.S.I.C.). 1985. ISBN 978-8400060497.
- Hacienda de Carlos V al fallecer en Yuste. Madrid: Hidalguía. 1985. ISBN 978-8400060503.
- La República de Siena y su anexión a la corona de España. Madrid: Hidalguía. 1985. ISBN 978-8400059132.
- Carlos I de Castilla, señor de las Indias. Madrid: Hidalguía. 1988. ISBN 978-8400067496.
- El Concilio de Trento en la época del Emperador Carlos V. Madrid: Hidalguía. 1990. ISBN 978-8487204180.
- Caballeros de la Orden de Alcántara que efectuaron sus pruebas de ingreso durante el siglo XVIII. Madrid: Hidalguía. 1991. ISBN 978-8487204302.</
- Diario del emperador Carlos V : itinerarios, permanencias, despacho, sucesos y efemérides relevantes de su vida. Madrid: Hidalguía. 1992. ISBN 8487204406.
- Heráldica, genealogía y nobleza en los editoriales de "Hidalguía" : 1953–1993 : 40 años de un pensamiento. Madrid: Hidalguía. 1993. ISBN 978-8487204548.
- Caminos y derroteros que recorrió el emperador Carlos V : noticias fundamentales para su historia. Madrid: Hidalguía. 1999. ISBN 978-8489851191.
- Carlos V : miscelánea de artículos publicados en la revista "Hidalguía". Madrid: Hidalguía. 2001. ISBN 978-8489851344.

== Honors and appointments ==
- Bailiff Grand Cross of the Sacred Military Constantinian Order of Saint George with Collar
- Knight of the Order of St. Januarius
- Commander of the Order of the Immaculate Conception of Vila Viçosa
- Commander of the Order of Saint Sava
- Knight Grand Cross of the Order of Civil Merit
- Knight Grand Cross of the Order of Isabella the Catholic
