= Coat of arms of Medellín (Spain) =

- Armiger: Municipality of Medellín.
- Adopted: September 16, 1992
- Crest: Closed Royal Crown
- Earlier version(s): Medellín coat of arms until 1992.
- Use: Official documentation.; Local flag.; Brochures.; Posters.

The coat of arms of Medellín is the heraldic emblem that identifies the municipality of Medellín in the province of Badajoz (autonomous community of Extremadura). The emblem is described by the following blazon:

Quartered shield. First, of silver, a bridge of gules with three arches on waves of azure and silver added to a tower of gules, crenellated and clarified of the field, both mazoned. Second, of gules, a castle of three towers of gold and clarified of azure. Third, checkered with fifteen pieces of azure and gold. Fourth, of silver, a two-headed eagle in sable. To the bell, closed Royal Crown.

This coat of arms was officially adopted and approved by the Government of Extremadura by Decree of September 16, 1992, "approving the Heraldic Coat of Arms and Municipal Flag for the Town Hall of Medellín".

The first quarter is allusive to the Roman bridge of the municipality; the second, to the castle where the Counts of Medellín resided; the third, to the House of Portocarrero; and the fourth, to Hernán Cortés, a native of Medellín.

This coat of arms came to replace, coinciding with the celebrations of the fifth centenary of the settlement of the Americas in 1992, the previous coat of arms already described in the Nobiliario de los reinos y señorios de España by Francisco Pifererr, published in 1860, and whose blazon was the following:

In a field of azure, on waves of azure and silver, a silver bridge, defended by two towers of the same metal, at its ends, mazoned sable and added an image of the Virgin.
