= Coat of arms of Antioquia Department =

Coat of arms of Antioquia
- Armiger: The Department of Antioquia.
- Adopted: August 23, 1812
- Shield: A matron dressed and adorned Indian, seated between the plantain and the palm, and reclining at the foot of a hill Or, with a rushing river at her feet, uncapping in the most graceful attitude a phrygian cap.
- Use: Gubernatorial Flag, official documents, medal.

The coat of arms of Antioquia, in its current form, dates back to August 23, 1812, when it was officially adopted by the Chamber of the Senate of Antioquia by means of Decree 21 of 1812, replacing the Great State Seal of Antioquia that was sanctioned by State President José María Montoya Duque on September 2, 1811. Following the incorporation of Antioquia into the United Provinces of New Granada and subsequently to the Granadine Confederation and the United States of Colombia, the Sovereign State of Antioquia adopted the coat of arms of Colombia as its state arms. Antioquia reverted to the original coat of arms in 1912 for the occasion of the centenary of the independence of Antioquia and it has been in official use ever since.

== Coat of arms ==
The coat of arms as is seen today follows the blazon ordered in 1812:

That the State take for arms in its public escutcheons and in the great seal of the Dispatch of business, a matron dressed and adorned Indian, seated between the plantain and the palm, and reclining at the foot of a hill Or, with a rushing river at her feet, uncapping in the most graceful attitude a phrygian cap.

— Chamber of the Senate, Antioquia, Decreto Nº 21 del 23 de agosto de 1812

The rulers wanted not only to record the autonomy of the New State, but they wanted to symbolize its wealth and virtue with the golden hill, its triumphs and victories with the palm, its abundance with the plantain tree, its freedom with the phrygian cap, and the whole Antioquian race with the matron.

Although the coat of arms was adopted and blazoned in 1812, the coat of arms would only take form until 1912 when it was officially recreated for the occasion of the centenary of the independence of Antioquia by orders of the historian José María Mesa Jaramillo and executed by Daniel Mesa. The model used to draw the matron who is supposed to represent the Antioquian population, was a Mexican actress named Virginia Fábregas. The coat of arms is currently used as a symbol of the state and is displayed at departmental buildings and offices, issued in official documentation, cast into a medal awarded by the department, and used in conjunction with the civilian flag of Antioquia to form the Governor's flag.

== Great State Seal ==
Amidst the unfolding events of the Colombian Declaration of Independence in 1811, the then province of Antioquia declared its independence from the Spanish Crown on July 29, 1811, becoming a free and independent state. In recognition of this, the President of Antioquia José María Montoya Duque adopted by special decree the issued accord of the Supreme Legislative Power, the Great Seal of Antioquia on September 2, 1811, for its use as the seal and insignia of the state, as well as its use in the uniforms of its Representatives and those of the Royal Finance Court.

Great State Seal of the Republic of Antioquia (1811)

=== Blazon of the Great Seal ===
Oval argent, marshalled quarterly: I an oak eradicated trunked sable, a crow proper trussed atop the oak, II a tower Or, masoned sable and ajouré azure, III two arms armoured Or their forearms pilewise, hands naked, IV a lion rampant tenné. On base argent, a garland of six fern branches gathered at the middle by a ribbon in bow Or, atop inscribed are the initials R.Z.C.B.Y.C. The whole flanked by a branch of coffee fructed and a branch palm both proper, in a circle void inscribed with Fe Pvblica Del Estado Lybre E Yndependyente De Antioquya (Castilian: Public Faith of the Free And Independent State of Antioquia).

The design of the Great Seal was purposefully design to represent the whole territory of Antioquia; The marshalling of the escutcheon is composed with charges from the coats of arms of the cities of Santa Fe de Antioquia, Medellín, Marinilla and Rionegro in that order. The base's initials stand for the cities not subject to departmental capitulation of Remedios, Zaragoza, Cáceres, San Bartolomé, Yolombó and Cancán (now Amalfi).

== Arms borrowed ==
Shortly after its independence, Colombia experimented with various forms of governments from confederation to federation to dictatorship to finally a republic. During this time of transition, Antioquia, along with the other subdivision entities, used the coat of arms of Colombia as its state insignia and arms. To differentiate each state, an addition around the coat of arms was added; it consisted of an oval band in gules surrounding the coat of arms with the name of the country at the time on top, and at the bottom, separated by a star in argent at each side, the legend: Estado Soberano de Antioquia (Spanish: Sovereign State of Antioquia).

These arms were also utilized as emblems in the flags that Antioquia used during this period as no formal banner had been adopted by the department until 1962.

Coat of arms under the Granadine Confederation.

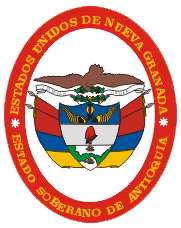
Coat of arms under the United States of New Granada.

Coat of arms under the United States of Colombia.

== Decoration ==
Escudo de Antioquia
- Type: Triple-grade Medal
- Description: A golden medal with the coat of arms of Antioquia inscribed and a ribbon in green and white, the colours of the flag of Antioquia.
- Country: Colombia
- Presented by: the Department of Antioquia
- Status: Active

Precedence
- Next (lower): Star of Antioquia

The Department of Antioquia's highest civilian decoration is the Shield of Antioquia (Spanish: Escudo de Antioquia), a medal bearing the coat of arms of Antioquia in a ribbon with the colours of the flag of Antioquia. The medal comes in two categories: gold and silver, and it can be awarded by decree to individuals, corporations or institutions.

== See also ==
- Flag of the Department of Antioquia
