= Paul Alexander Bartlett =

American writer, artist and poet (1909–1990)

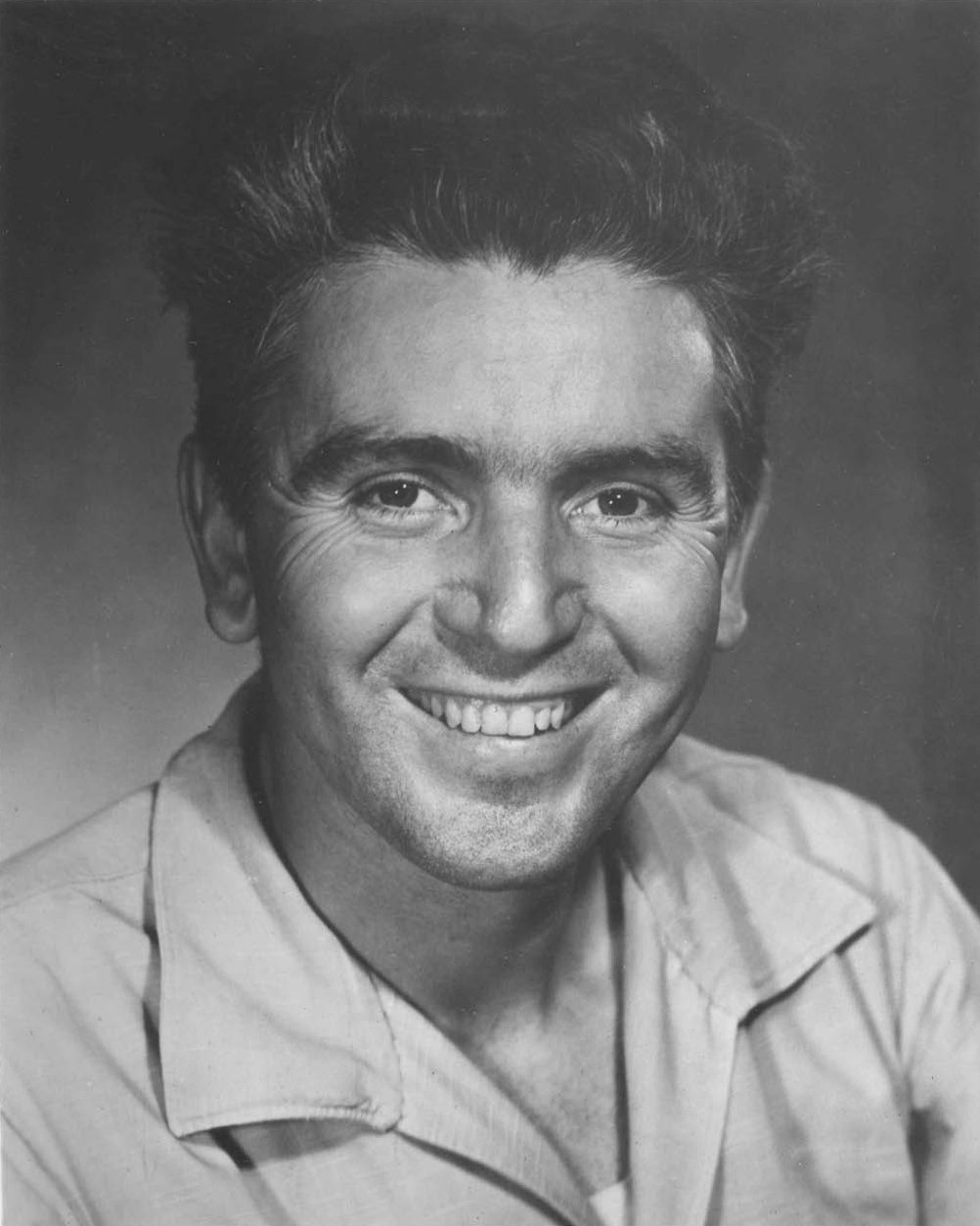
- Bartlett in 1960. Photograph from Steven James Bartlett's "Elizabeth Bartlett and Paul Alexander Bartlett: Two Portraits" from PhilPapers
- Born: July 13, 1909; Moberly, Missouri, U.S.
- Died: April 19, 1990 (aged 80)
- Occupations: Writer, artist, poet
- Spouse: Elizabeth Roberta Winters (m. 1943)
- Children: Steven
- Parent(s): Robert Alexander Bartlett; Minnie Lou Dobson

Paul Alexander Bartlett (July 13, 1909 – April 19, 1990) was an American writer, artist, and poet. He made a large-scale study of more than 350 Mexican haciendas, published novels, short stories, and poetry, and worked as a fine artist in a variety of media.

== Life ==
Bartlett was born in Moberly, Missouri. He was the son of Robert Alexander Bartlett and his wife, Minnie Lou Dobson. Paul Alexander Bartlett studied at Western Reserve Academy, Oberlin College, University of Arizona, Academia de San Carlos, Universidad de Guadalajara, Escuela de Bellas Artes de Guadalajara, and the National University of Mexico. His professional life was devoted to writing, fine art, and poetry.

In 1941, he met American poet Elizabeth Bartlett in Guadalajara; they were married in 1943 in Sayula, Mexico. Elizabeth Bartlett (1911–1994) is the author of many published books of poetry, anthologized poetry, individually published poems in leading literary journals, short stories, and founder of the international non-profit organization, Literary Olympics, Inc. They had one child, Steven James Bartlett (b. 1945), a published author in the fields of psychology and philosophy. Over a period of more than four decades, Paul Alexander Bartlett lived in numerous areas of Mexico while he undertook a lifelong extensive study of more than 350 haciendas throughout the country, documented in art and photographs. Periodically he, his wife, and son returned to the U.S. where Bartlett worked as a free-lance writer, editor, book reviewer, and fine artist.

In 1942, he served as Editor of Workshop (an annual of creative writing based in Ciudad Guzmán, Mexico). He taught creative writing at Georgia State College (now Georgia State University) in 1955. He was Editor of Publications for the University of California, Santa Barbara, 1964–1970. After purchasing a home in Comala, Mexico, his health failed in 1975; he and his wife then settled in San Diego where Bartlett continued to write and create works of art until his death in 1990.

== Study of the haciendas of Mexico ==
Bartlett made a large-scale study of the Mexican haciendas, realized between 1943 and 1985; during this period he visited more than 350 haciendas located throughout Mexico. He was drawn by their architectural variety, by an interest in the life of both privilege and oppression they represented, and by their physical remoteness; as a result he devoted the majority of his life to their study. Often accompanied by his young son, Steven, he visited haciendas throughout Mexico, reaching them on horseback, or by mule, car, train, boat, and sometimes on foot. Bartlett made a record of the haciendas he visited through some 370 original pen-and-ink illustrations and more than 1,000 photographs taken on location by him, resulting in the publication in 1990 of The Haciendas of Mexico: An Artist's Record. Mexico's historian of the haciendas, Gisela von Wobeser, provided the Introduction, while James Michener, who became aware of Bartlett's hacienda study in 1968, and commended his work, contributed the foreword to the book.

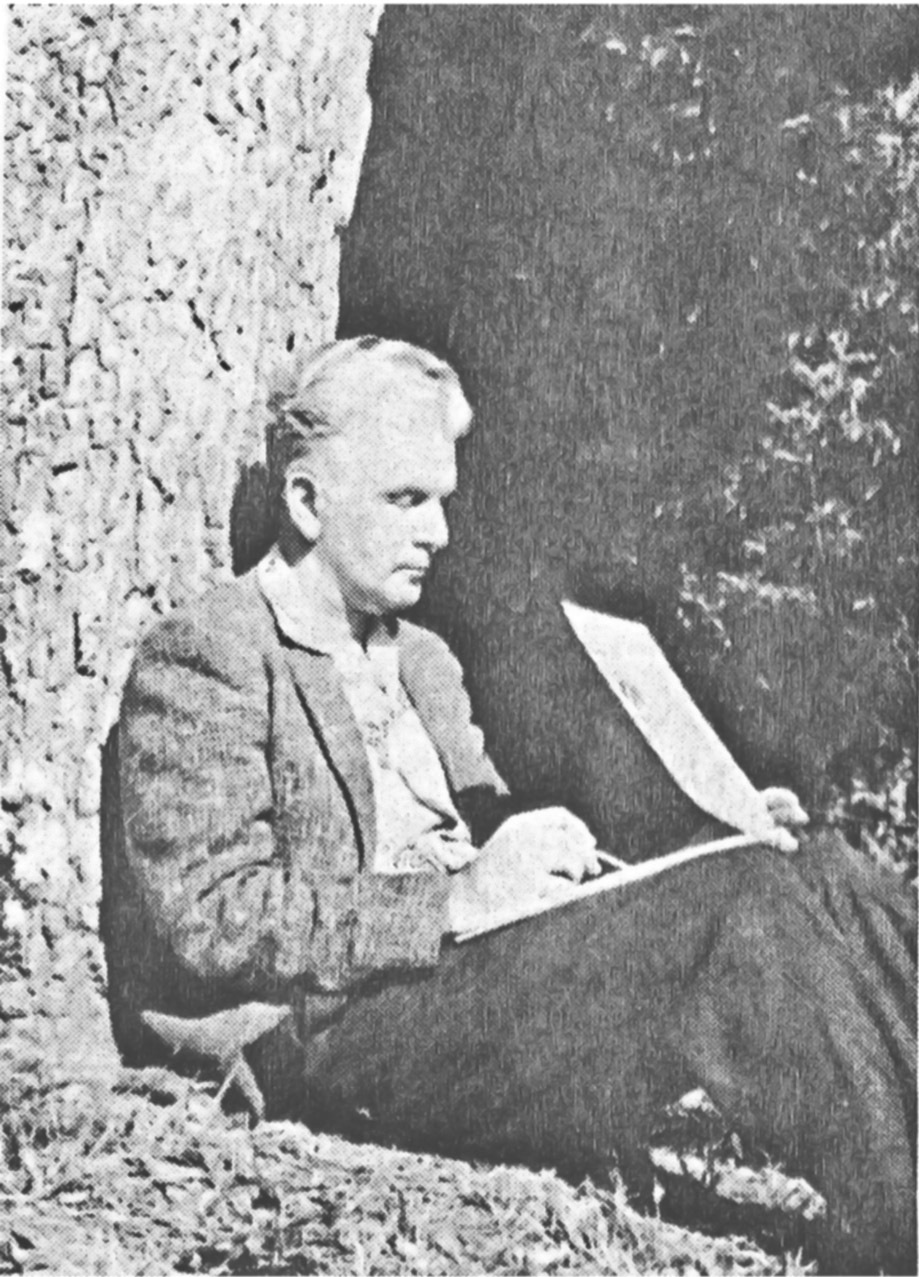
Paul Alexander Bartlett sketching a Mexican hacienda, photo circa 1973. Photograph from Steven James Bartlett's "Elizabeth Bartlett and Paul Alexander Bartlett: Two Portraits" from PhilPapers

The hacienda system played a fundamental role in Mexican history parallel to that of America's plantations in the South. After the Mexican Revolution of 1910, a great many of the haciendas have become ruins and many that Bartlett visited early in his study have ceased to exist; especially for these, Bartlett's record in art and photography is in many cases the only surviving testimony to their historical, architectural, and economic importance.

Collections of Bartlett's original art, photography, notes, and other materials are preserved by the Benson Latin American Collection of the University of Texas, by the American Heritage Center of the University of Wyoming, by the Charles E. Young Research Library of the University of California at Los Angeles, by Tulane University, and by the Toledo Museum of Art in Ohio. (For online finding aids to these collections and descriptions of their contents, see below under "Permanent Collections.")

Bartlett's lifelong study of the Mexican haciendas has received recognition by historians and art critics: Early in Bartlett's study Mexican historian Ricardo Lancaster-Jones learned of Bartlett's project and contributed a group of hacienda photographs. Critical assessments of Bartlett's hacienda study include: "Work of indubitable historic and artistic interest... [S]ince these edifices are fast disappearing, his work has great value for the history and monumental art of Mexico" (Silvio Zavala, historian of Mexico and former Ambassador of Mexico to France); "extraordinarily worthwhile collection" (Donald B. Goodall, former director, Blanton Museum of Art of the University of Texas). "These [pen-and-ink illustrations of the haciendas] are interpretations by a strong personality. The themes are projected as though by a creator of the theatre. [Bartlett's] technic, or better still, his technics, are full of wisdom and experience. They express not only the true character of the places represented, but also a personal atmosphere that is decorative and imaginative. There is always mystery in his drawings. He evokes this mystery in black and white, and there is no doubt that his work expresses the qualities of a magnificent poet artist" (Roberto Montenegro, Mexican artist). Frank Tannenbaum, Professor of History at Columbia University, wrote: "[Y]ou really have something which is beautiful and permanent, and something which is the result of long and devoted interest to a phase of Mexican history which is passing away.". Writing about the single-artist exhibition of Bartlett's pen-and-ink hacienda illustrations hosted by the Los Angeles County Museum, Gerald Nordland, former Dean of the Chouinard Art School, described the exhibit in the Los Angeles Times: "In a valuable art exhibit, Mr. Bartlett documents the architecture, sculpture, and utilitarian objects related to the life of the hacienda, in sensitively descriptive drawings of the feudal villas of the Mexican past. This exhibition material... [offers] a record of the vanishing architectural-social-economic history of Mexico."

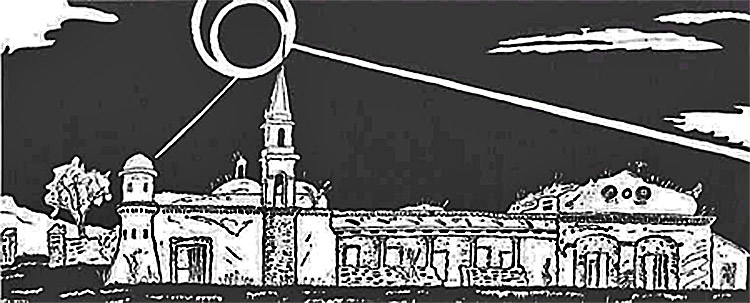
Hacienda de Mediñero, Jalisco, Mexico. Main hacienda residence; one-room school was located in the right wing of residence. Pen-and-ink illustration by Paul Alexander Bartlett, from Bartlett's The Haciendas of Mexico: An Artist's Record. University Press of Colorado (1990); Project Gutenberg edition

About Bartlett's The Haciendas of Mexico: An Artist's Record, Oakah L. Jones, Professor of History, Purdue University, wrote: "This publication will aid scholars as a reference work for illustrative material and descriptions of decaying or lost haciendas. At the same time, the work will be of great interest to the general reader interested in Mexico and its history." Historian Barbara A. Tenenbaum of the Hispanic Division of the Library of Congress described The Haciendas of Mexico: An Artist's Record as "a remarkable book in many ways, and one whose virtues can only grow with time. Paul Alexander Bartlett began sketching and photographing Mexican haciendas in the 1940s, and although his works reflect a considerably different style, they are comparable with Frederick Catherwood's historic renderings of the Maya ruins found by John Lloyd Stephens a century before."

== Works of fiction and critical response ==
Paul Alexander Bartlett's published book-length works of fiction include:

=== When the Owl Cries ===
When the Owl Cries (Macmillan, 1960). The book's title is from the Mexican-Indian superstitious saying, "Cuando el tecolote llora, se muere el indio" – "When the owl cries, an Indian dies." The work was listed by The New York Times in its Best-seller/Recommended column for several weeks after its release. The dramatic setting of the novel is an hacienda caught up in the violence of the Mexican Revolution of 1910. The story recounts the life of the hacendado, the owner of the hacienda, the love he feels for a beautiful young woman, and the ordeals they share as the turmoil and violence of the Mexican Revolution encompass them. The novel closely follows the history of the Revolution, and gives the reader a first-hand feeling for hacienda life.

Reviews of the book appeared in newspapers in the U.S. and abroad (see below under "Recognition and Importance"). The novel was described in the Library Journal as "A Gone with the Wind of Mexico." Charles Poore, reviewing the book in The New York Times, wrote: "As you turn the pages you ask, what next? That is the immemorial appeal of the thriller. But what gives the story stature as a work of creative art is that Mr. Bartlett has been at pains to populate it with believable characters who are stirred by intensely personal concerns." Paul Engle, in the Chicago Tribune, wrote: "The book charms with its expert knowledge of place and people." Lon Tinkle, writing in the Dallas Morning News, commented: "Vivid, impressive, highly pictorial. What makes it a pleasure to read are its marvelous vignettes of Mexican ways of life." The Florida Times-Union reviewed the book with the comment: "This is a book the reader can see in his mind — on a wide screen in technicolor with stereophonic sound. It doesn't need Hollywood but it's the kind of story that wouldn't do the movies any harm."

=== Adiós, Mi México ===
When the Owl Cries was followed in 1979 by Bartlett's novelette, Adiós, Mi México (Autograph Editions). Like When the Owl Cries, the novelette takes place on an hacienda; it recounts the struggle of an hacienda-owning family during the Mexican Revolution. About the book, Evelyn Eaton wrote: "The novelette has a wonderful flavor of its own. It is a classic." James Purdy added: "I read Adiós, Mi México with great pleasure. Bartlett really does the Mexican ambiente well. The novelette is very good indeed and most distinguished." Grace Flandrau commented: "Adiós, Mi México rings so true; characters and scenes are so right and living. It is so beautifully done, one finds oneself feeling it is not fiction but actual experienced fact." Frank Tannenbaum commented: "The novelette shows a true sense of both the character of the hacienda and the tragedy that overtook it; it is written with great sensibility." Ralph Roeder noted: "Bartlett's gifts, his pungent sense of language, his style, his poignant sympathy for and intimate knowledge of Mexican life mark his work as outstanding." Josephine Jacobsen observed: "I became so fascinated with this book that I sat down and read it straight through. Since I have been to Mexico five times, it seemed especially real to me, and most moving. It is certainly beautifully written and so vivid that one feels oneself inside it."

=== Forward, Children! ===
Several of Bartlett's novels were published following his death. Forward, Children! (My Friend Publisher, 1998) is an anti-war novel that received recognition from well-known authors who included Pearl Buck, Upton Sinclair, John Dos Passos, and Ford Madox Ford. The title comes from the opening line of the French national anthem, "La Marseillaise": "Allons, enfants de la patrie / Le jour de la gloire est arrivé" — "Forward, children of our country / The day of glory is at hand." The novel describes World War II as experienced by a group of U.S. soldiers in the tank corps during battles in France, Germany, and North Africa. At the same time, Forward, Children! is a love story that unfolds in Ermenonville, France, where Jean-Jacques Rousseau lived during the last period of his life and was buried.

About the novel, literary critic and novelist Russell Kirk wrote: "Permit me to commend Forward, Children! The novel attains a pathos rare in war novels. The scenes of battle are drawn with power. Bartlett is an accomplished writer." Pearl Buck, Nobel Laureate in Literature, wrote: "He [Bartlett] is an excellent writer. Forward, Children! is an excellent piece of work, with fine characterizations." John Dos Passos commented: "This is a very, very good novel." Upton Sinclair wrote: "I found Forward, Children! extremely interesting and convincing. I think it is one of the best descriptions of fighting I have ever read. In fact, I can't remember any account of tank fighting in such detail and [that is so] convincing." James Purdy remarked: "Forward, Children! ranks with the best books — its anti-war message is inescapable. It is an important book and [Bartlett is] an important writer." Ford Madox Ford wrote at length about the novel in an essay in the Saturday Review of Literature: "Forward, Children! ... is the projection of the life of a fighting soldier in the A. E. Tank Corps in France. It is so to the life that for some days after reading it, the writer's nights were rendered heavy by the return of the lugubrious dreams that for years after the signing of the Treaty of Versailles attended on his slumbers. When you read Forward, Children! you are in a tank crawling amidst unspeakable din and unthinkable pressure up the sides of houses, and down the banks of dried-up canals, crashing through the walls of factories. ... [I]f not on artistic grounds then at least for the public weal this book should be published and widely circulated." John Dos Passos remarked: "Praise from Ford Madox Ford is praise indeed. The descriptions of tank warfare are vivid and as far as I know unique."

=== Voices from the Past ===
Bartlett's quintet of novels, a format rarely found in literature, was published in 2007. The five novels that comprise Voices from the Past include Sappho's Journal, Christ's Journal, Leonardo da Vinci's Journal, Shakespeare's Journal, and Lincoln's Journal. Based on historical research, Bartlett sought to bring to life the inner experience of these "voices from the past" in the form of intimate, personal journals, incorporating into each novel passages from their original writings as well as quotations from others who knew them. Each novel is illustrated with Bartlett's pen-and-ink illustrations. Also in 2007, Sappho's Journal, with a preface by Sappho scholar and translator Willis Barnstone, and Christ's Journal were published as separate volumes. About Sappho's Journal, Barnstone wrote: "Paul Bartlett's journal of Sappho is a masterful work..., at once poetic, dramatic and powerful. In his Journal he does more than create a vague illusion of the past. He conveys the character of real people, their interior life and outer world. A mature artist, he writes with ease and taste."

Between 2012 and 2015, with the consent of Bartlett's son and literary executor, Steven James Bartlett, Voices from the Past, Sappho's Journal, Christ's Journal, Forward, Children!, When the Owl Cries, and The Haciendas of Mexico: An Artist's Journal were made freely available to readers for non-commercial use through Project Gutenberg. Audio recordings of Christ's Journal and Lincoln's Journal have also been made freely available.

== Paul Alexander Bartlett's fine art ==
Bartlett's fine art has been exhibited in more than 40 single-artist shows in many leading galleries and museums in the United States and in Mexico, including the Los Angeles County Museum; the High Museum of Art in Atlanta, Georgia; the New York Public Library, the University of Virginia, the University of Texas at Austin, the Richmond Art Institute, the Memphis Brooks Museum of Art, the Huntington Hartford Foundation, the Instituto Méxicano Norteamericano (Mexico City), the Bancroft Library, and others. In addition to his series of pen-and-ink illustrations of the Mexican haciendas, Bartlett's fine art employs a variety of media including acrylics, casein, watercolor, oils, and collages that make use of such innovative materials as fur and leather. Many of his paintings and drawings reflect his love for Mexico's tropical climate and indigenous people, for the country's richly varying landscape, and for the uncomplicated life of the Mexican peasant.

== Recognition and importance ==
Bartlett has received recognition as a writer, artist, and poet. His writing has received recognition by well-known authors and critics including Ford Madox Ford, Pearl Buck, Upton Sinclair, John Dos Passos, James Michener, Evelyn Eaton, James Purdy, Grace Flandrau, Frank Tannenbaum, Ralph Roeder, David Weiss, and others. His novel When the Owl Cries was widely reviewed in the United States and England: The book's reviewers included Charles Poore in The New York Times, Paul Engle in the Chicago Tribune, Joe Knefler in the Los Angeles Times, Clifford Gessler in the Oakland Tribune, Lon Tinkle in the Dallas Morning News; other book reviews appeared in the Times Literary Supplement, London Free Press, Los Angeles Mirror News, Los Angeles Examiner, Washington Post, Atlanta Journal-Constitution, and Chicago Sun-Times. Bartlett's art has been exhibited in more than 40 major galleries and libraries in the United States and Mexico. His poetry has been published in many literary journals, poetry anthologies, and as separate collections of his poetry.

== Grants and fellowships ==
Bartlett was awarded these grants and fellowships:

- New School for Social Research Fellowship, 1955
- Huntington Hartford Foundation writing fellowship, 1960–1961
- Montalvo Foundation writing fellowship, 1961–62
- Carnegie Foundation author's grant, 1961 and 1971
- Yaddo and MacDowell Colony fellowships, 1970
- Dorland Mountain Arts Colony fellowship, 1979

== Selected works by Paul Alexander Bartlett ==
=== Books ===
- When the Owl Cries (novel). Macmillan, 1960.
- Wherehill (collection of poems). Autograph Editions, 1975.
- Adiós, Mi México (novelette). Autograph Editions, 1979.
- Spokes for Memory (collection of poems). Icarus Press, 1979.
- The Haciendas of Mexico: An Artist's Record. University Press of Colorado, 1990.
- Forward, Children!. My Friend Publisher, 1998.
- Voices from the Past – A Quintet: Sappho's Journal, Christ's Journal, Leonardo da Vinci's Journal, Shakespeare's Journal, and Lincoln's Journal. Autograph Editions, 2007.
- Sappho's Journal. Autograph Editions, 2007.
- Christ's Journal. Autograph Editions, 2007.

=== Selected short stories ===
- "Grilled Windows." Accent Magazine, Autumn, 1944.
- "World's End," with Elizabeth Bartlett. Kenyon Review, Winter, 1945.
- "Mary's Carpenter." Chicago Review, Vol. 1, No. 1, 1946.
- "Barley Water." Southwest Review, Autumn, 1947.
- "Fireflies." Arizona Quarterly, Vol. 4, No. 3, 1948.
- "Maker of Dreams." The Literary Review, Autumn, 1958.
- "The Old Explorer." Southwest Review, Winter, 1962.
- "Diosbotic." Mexican Life Magazine, Vol. 45, No. 3, 1969.
- "Chickering." The Greyledge Review, Fall, 1979.
- "Virgin of the Bees." Crosscurrents, Spring, 1983.
- "Against the Wall." Dalhousie Review, Winter, 1983.
- "Journey to Chilam." Antigonish Review, Spring, 1983.
- "A Special Place," with Elizabeth Bartlett. Queen's Quarterly, Autumn, 1984.
- "A Matter of Lineage." Stone Drum, Spring, 1989.

=== Selected non-fiction articles ===
- "Some Letters of Ford Madox Ford." Saturday Review of Literature, Aug. 2, 1941.
- "Mexican Letter." Briarcliff Quarterly, April, 1946.
- "Mexican Art Status." American Artist, Jan., 1951.
- "Haciendas of Mexico." Los Angeles Museum Quarterly, Vol. 1, Nos. 3/4, 1962–63.
- "The Hacienda Mansions." Mexican Life Magazine, Vol. 4, No. 46, 1970.
- "Life on the Hacienda," with illustrations by the author. Americas (OAS), May/June, 1982.

=== Selected poems ===
- "Open and Close." New Mexico Quarterly, Nov., 1939.
- "Mountain Village." Mexican Life Magazine, Vol. 19, No. 12, 1943.
- "Manzanillo." Mexican Life Magazine, Vol. 20, No. 3, 1944.
- "North Country." Prairie Schooner, Vol. 20, No. 4, 1946.
- "On Walking Wings." Poet Lore, Vol. XVII, No. 3, 1946.
- "The Secret." Georgia Review, Vol. 1, No. 4, 1948.
- "Biblio." ETC: A Review of General Semantics, June, 1966.
- "Measurement" and "Rain." Ululatus, Vol. 1, No. 1, 1978.
- "E." Blue Unicorn, June, 1989.

== Permanent collections of Paul Alexander Bartlett's work ==
Collections of Bartlett's original hacienda illustrations and photographs, works of fine art by him, and his literary papers and manuscripts have been established at the American Heritage Center of the University of Wyoming, the Benson Latin American Collection of the University of Texas, the University of California at Los Angeles, the Latin American Library at Tulane University, and the Toledo Museum of Art Reference Library.

- The Paul Alexander Bartlett Collection at the American Heritage Center of the University of Wyoming. This collection contains 78 of Bartlett's original Mexican hacienda pen-and-ink illustrations, as well as 1,271 prints and 799 negatives of photographs taken by him of the Mexican haciendas (in addition to those included in the collection of these at the University of Texas, see below); works of fine art by him, consisting of his original paintings in multiple media, drawings, and sketches; literary and publishing correspondence; personal records; notes; newspaper clippings; program and exhibit announcements; reviews of Bartlett's published work; Bartlett's original manuscripts; collected publications by Bartlett, including short stories, essays, poetry, and reviews; and literary reviews, journals, newspapers, and anthologies in which his work was published. The collection includes Bartlett's annual personal/literary journals for the years 1941, 1971, 1974–76, 1984–89. Also forming part of the collection are original manuscripts of a wide variety of as yet unpublished books, short stories, and poetry. Finding aid for the Paul Alexander Bartlett Collection held by the American Heritage Center of the University of Wyoming.
- Paul Alexander Bartlett Collection held by the Benson Latin American Collection of the University of Texas. The collection includes 294 original pen-and-ink illustrations by Bartlett of the haciendas of Mexico, 903 hacienda photographs, 279 negatives, and 69 slides. Online inventory of the Paul A. Bartlett Drawings and Photographs of Mexican Haciendas.
- The Paul Alexander Bartlett Collection held by the Department of Special Collections of the Charles E. Young Research Library of the University of California in Los Angeles. This collection includes a variety of published and unpublished manuscripts of works by Bartlett, literary correspondence, short story publications, and the majority of Bartlett's annual personal and literary journals spanning the years from 1919 to the end of his life. Finding aid for the collection. Online PDF inventory of this collection.
- Paul Bartlett Photograph Collection of Mexican Haciendas held by the Latin American Library of Tulane University. This collection consists of 198 Mexican hacienda photographs, spanning 18 states in Mexico, taken by Bartlett. Finding aid for the collection.
- The Paul Alexander Bartlett Collection of Submissions to the Literary Annual, Workshop, 1940–45, Charles E. Young Research Library, University of California, Los Angeles. Finding aid for this collection.
- Paul Alexander Bartlett Archival Materials, Toledo Museum of Art Reference Library, a limited group of materials consisting of one folder that "may include announcements, clippings, press releases, brochures, reviews, invitations, small exhibition catalogs, resumes, slides, and other ephemeral material." Catalog link to this collection.

== Unpublished manuscripts ==
Bartlett's writing includes as yet unpublished manuscripts of books, short stories, and narrative and other poems. These manuscripts are included in Bartlett's collected papers held by the American Heritage Center of the University of Wyoming and by the Department of Special Collections of the Charles E. Young Research Library of the University of California in Los Angeles.

The book manuscripts include:

- Maker of Dreams, a novel situated in tropical Mexico
- Black Aspirins, the story of a young man made desperate by his family's poverty in Mexico City
- The White Cactus, a novel set in the Arizona of nearly a century ago that recounts a young writer's search for his identity
- Wherehill, a full-length novel (not to be confused with Bartlett's book of poetry bearing the same title), the story of a minister's caring commitment to his parishioners during snowbound winters in the north country of Sault Ste. Marie
- Mexican Footprints, a collection of 25 short stories about Mexican life, accompanied by letters of commendation from numerous well-known writers and critics, including Pearl Buck, Michael Fraenkel, J. Donald Adams, David Weiss, James Purdy, Don M. Wolfe, and others
- Theater of Color, a long narrative poem about the Grand Canyon
- Tropic Notebook, lyrics about village life and village people in a remote area of the Mexican tropics
- Droom, a long experimental poetic narrative that seeks to capture the life and sounds of the African genesis of humanity

== External links and resources ==
=== Collections of Paul Alexander Bartlett's work ===
- Finding aid for the Paul Alexander Bartlett Collection held by the American Heritage Center of the University of Wyoming.
- Inventory of the Paul A. Bartlett Drawings and Photographs of Mexican Haciendas held by the Benson Latin American Collection of the University of Texas.
- Finding aid for the Paul Alexander Bartlett Collection held by the Department of Special Collections of the Charles E. Young Research Library of the University of California in Los Angeles.
- Finding aid for the Bartlett Photograph Collection of Mexican Haciendas held by the Latin American Library of Tulane University.
- Finding aid for the Paul Alexander Bartlett Collection of Submissions to the Literary Annual, Workshop, 1940-45, Charles E. Young Research Library, University of California, Los Angeles.
- Paul Bartlett (vertical file), Toledo Museum of Art Reference Library.

=== Biographical resources ===
- "Paul Alexander Bartlett" entry in Contemporary Authors Online. Literature Resource Center. Gale Document Number: GALE H1000005836. Detroit: Gale, 2013.
- "Paul Alexander Bartlett" entry in A Directory of American Fiction Writers, Poets & Writers. Publishing Center for Cultural Resources, 1976, p. 47.
- David Harpster. "There's No Mañana." Interview with Paul Alexander Bartlett. San Diego Sentinel, Sept. 21, 1981.
- "About the Author" in Paul Alexander Bartlett, The Haciendas of Mexico: An Artist's Record. Project Gutenberg edition, 2015.
- Steven James Bartlett, "Introduction" in Paul Alexander Bartlett, When the Owl Cries. Project Gutenberg edition, 2012.
- Steven James Bartlett, "Introduction" in Paul Alexander Bartlett, Forward, Children!. Project Gutenberg edition, 2014.
- Steven James Bartlett, "Elizabeth Bartlett and Paul Alexander Bartlett: Two Portraits." PhilPapers, 2021.

=== Books by Paul Alexander Bartlett available through Project Gutenberg ===
- Works by Paul Alexander Bartlett at Project Gutenberg
- The Haciendas of Mexico: An Artist's Record. Foreword by James Michener. Introduction by Gisela von Wobeser, trans. by Steven James Bartlett.
- Voices from the Past—A Quintet of Novels: Sappho's Journal, Christ's Journal, Leonardo da Vinci's Journal, Shakespeare's Journal, and Lincoln's Journal. Illustrated by the author.
- Sappho's Journal. Illustrated by the author.
- Christ's Journal. Illustrated by the author.
- When the Owl Cries, with an Introduction by Steven James Bartlett with photographs.
- Forward, Children!, with an Introduction by Steven James Bartlett.

=== Audio recordings of books by Paul Alexander Bartlett ===
- Christ's Journal, from Voices from the Past—A Quintet of Novels.
- Lincoln's Journal, from Voices from the Past—A Quintet of Novels.

=== Library cataloguing information ===
- Works by Paul Alexander Bartlett in the Library of Congress.
- Works by Paul Alexander Bartlett in libraries catalogued by WorldCat.
- Works by Paul Alexander Bartlett held by University of California libraries.
