= Steven Bartlett =

Steven Bartlett or Stephen Bartlett may refer to:

- Steven Bartlett (businessman) (born 1992), British-based businessman, entrepreneur, and podcaster
- Steven James Bartlett (born 1945), American philosopher and psychologist
- Steve Bartlett (born 1947), American politician
- Stephen Bartlett Lakeman (1823–1900), adventurer and soldier
