= Flandrau Science Center and Planetarium =

Flandrau Science Center & Planetarium
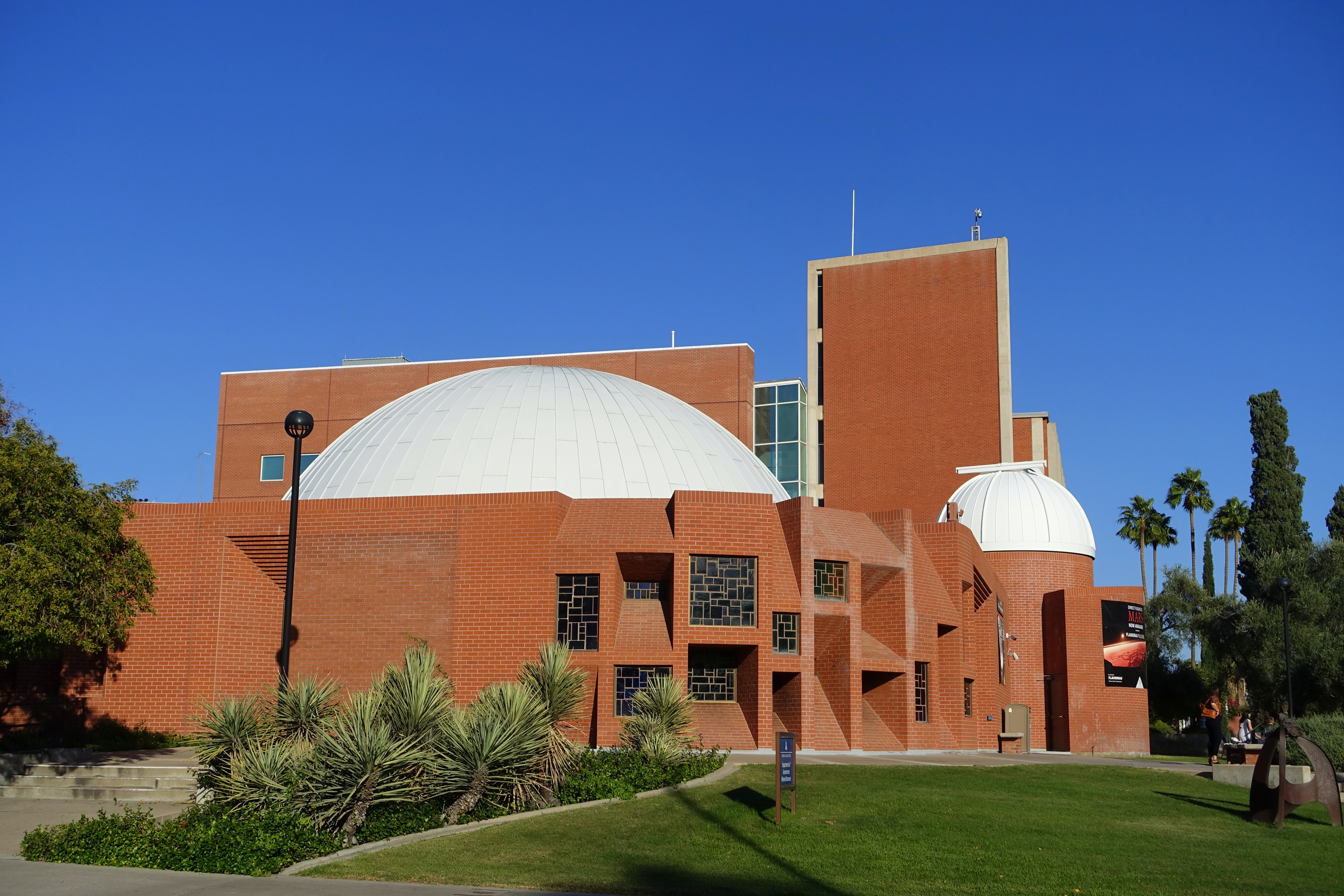
- Established: 1972
- Location: 1601 E University Blvd; Tucson, Arizona
- Coordinates: 32.2324°N 110.9477°W
- Type: Science museum
- Owner: University of Arizona
- Website: flandrau.org

The Flandrau Science Center & Planetarium is a science museum and planetarium in Tucson, Arizona. It is part of the University of Arizona. It is named after American author Grace Flandrau. The Eos Planetarium Theater has a 15.2 meter dome and seats 146 people. The science center includes a range of science exhibits related to Earth and space sciences.

The minor planet 18368 Flandrau is named after this center.

== History ==
The center was founded using a donation from the estate of American author Grace Flandrau. The university Board of Regents approved its creation in 1972 and the center first opened its doors in 1975. O. Richard Norton was its first director.

The planetarium originally used a star projector for its shows, which was nicknamed the "Hector Vector Star Projector". The star projector was replaced by newer technology. In 2017, renovations of the planetarium were completed and it was reopened under a new name, the "Eos Foundation Planetarium Theater".

== See also ==
- List of planetariums
