= Marty Gervais =

Canadian writer and artist (born 1946)

Charles Henry "Marty" Gervais (born 1946) is a Canadian poet, photographer, professor, journalist, and publisher of Black Moss Press. He was born in Windsor, Ontario.

Gervais has also published plays, children's books, non-fiction and, a book of photography, A Show of Hands: Boxing on the Border (2004). In 1998, he won the prestigious Toronto’s Harbourfront Festival Prize for his contributions to Canadian letters and to emerging writers. In 1996, he was awarded the Milton Acorn People's Poetry Award for his book, Tearing into A Summer Day. That book was awarded the City of Windsor Mayor's Award for literature. Gervais won this award again in 2003 for another collection, To Be Now: New and Selected Poems. Gervais has also been the recipient of 16 Western Ontario Newspaper Awards for journalism.

His first published novel, Reno, appeared in 2005 from Mosaic Press, and was nominated for the international Three-Day Novel Writing contest. Another book, Taking My Blood, charting his time in a hospital, and including photographs he took while he was there, came out in 2005.

In 2006 Gervais and his work were the subject of a TV Bravo episode of the television series Heart of a Poet produced by Canadian filmmaker Maureen Judge.

In May 2009, another book, Lucky Days: New Poems, appeared from Mosaic Press. This followed Gervais' 2006 book, Wait For Me, that was launched on the west coast at readings in Victoria, British Columbia, and Salt Spring Island.

In 2009, Biblioasis published The Rumrunners: The Expanded Edition. It was a bestseller, and appeared on the Globe and Mail's top 10 in non-fiction titles. In 2010, Mosaic Press published another non-fiction title, this one about growing up Catholic. It is called Afternoons with the Devil.

In 2012, Gervais was named Windsor's first poet laureate. One of his first moves was to invite the newly named parliamentary poet laureate, Fred Wah, to Windsor. Gervais also set up a poet laureate blog to feature the work of aspiring poets. He then visited Prince Edward Island's Hugh Macdonald, the province's poet laureate, and conducted workshops and readings. In 2012, Biblioasis released Ghost Road and Other Forgotten Stories from Windsor. The book brings together a collection of unusual stories from Windsor's past. In the summer of 2012, Gervais joined the Windsor Symphony Orchestra to read a poem on stage at an outdoor theatre. It was written specifically to mark the 200th anniversary of the War of 1812. In 2013, Gervais wrote People of Faith: The Story of Hotel-Dieu Grace Hospital. At a book launch on the front lawn of the Windsor hospital, he autographed more than 500 copies in less than two hours for the throng who attended to celebrate the book and the founding of the institution.

In the fall of 2012, Gervais introduced what has become the most popular literary event in the city and area — "Poetry at the Manor." This reading at Willistead Manor, the old Walkerville (Windsor, Ont.) mansion of the Hiram Walker family, proved to be the best setting for this event that brought poets laureate from all over the country to Windsor. The place was jammed with 250 people — standing room only. The event was held in October 2013 with Governor General's Award winning poet laureate of Toronto, George Elliott Clarke, reading his work. He was joined by poets laureate from Barrie, Ontario, Edmonton, Alberta, as well as those from Hamilton, Kingston and Brantford.

Earlier that summer (2013), Gervais brought writers together for another reading on the "Tall Ships" that docked on the Detroit River at the foot of Ouellette Avenue in Windsor, Ont. Again, the reading – billed at $40 a person – filled the deck of the ship. Others stood on the shore listening to the readings. It was the highlight of the celebration for the War of 1812 festivities in Windsor that summer of 2013. Gervais' work was also featured in the spring of 2013 on the popular IDEAS program on CBC from readings he did at the Edmonton Poetry Festival, again with poets laureate from all over Canada. Gervais also published a chapbook, Modest Denials in 2013.

Marty Gervais was awarded the Queen's Jubilee Medal in February 2013.

In 2017, Gervais led a group of six other writers as the poet laureate of Windsor to go out into Windsor and write poems about the city's heritage. The group called itself "The Group of Seven (Poets)" because they saw themselves, like the famous Canadian painters, as being on a mission of redefining the collective identity of living south of the U.S. border in a border town. The poems, collected in an anthology called Because We Have All Lived Here, were premiered at the opening concert in September 2017of the Windsor Symphony Orchestra with readings from actors between movements of Brahms’ Variations on a Theme of Joseph Haydn.

Marty Gervais finished out his term as Poet Laureate and was honoured by Mayor Drew Dilkens at Poetry at the Manor in October 2018 before a packed audience of more than 225 at Willistead Manor. Earlier that year in the spring, Gervais put on an event that drew more than 300 to launch new books from Black Moss Pfress, of which he is also the publisher. Black Moss Press is, one of Canada's oldest literary publishing firms. It has published more than 600 titles, and has introduced more new authors to the literary scene than almost any other literary press.

In 2018, Gervais came out with a book Five Days Walking Five Towns which records his trek across the five towns that make up Windsor's history. It is a book that in the telling cites the historic of the city through storytelling.

Gervais was Managing Editor of the Windsor Review, one of Canada's oldest literary magazines, since 1998 but retired from that in December 2019.

Gervais released two new books of poetry in 2021, A New Dress Every Day, Poems in my Mother’s Voice and also Nothing More Perfect. The poems in A New Dress Every Day were staged virtually in a film made by Taylor Campbell.

In 2020, Windsor Feminist Theatre produced a play by Gervais called Letters to Grace, based on actual letters from graduates of the former Grace Hospital in Windsor Ontario. These letters were written from leprosy colonies in India, missions in South Africa and from field hospitals in France in the Second World War. The play was also produced and performed in Windsor in August 2021 by the Windsor Feminist Theatre.

Gervais authored the book Amazing Grace, the history of Grace Hospital. This book was published in 2020 and was launched at Hotel Dieu-Grace Hospital, and more than 200 former Grace Hospital nurses showed up for the gala event.

Gervais, who is married to Donna Wright, and has four children, lives in Windsor, Ontario.
