= Windsor Review =

Bi-monthly Canadian literary magazine

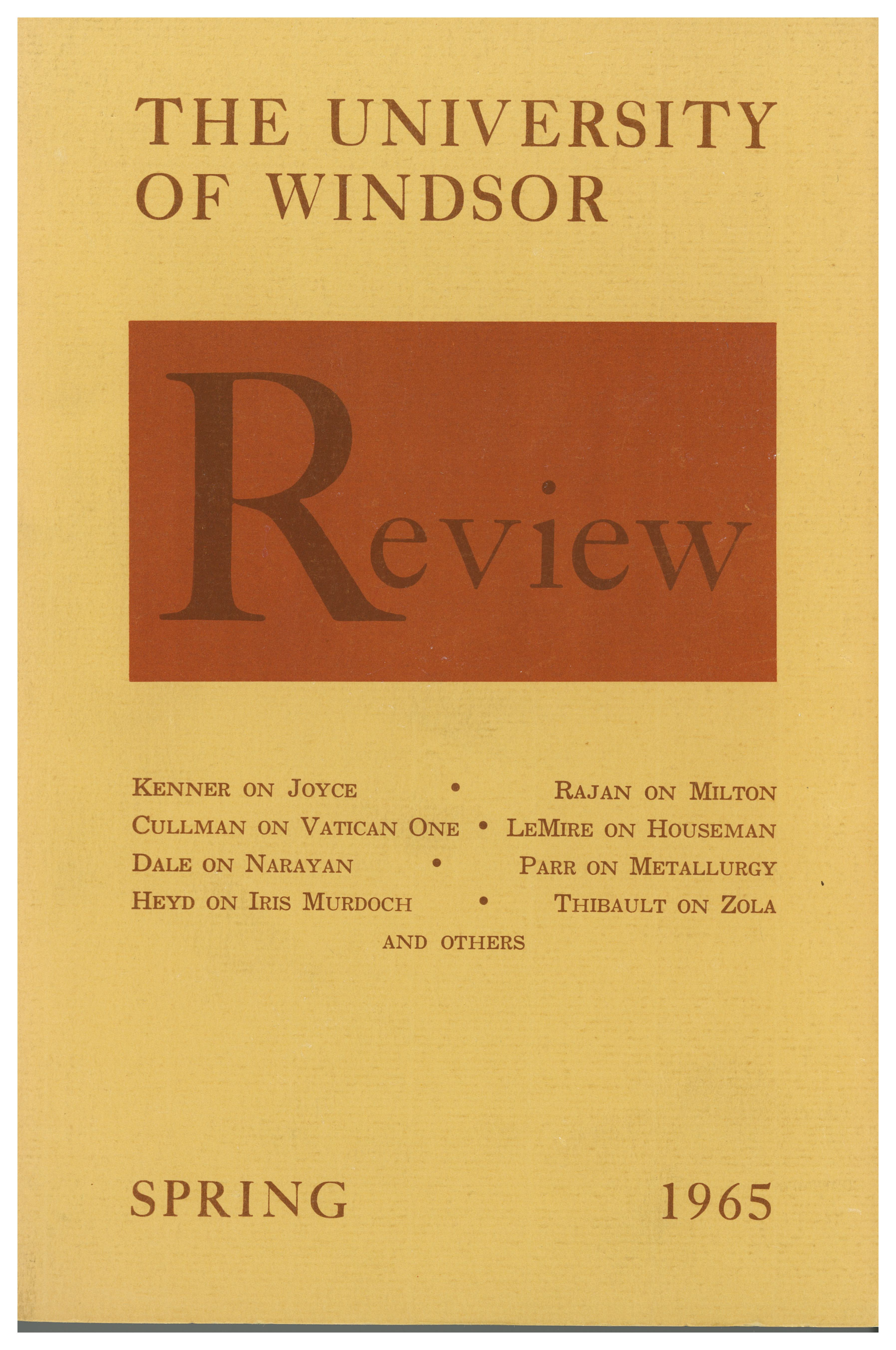
- Cover from the first issue (Spring 1965)
- Editor: Dale Jacobs
- Frequency: Biannual
- Founded: 1965
- Company: University of Windsor
- Country: Canada
- Based in: Windsor, Ontario, Canada
- Language: English
- Website: ojs.uwindsor.ca/index.php/windsor_review

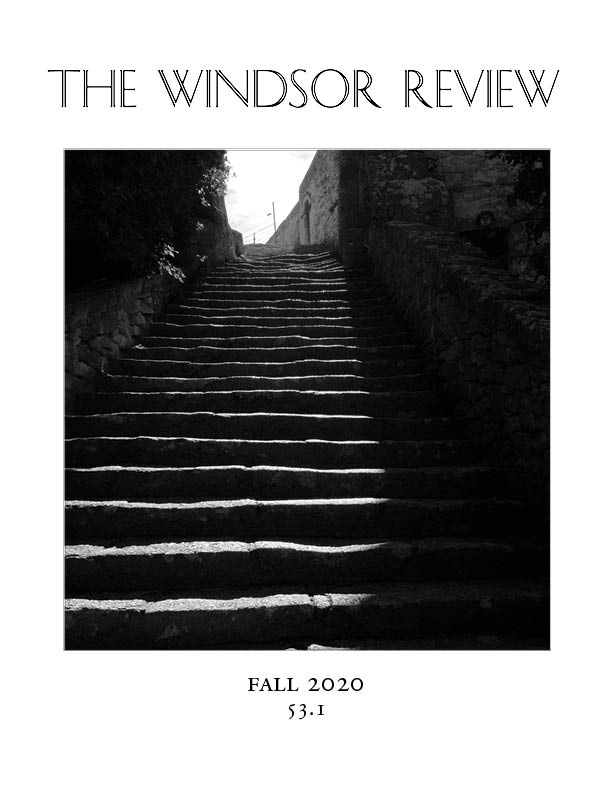
Cover from The Windsor Review 53.1 (Fall 2020)

The Windsor Review is a bi-annual journal publishing new and established writers from North America and beyond. It was established in 1965 by Eugene McNamara, and was originally named The University of Windsor Review. The Windsor Review is one of Canada's oldest continuously published literary magazines, celebrating its 50th year in 2015.

The Windsor Review was founded in January 1965 at the University of Windsor in Windsor, Ontario, Canada. It has evolved into an internationally recognized literary and arts focused journal publishing contemporary literary fiction, poetry, creative nonfiction and review essays. The journal was originally modeled on Canadian and American university quarterlies like The Dalhousie Review and The Kenyon Review.

In the early years, academic articles predominated the magazine including essays by Marshall McLuhan and Hugh Fox. From the third issue, The Windsor Review attracted established North American literary writers, and the journal's focus shifted by the mid-seventies from literary criticism to new literary writing. McNamara retired from the journal in 1987, and in 1993 its name was shortened to The Windsor Review. Under Dale Jacobs’ editorship, in October 2019, the magazine became an open access online journal. In Fall 2019, André Narbonne guest-edited The Windsor Review at 50+

== Published authors ==
Published authors include Marshall McLuhan, Joyce Carol Oates, Irving Layton, Tom Wayman, Gwendolyn MacEwen, Frances Itani, W.D. Valgardson, David Helwig, Armand Garnet Ruffo, George Elliott Clarke, Jeanette Lynes, John B. Lee, W.P. Kinsella, Alden Nowlan, Bronwen Wallace, Phil Hall, Pat Lowther, George Bowering, Lorna Crozier, Patrick Lane, David Helwig, George Elliott Clarke, Elizabeth Bartlett, Margaret Avison, Joy Kogawa, Marian Engel, Carl Dennis, Douglas Glover, Lyn Lifshin, and J. Jill Robinson.

== Published visual artists ==
In the past, The Windsor Review featured original art portfolios on such themes as art by Aboriginal peoples in Canada, text image, and installation art. Published artwork includes pieces by Jane Ash Poitras and Robert Fortin.

== Published interviews ==
Interviews include those with writers such as Alistair MacLeod, Rosemary Sullivan, Sir Martin Gilbert, James Reaney and Daniel David Moses, among others.

== Current editors ==
- Editor: Dale Jacobs
- Poetry: D. A. Lockhart
- Fiction: Hollie Adams
- Review Essays: André Narbonne

== Past editors ==
- General: Eugene McNamara, Joseph A. Quinn, Wanda Campbell, Katherine Quinsey, Marty Gervais
- Poetry: John Ditsky, Susan Holbrook, Vanessa Shields, Robert Earl Stewart
- Fiction: Joyce Carol Oates, Alistair MacLeod, André Narbonne
- Art: Evelyn G. McLean, Susan Gold Smith, Alex McKay
- Book Reviews: Lois Smedick, L.K. MacKendrick
