= Elizabeth Bartlett (American poet) =

American poet and writer (1911–1994)

- Bartlett c. 1973. Photograph courtesy of Steven James Bartlett, literary executor for Elizabeth Bartlett.
- Born: Elizabeth Roberta Winters; July 20, 1911; New York City, U.S.
- Died: August 12, 1994 (aged 83)
- Education: Columbia University
- Occupations: Poet, writer
- Spouse: Paul Alexander Bartlett (m. 1943)
- Children: Steven
- Parent(s): Lewis Winters; Charlotte Field

Elizabeth Bartlett (July 20, 1911 – August 12, 1994) was an American poet and writer noted for her lyrical and symbolic poetry, creation of the new twelve-tone form of poetry, founder of the international non-profit organization Literary Olympics, Inc., and known as an author of fiction, essays, reviews, translations, and as an editor.

== Life ==
Bartlett, née Elizabeth Roberta Winters, was born in New York City. She was the daughter of Lewis Winters and his wife, Charlotte Field. A gifted child, Bartlett skipped a grade in elementary school, completed high school in three years, and, also in three years, her bachelor's degree from Teachers' College, 1931, and subsequently carried out postgraduate study at Columbia University, 1938–40.

In 1941, she met writer and artist Paul Alexander Bartlett in Guadalajara; they were married in 1943 in Sayula, Mexico. Her husband was an accomplished artist and author of many published novels, short stories, poems, and non-fiction works relating to the Mexican haciendas. They had one child, Steven James Bartlett (b. 1945), later to become a widely published author in the fields of psychology and philosophy. For many years Elizabeth Bartlett lived in numerous areas of Mexico while she dedicated herself to poetry and her husband undertook a lifelong extensive art and photographic study of more than 350 haciendas throughout the country.

Periodically they returned to the U.S. where Bartlett taught at Southern Methodist University (1947–49), San Jose State University (1960–61), the University of California, Santa Barbara (1961–64), San Diego State University (1979–81), and the University of San Diego (1981–82). She served as Director of the Creative Writers Association of the New School for Social Research (1955), as Consultant for Theatre Atlanta, as visiting poet at universities in Canada, California, Florida, and Texas, and as Poetry Editor for ETC: A Review of General Semantics and for Crosscurrents. After purchasing a house in Comala, Mexico, her husband's health failed in 1976 and they settled in San Diego where Bartlett continued to work, give poetry readings, and teach until her death in 1994.

== Contributions to poetry ==
Called "the Emily Dickinson of the 20th Century" by Chad Walsh, distinguished poet and writer, in The Saturday Review, Elizabeth Bartlett's concise lyrics have been praised by Allen Tate, William Stafford, Ted Weiss, Maxine Kumin, Josephine Jacobsen, and Robert M. Hutchins, among others, and commended by musicians and composers. Bartlett is a widely recognized poet, the author of 16 published books of her own poetry and more than 1,000 individually published poems, as well as essays, short stories, collections of poetry edited by her, and poetry translations by her from other languages. She has gained international attention for her many publications, the creation of a new form of poetry, the twelve-tone poem, and as founder of the international non-profit organization, Literary Olympics, Inc., which has sought to reinstate the role of literature in the Olympic Games as originally conceived by the Greeks.

=== Bartlett's poetry ===
Bartlett's poetry is lyrical, disciplined in structure, expressing a heightened consciousness of word sounds and symbolism, and infused with "delicate nuance, a sort of reticent and abstracted reverie that could nevertheless, at its best, be extremely moving.... [Her poetry] bucked the trend in modern literature toward the precise and realistic description of detail and the confessional flavor...."

=== Twelve-tone poems ===
Bartlett created and developed the twelve-tone form of poetry, adapting Arnold Schoenberg's musical system to the verbal, accented sounds of language. Twelve-Tone Poems, her first book that introduced this form, was published in 1968. In Bartlett's words: "The 12-tone poem is a new form.... It was inspired by Arnold Schoenberg's musical system. The poem consists of 12 lines, divided into couplets. Each couplet contains 12 syllables, using the natural cadence of speech. The accented sounds of the words are considered tones. Only 12 tones are used throughout the poem, repeated various times. As a result, the poem achieves a rare harmony that is purely lyrical, enriching its imagery and meaning."

About this work, Allen Tate wrote: "The new form is most interesting, the poems quite beautiful and distinguished." Encouraged by this and other commendatory responses to her twelve-tone poems by poets, musicians, and composers including Stephen Sondheim, Bartlett continued to develop the new form. The House of Sleep, published in 1975, was the result, consisting of 68 poems related to dreams and written in the new form. Of these poems, William Stafford wrote: "There is a trancelike progression in these poems, in which all unfolds quietly, with a steady holding of a certain pervasive tone." Robert M. Hutchins wrote: "I am much impressed. The poems seem to me what is called an important contribution, and a beautiful one." A third collection of twelve-tone poems, In Search of Identity, was published in 1977, further establishing the diversity and versatility of ways in which Bartlett was able to make use of the new form. A fourth collection of twelve-tone poems was published in 1981, Memory Is No Stranger.

=== Literary Olympics ===
In her mission to bring the work of leading poets to public awareness, Bartlett founded the international non-profit organization, Literary Olympics, Inc. Like Marianne Moore, "Bartlett ... [was] a member of that small group of men and women who, during this century, have furthered the art of others at no small cost to themselves in time, money and sleepless nights. People such as Harriet Monroe, whose small journal Poetry furthered the careers of Ezra Pound and T. S. Eliot; Sylvia Beach, owner of the Paris bookstore Shakespeare and Company, who championed James Joyce in the face of the most rabid censors; Edward Marsh, the much-pilloried editor of the Georgian Poetry anthologies; and others."

Until her death in 1994, Elizabeth Bartlett devoted twelve years to this project whose goal was to reinstate the role of literature, and specifically of poetry, in the Olympic Games as originally implemented by the Greeks. To this end, she served as founder and CEO of Literary Olympics, Inc., an international non-profit project that brought together every four years in conjunction with the summer Olympic Games a published anthology containing the work of leading poets from many countries. She coordinated and directed the work of associate editors in Africa, Asia, Australia, New Zealand, Canada, East, North, and West Europe, Great Britain, Latin America, and the United States.

The first Literary Olympics poetry anthology was published in 1984 to coincide with the Games of the XXIII Olympiad held in Los Angeles, and included the work of poets from nine countries. The publication of the second anthology, to coincide with the 1988 Olympic Games held in Seoul, South Korea, grew to represent more than 30 nations. By 1992, coinciding with the 1992 Summer Olympics in Barcelona, Spain, the Literary Olympics anthology had grown to represent 132 poets from 65 countries and 55 languages. These anthologies shared the intent to recognize and to honor the creative work of the world's leading poets in a way that was true to the original spirit of the Greek Olympic Games. Each volume was published in a multi-language format, with non-English poems translated into English by well-qualified poetry translators.

== Recognition and importance ==
Bartlett's poetry came to the attention of leading poets, writers, and critics as diverse as Marianne Moore, Wallace Stevens, Mark Van Doren, Conrad Aiken, Allen Tate, Alfred Kreymborg, Robert Hillyer, Louis Untermeyer, Rolfe Humphries, John Ciardi, Richard Eberhart, Richard Wilbur, Maxine Kumin, Robert M. Hutchins, Kenneth Rexroth, William Stafford, and others. Over the years, Bartlett maintained an active and extensive correspondence with eminent poets, writers, and literary critics; evident throughout this collected literary correspondence are strong statements attesting to the importance of her work. About her first book of poetry, Poems of Yes and No, published in 1952, Marianne Moore wrote: "I surely find good in the Poems of Yes and No.... The clearness of the book is certainly beautiful." Wallace Stevens was impressed by Poems of Yes and No and wrote: "Your poems give one a sense of intelligence and sensibility." Alfred Kreymborg was enthusiastic about the book: "You have found a style of your own and developed it. I say yes to your poems of yes and no. This is a distinguished volume as a whole. I wish you well with this warm book. Any poet might envy the courage and artistry of what you say, or rather sing, there." Further commendation came from Robert Hillyer, who wrote: "Your poems are moving and unusual.... A distinguished achievement!"

A few years later, Moore took it upon herself to submit Bartlett's second book manuscript, Behold This Dreamer, to John Ciardi, then editor of Twayne. Although Ciardi judged the poems to be "taking and moving poems," Twayne turned the work down because the publisher felt the book of poetry would not be commercially profitable. Ciardi wrote "corn flakes being easier to sell than a good book of poems." Moore then wrote about Behold This Dreamer: "I believe in ability. It always belies annoyance." Despite this initial response, Behold This Dreamer was published in 1959.

By 1961, Jonathan Williams was saying: "Your language is cultivated, employed consistently and lucidly. To my observation, it seems fair to say that you belong with the best of your generation, which I would say includes May Swenson, Denise Levertov, Garrigue, et al." Louis Untermeyer added his voice: "I particularly like your fusion of observation and whimsicality, as well as your avoidance of the poetic stereotypes." Rolfe Humphries was intrigued by Bartlett's poetic techniques: "I enjoyed your poems and admire many...." About Behold This Dreamer, Gustav Davidson wrote: "I enjoyed reading these poems. I was impressed by their precision, clarity, and technical competence." About the same work, critic Paul Jordan-Smith wrote: "Your poems were begotten of a strong, imaginative sense. My congratulations on this beautiful collection."

Behold This Dreamer was followed by the publication of Poetry Concerto, also in 1961. Meanwhile, Bartlett had published more than 200 poems in literary reviews and anthologies, and felt encouraged to bring out a collection of her poetry. She sent the manuscript of the new work to Moore, who wrote: "You have here what is indeed a conspectus of experience, and I thank you for the book. It seems an anomaly that it is not in 'hard covers,' in shops where all might buy. This must be corrected. As I may have said before, you must not be acquiescent under neglect, nor deterred by polite evasion or any kind of inability to make headway."

This collection, titled It Takes Practice Not to Die, was published soon after, in 1964. For the book cover, Marianne Moore offered this comment: "The poems are the result of a discipline that assuredly justifies the writer, and should console the right readers (if anything can)."

From the beginning, Richard Eberhart expressed his admiration for Bartlett's work: "You have a fresh, swift, lyrical impulse." About It Takes Practice Not to Die, he wrote: "I have read these poems with pleasure.... [M]ature, they have a bite to them." Praising the same book, Mark Van Doren wrote: "These poems are clear, swift, and strong; and witty, too, in the best sense of that word." James Schevill added: "I have read your book and there is no doubt of your ability as a poet. Time and again, you strike off a powerful line!"

Twelve-Tone Poems, published in 1968, introduced the new twelve-tone form of poetry. It was followed by the publication of Threads, also in 1968. Conrad Aiken wrote: "I like the poems; they think, and they mean what they say." About this book, Kenneth Rexroth wrote: "It is certainly an impressive work."

The House of Sleep followed in 1975, and then In Search of Identity in 1977, about which Richard Wilbur wrote: "I like her work very well. It has force, economy, genuineness, and distinctness of tone."

Also in 1977, Bartlett's one-act play in verse, Dialogue of Dust, was published, and then recorded by the Fairhaven Radio Theatre in Bellingham, Washington.

In 1979, Dufour Editions, distinguished for its publication of leading British and European writers, published Bartlett's volume of poems, Address in Time. Bartlett was the first American author to be included on the Dufour list. For this book, Kenneth Rexroth provided the Introduction. In it, he wrote: "Elizabeth Bartlett's poems are good examples of the change, or one of the changes in poetry since World War II. They are poems of direct statement. They are poems of personal communication. They are overt judgments of life, of people, of value relations.... [As with the poems] of Francis Jammes, Verhaeren, ...Sandburg, ...Gertrude Stein, Laura Riding, or Reverdy...[t]hese are the kinds of poetry coming back today, a poetry I value and find here in this book..., [poetry that is concerned with the] relationships of the self to nature, of self to self, of selves to the world.... She has said clearly, 'This is the way I handle life'—and does so, superbly."

Bartlett's book, A Zodiac of Poems, was also published in 1979.

In 1981, Ohio University Press published Bartlett's Memory Is No Stranger, a fourth collection of her twelve-tone poems, calling it "an important publishing event.... [W]e believe we have taken an important step towards honoring her unusual and original twelve-tone poems." Bartlett had showed the form to be adaptable for single lyrics, multi-part poems, narratives, group sequences, dramatic compositions, chorales, elegies, and odes.

Memory Is No Stranger was then followed by The Gemini Poems (1984) and Candles (1987, 1988), about which Josephine Jacobsen wrote: "I have been simply mesmerized by this beautiful book. There is a magic sort of unity and progress which refuses to release the reader. I have read and reread the poems with increasingly pleasure." William Stafford was equally impressed by the work: "I have read it page to page, gaining from its sequence, its natural forwarding, your attaining to continuity between poems and at the same time varying the way of going forward."

Bartlett's last published book of poetry, Around the Clock, appeared in 1989. Maxine Kumin commended the book with these words: "Elizabeth Bartlett enumerates the eternal questions that preoccupy us 'while we try to sleep / on the rough floor of our hearts.' In the strictest of forms [i.e., the twelve-tone form], she examines the human condition; the poetry is pitiless, yet redemptive." Similarly, Josephine Jacobsen praised this work: "Elizabeth Bartlett understands that the very large and the very small are siblings. Perceptive and emotionally vital, her poems ask all our own questions, poems in an original and lucid form."

In addition to her published books of poetry, more than 1,000 individually published poems by Bartlett appeared in such magazines as Harper's, Saturday Review, Literary Review, Malahat Review, Prism International, Windsor Review, Harper's Bazaar, Denver Quarterly, Virginia Quarterly Review, Tamarack Review, Pierian Review, North American Review, Beloit Poetry Journal, Canadian Forum, Dalhousie Review, Antigonish Review, Women's Studies, and many others, as well as overseas in England, France, and India.

Her poems were anthologized in numerous collections, including Golden Years P. S. A., American Scene, Golden Quill, New Voices, Poets West, Encounters, New Poems by American Poets 2, American Literary Anthology 3, Contemporary Women Poets, Life and Literature, American Women's Anthology, Yearbook of American Poetry, California Bicentennial, Encounters, Second Coming, Where Is Vietnam?, The Writing on the Wall, Peace Is Our Profession, Anthology of American Verse, Against Infinity, Muse Anthology, Parthenon Anthology, and others.

== Poetry readings and recordings ==
Bartlett gave many dozens of individual poetry readings in addition to readings of her poetry during regular teaching appointments. She gave readings as Visiting Poet at Simon Fraser University, the University of British Columbia, Fairhaven College, the University of the Pacific, Loyola University in Los Angeles, the University of Florida, and the University of Houston, as well as for public libraries and museums across the country. Taped recordings of her readings were made for the Library of Congress, Yale, Harvard, Stanford, Fairleigh Dickinson University, the University of California, Santa Barbara, the University of California, San Diego, the University of California, Los Angeles, the University of California, Riverside, San Diego State University, Fairhaven College, San Jose State University, the University of Houston, Santa Clara University, Georgia Tech, St. Andrew's College, Agnes Scott College, Claremont College, and for FM radio stations in Atlanta, Richmond, San Francisco, and San Diego.

== Other writings and art ==
In addition to her many poetry publications, Elizabeth Bartlett was an author of fiction, essays, literary criticism, translations, and reviews. Among these, her short stories were published in such literary reviews as Accent, Arizona Quarterly, Queen's Quarterly, Kenyon Review, New Story, Dreamworks, Crosscurrents, Phantasm, Writers Forum, Prospice, Footwork, The Artful Dodge, Facet, Stone Drum, South Carolina Review, Short Story Digest, etc.

Essays by Bartlett appeared in ETC: A Review of General Semantics, Crosscurrents, New Orleans Review, National Forum, Letters, and others.

Her reviews were published in the L. A. Times, the New York Times, Dallas News, New Orleans Review, ETC: A Review of General Semantics, National Forum, Windsor Review, and other metropolitan newspapers and magazines.

Bartlett's many poetry readings were often accompanied by exhibits of her original art. Her husband, Paul Alexander Bartlett, was an accomplished fine artist whose paintings and illustrations were widely exhibited in the U.S. and Mexico. Elizabeth Bartlett shared with her husband a deep interest in art. Influenced by the Bauhaus School, her art has been exhibited by numerous museums, galleries, and art and poetry festivals in New York City, Richmond, Atlanta, San Juan Capistrano, the Love Library of San Diego State University, the Carlsbad Library, the San Diego Central Library, the San Diego Museum of Art, the Athenaeum Library, San Jose Central Library, Grossmont College, etc.

Her fine art won awards for original designs in scratchboard, brush and ink, and pen drawing. She experimented in a wide variety of media, and developed a style that is at once abstract and lyrical. Much of her art was intended and used to illustrate her published books of poetry. Some of her art pioneered a new technique created by her, which she called wax painting. It involves a controlled flow and manipulation of poured colored molten wax onto canvas, board, or paper. She also used techniques of cut paper and collage in her art, often supplemented by India ink and acrylics. The subjects she focused on in her art were drawn from her rich, symbolic imagination and dream life. She developed a preference for "primitive" art, whose unassuming simplicity she felt was capable of representing the images she wished to portray.

== Later years ==
In 1983, Elizabeth Bartlett placed her own creative work to the side to begin a project that was to occupy her for the last dozen years of her life. She was aware that the summer Olympics was scheduled to take place in Los Angeles the following year. The Olympic Games in ancient Greece had honored outstanding athletes, but also recognized poets for excellence of mind and literary talent. Bartlett therefore founded Literary Olympics to bring the cultural component back into the Olympics. She directed the work of internationally distinguished associate editors located in Africa, Asia, Australia, New Zealand, Canada, East, North, and West Europe, Great Britain, Latin America, and the United States. The international organization was granted status as a non-profit corporation under IRS Code 501(c)(3) in 1991.

Through Bartlett's leadership and editorial effort, beginning in 1984 three international anthologies of poetry were published in conjunction with the Olympics, and included the work of eminent contemporary poets, including Yehuda Amichai, Thorkild Bjørnvig, Eavan Boland, Czesław Miłosz, Odysseas Elytis, Oscar Gonzáles, Yannis Ritsos, Ewald Osers, Zbigniew Herbert, Yevgeny Yevtushenko, Octavio Paz, Eugénio de Andrade, among others. Literary Olympians: 1984 contained poetry from nine countries.

Literary Olympians II included poetry from 34 countries and was published in conjunction with the 1988 Olympic Games held in Seoul, Korea. Bartlett was brought to the Seoul Olympiad as a guest and honored by Park Seh-jik, President of the Seoul Olympics Organizing Committee, by Sook Hee Chun, President of the Korean P.E.N., and by leading Korean poet Kim Nam Cho. President Park Seh-jik contributed the introductory essay, "Greetings," published in Literary Olympians II.

Bartlett was similarly the honored guest at the 1992 Olympiad XXV held in Barcelona, Spain. Literary Olympians 1992 was published to coincide with the Barcelona Games and now included the work of 130 poets from 64 countries. In all the Literary Olympics anthologies, the poetry was published in the original languages in which it was written, accompanied by facing-page professional translations into English. Gold, silver, and bronze Literary Olympics medals were awarded in 1992 by an international panel of distinguished scholar-judges who included J. D. McClatchy of Yale University, M. L. Rosenthal of New York University, Ivar Ivask of the University of Oklahoma, Canadian literary critic Northrop Frye, and Paul Engle of the University of Iowa Translation Program. The Gold Medal in Poetry was awarded to Yehuda Amichai of Israel, the Silver Medal to Thorkild Bjørnvig of Denmark, and the Bronze Medal to Eavan Boland of Ireland. Nobel Laureate Odysseas Elytis of Greece was the anthology's Guest of Honor. An impressive group of Nobel Laureates contributed to the project, including Vicente Aleixandre, Saul Bellow, Odysseas Elytis, Czesław Miłosz, Eugenio Montale, Octavio Paz, and Jaroslav Seifert.

Numerous heads of state endorsed the Literary Olympics, among them Brian Mulroney, Prime Minister of Canada; Hedy d'Ancona, Minister of Culture of the Netherlands with the approval of Queen Beatrix; Juan A. Yanez-Barnuevo, Ambassador of Spain to the United Nations; Alfredo F. Cristiani, President of El Salvador; Lazhar Haoum, Cultural Attaché of Algeria; Marja-Leena Rautalin, Director, Finnish Literature Centre, Helsinki with the endorsement of Mauno Henrik Koivisto, President of Finland; Gladys Ramírez de Espinoza, Director of the Institute of Culture of Nicaragua; Rodrigo Pacheco López, Vice-Minister of Culture, Costa Rica; and others.

At the time of Bartlett's death in 1994, she was nearing the completion of the fourth international anthology to be published to commemorate the 100th anniversary of the modern Olympic Games to be held in 1996 in Atlanta. Prof. Dasha Čulić Nisula of the Department of Foreign Languages and Literatures at Western Michigan University agreed to complete the editorial task for this international collection. The anthology was published as a memorial volume to honor Bartlett. It contained the work of leading poets from 20 countries, writing in 15 languages, published with facing-page translations by professional poetry translators. As a legacy to the future of poetry, Elizabeth Bartlett endowed a time-leveraged "Benjamin Franklin trust" for a period of one hundred years for the international benefit of poetry. At the end of the one hundred-year term, the initial funding will have grown by compounding to provide for a self-perpetuating endowment to make it possible to continue to honor outstanding international contributions to poetry.

== Awards and honors ==
Bartlett was awarded residential fellowships at:

- the Huntington Hartford Foundation (1959 and 1960)
- Villa Montalvo (1960 and 1961), now known as the Montalvo Arts Center
- Yaddo (1970)
- the MacDowell Colony (1970)
- the Dorland Mountain Arts Colony (1979)
- Ragdale (1983)

Awards for her poetry and short stories:

- National Endowment for the Humanities award in poetry (1970)
- P. E. N. International award in poetry (1971)
- National Institute of Arts & Letters award in poetry (1971)
- Carnegie Foundation award in poetry (1971)
- P. E. N. Syndicated Fiction award in short story (1983)
- P. E. N. Syndicated Fiction award in short story, one of top 10 (1985)
- Louise M. Steele Trust Travel Grant (1985)
- N. E. A./COMBO award in poetry (1988)
- Featured Poet of the 1988 Laguna Winter Festival

Literary Olympics honors:

- Guest of honor at the 1988 Olympics in Seoul, Korea: honored for her work in founding Literary Olympics by Park Seh-jik, President of the Seoul Olympics Organizing Committee, by Sook Hee Chun, President of the Korean P.E.N., and by leading Korean poet, Kim Nam Cho.
- Guest of honor at the 1992 Olympics in Barcelona, Spain; honored for her work on behalf of Literary Olympics.

== Archives of Bartlett's work ==
Extensive permanent collections of Elizabeth Bartlett's papers, literary correspondence, publications, unpublished manuscripts, and art have been established, one as part of the Archive for New Poetry maintained by the Mandeville Department of Special Collections at the University of California, San Diego, and the second by the Rare Books Collection of the University of Louisville.

== Selected works ==
=== Books ===
- Poems of Yes and No, 1952. Available from Project Gutenberg.
- Behold This Dreamer, 1959. Available from Project Gutenberg.
- Poetry Concerto, 1961
- It Takes Practice Not to Die, 1964. Available from Project Gutenberg.
- Threads, 1968
- Twelve-tone Poems, 1968
- Selected Poems, 1970
- The House of Sleep, 1975. Available from Project Gutenberg.
- In Search of Identity, 1977
- Dialogue of Dust (a one-act play in verse), 1977
- A Zodiac of Poems, 1979
- Address in Time, 1979
- Memory Is No Stranger, 1981
- The Gemini Poems, 1984
- Candles, 1987, 1988
- Around the Clock, 1989

=== Selected short stories ===
- "A Matter of Lineage," Stone Drum
- "A Special Place," Queen's Quarterly
- "A-B-C," The Artful Dodge
- "Analfabetismo," Arizona Quarterly
- "Gloria in Excelsis," Footwork
- "Guilt," New Story
- "Hickory, Dickory, Dock," South Carolina Review
- "Journey into Fear," Dreamworks
- "Making It," Northwest Magazine
- "Mister Brown," Facet
- "Nancy's House," Writer's Forum
- "Prima Donna," Footwork
- "Shipping Out," Short Story Digest
- "The Golden Gate," Accent
- "The Hairweb," Prospice
- "Virgin of the Bees," Crosscurrents
- "Who Needs 18 Toothbrushes?," Arizona Quarterly
- "World’s End," Kenyon Review

=== Selected collections of poetry edited by Bartlett ===
- Literary Olympians: 1984. Westlake Village, CA: Crosscurrents, 1984.
- Literary Olympians II. Westlake Village, CA: Crosscurrents, 1987.
- Literary Olympians 1992: An International Anthology. Boston: Ford-Brown & Co., 1992.
- Literary Olympians 1992: An International Anthology. Second edition published by Harvard University Press, 2000.
- Leading Contemporary Poets: An International Anthology. Editing and publication posthumously completed by Dasha Čulić Nisula. A memorial volume dedicated to Elizabeth Bartlett. Kalamazoo, MI: Poetry International, 1997.

=== Selected anthologies containing Bartlett's poetry ===
- Album
- American Literary Anthology #3
- American Scene
- Aspen
- California Bicentennial
- Contemporary Woman Poets
- Encounters, 1988
- Golden Quill
- Golden Year PSA
- Life and Literature
- Monitor
- Muse Anthology
- New Poems by American Poets 2
- New Voices
- Parthenon Anthology
- Peace Is Our Profession
- Poets West
- Second Coming
- The Writing on the Wall
- Where Is Vietnam?
- Yearbook of American Poetry, 1981, 1984, 1985

=== Selected essays ===
- "A Proposal to Support Creative Artists," Letters
- "Dante's Tenzone," Italica. Collaboration with Antonio Illiano
- "Introduction to Award Winners," Crosscurrents
- "Introduction to Award Winners II," Crosscurrents
- "Introduction to Literary Olympians I," Crosscurrents
- "Introduction to Literary Olympians II," Crosscurrents
- "Introduction to Literary Profiles," Crosscurrents
- "Introduction to Many Voices," Crosscurrents
- "Introduction," Literary Olympians 1992
- "Letters of Flannery O'Connor," National Forum
- "Sor Juana de la Cruz," New Orleans Review
- "The Making of an Editor," Crosscurrents
- "The Mirror View," ETC: A Review of General Semantics
- "In Tribute to Jaroslav Seifert," Crosscurrents
- "Word Barriers," ETC: A Review of General Semantics
- "Word Bridges," ETC: A Review of General Semantics

=== Poetry-related art ===
Bartlett illustrated many of her published books of poetry. Her poetry-related illustrations were exhibited in museums, public libraries, and art festivals across the country, including New York City, Richmond, Atlanta, San Juan Capistrano, the Love Library of San Diego State University, the Carlsbad Library, the San Diego Central Library, the San Diego Museum of Art, the Athenaeum Library, San Jose Central Library, Grossmont College, and others. Collections of the original illustrations, as well as other fine art by Bartlett, are preserved in collections maintained by the University of California, San Diego and the University of Louisville.

=== Poetry recordings ===
Master tapes of recordings of poetry readings given by Elizabeth Bartlett form part of her collections maintained by the University of California, San Diego and the University of Louisville. These recordings include the following readings:

- Readings of selections from her published books, including:

Poems of Yes and No
Behold this Dreamer
Poetry Concerto
It Takes Practice Not to Die
Threads
Twelve-Tone Poems
Selected Poems
The House of Sleep
In Search of Identity
Dialogue of Dust (performed by Radio Theatre, Fairhaven College, Bellingham, Washington)
Address in Time with an Introduction by Kenneth Rexroth
A Zodiac of Poems
Memory is No Stranger
The Gemini Poems
Candles
Around the Clock

- A complete reading of Hermann Hesse's novel, Magister Ludi
- "Early Poems for Son, age 4-8"
- "Christmas over the Years, a Family Story," written by Elizabeth Bartlett

=== Translations ===
Bartlett also translated poetry from other languages. Her translations appeared in Italica, Italian Quarterly, La Revue Moderne, Poésie Contemporaine, Poésie-USA, La Voix des Poètes, Poemas de Griselda Alvarez, etc.

== Unpublished manuscripts ==
Bartlett's prolific output also includes as yet unpublished manuscripts of books, narrative and other poems, short stories, plays, ballet scripts, and essays. Copies of the original manuscripts are included in Bartlett's collected papers held by the University of California, San Diego. The book manuscripts include:

- Chili Con Blarney. An autobiographically based novel about Bartlett's early years in Mexico.
- Beatrice
- Portrait of Time: Sea Drift. An autobiographically based novel recounting Bartlett's childhood years
- Biography of a Summer (c. 1940)
- Novella, a collection of short stories
- Theme and Variations (1939)
- This Side the Fog
- With Love, Mom
- Country Wedding
- Bartlett's Mexico: Short Stories by Paul and Elizabeth Bartlett
- The City
- Those Lucid Moments
- Gourmet on a Budget

== External links and resources ==
- Works by Elizabeth Bartlett at Project Gutenberg
- Poems of Yes and No, Project Gutenberg.
- Behold This Dreamer, Project Gutenberg.
- It Takes Practice Not to Die, Project Gutenberg.
- The House of Sleep, Project Gutenberg.
- Collection guide for the Elizabeth Bartlett Collection held by Special Collections & Archives, University of California, San Diego. This collection contains literary and publishing correspondence; personal records and notes; newspaper clippings; program and exhibit announcements; book reviews; original manuscripts; a complete collection of Bartlett's published books, short stories, essays, and reviews; a collection of her poetry publications in literary reviews, journals, and newspapers; anthologies in which her work was published; and tape recordings of her poetry readings. Also included in the collection are copies of a wide variety of previously unpublished manuscripts (books, short stories, plays, scripts, and essays), including Bartlett's long 550-page typescript of her autobiographical novel, Portrait of Time: Sea Drift, Literary Olympics materials (published Literary Olympics anthologies, literary, publishing, and legal correspondence, manuscripts, photographs, and related source material), and original poetry-related original art by Bartlett.
- Elizabeth Bartlett Collection held by Archives and Special Collections, University of Louisville. This collection contains autographed copies of published books by Bartlett, copies of Literary Olympics volumes edited by Bartlett, selected literary quarterlies in which Bartlett's work was published, issues of ETC: A Review of General Semantics for which Bartlett served as Poetry Editor, and a complete recording of Bartlett's reading of Hermann Hesse's Nobel Prize winning novel, Magister Ludi.
- Works by Elizabeth Bartlett in the Library of Congress.
- Works by Elizabeth Bartlett in University of California libraries.
- Works by or about Elizabeth Bartlett in libraries catalogued by WorldCat.
- Camille, Pamela; "An Interview with Elizabeth Bartlett," Crosscurrents, Vol. 2, No. 2, 1982, pp. 50–59.
- Biographical sketch of Elizabeth Bartlett: Bartlett, Steven; "Elizabeth Bartlett: A Portrait in Words," in Dasha Čulić Nisula (Ed.), Leading Contemporary Poets: An International Anthology, pp. 341–346. Kalamazoo, MI: Poetry International, 1997.
