= Steven James Bartlett =

American philosopher and psychologist

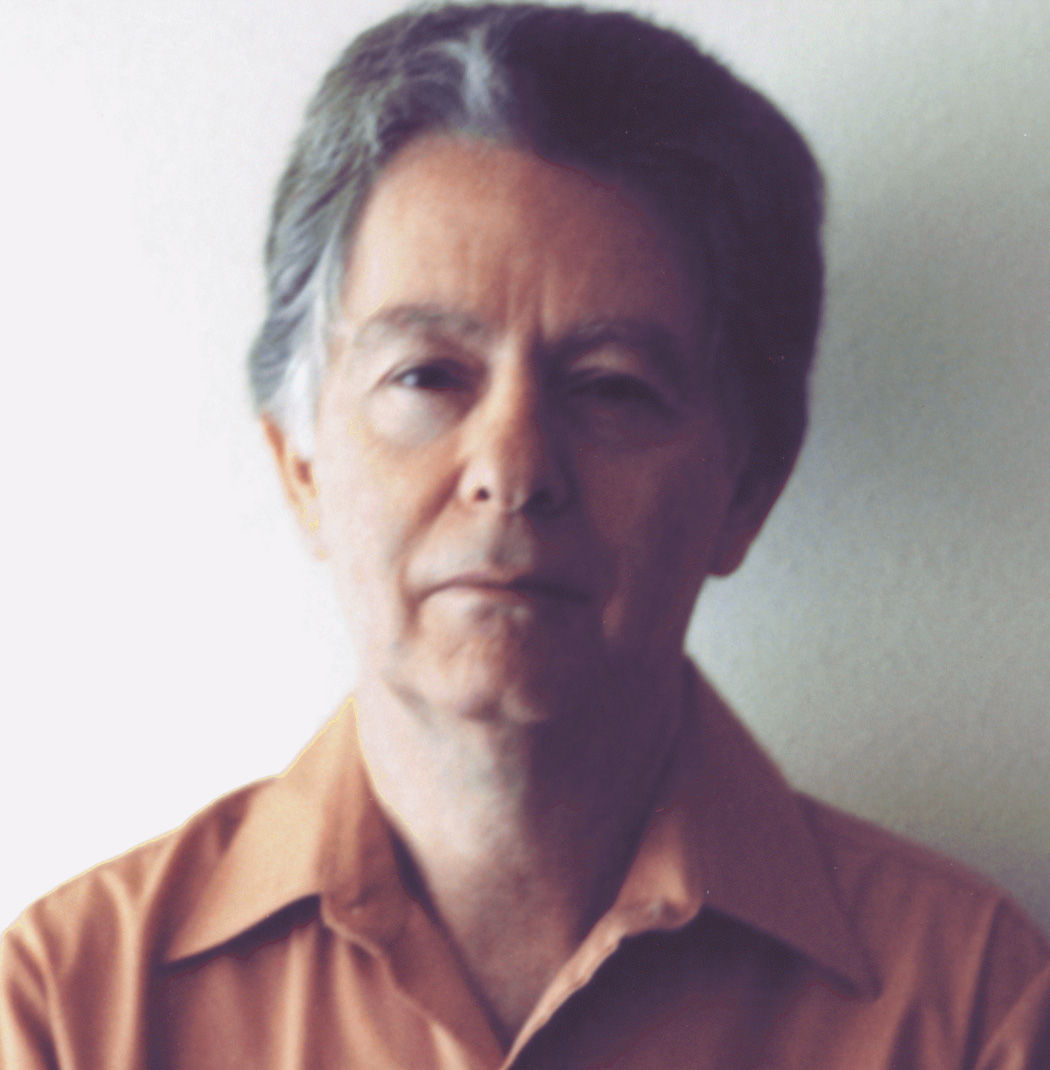
- Steven James Bartlett 2005, age 60
- Born: 1945 (age 80–81); Mexico City, Mexico
- Education: University of the Pacific (BA); University of California, Santa Barbara (MA); University of Paris (PhD)
- Known for: • Pathologies of normality • Rejection of DSM's concept of mental disorders • Conceptual therapy • Metalogic of reference
- Scientific career
- Fields: Epistemology; Psychology; Logic; Philosophy of science
- Workplaces: • Willamette University (1988- ) • Oregon State University (1988- ) • Saint Louis University (1975-1984) • Max-Planck-Institut (1974-75) • University of Hartford (1972-74) • University of Florida (1971-72) • Center for the Study of Democratic Institutions (1969-70)
- Thesis: A Relativistic Theory of Phenomenological Constitution: A Self-referential, Transcendental Approach to Conceptual Pathology (1970)
- Doctoral advisor: Paul Ricoeur
- Website: http://www.willamette.edu/~sbartlet

Steven James Bartlett (born 1945) is an American philosopher and psychologist notable for his studies in epistemology and the theory of reflexivity, and for his work on the psychology of human aggression and destructiveness, and the shortcomings of psychological normality. His findings challenge the assumption that psychological normality should serve as a standard for good mental health. He is the author or editor of more than 20 books and research monographs as well as many papers published in professional journals in the fields of epistemology, psychology, mathematical logic, and philosophy of science.

== Biography ==
Bartlett was born in Mexico City. He is the son of American author and artist Paul Alexander Bartlett and his wife, American poet Elizabeth Bartlett. Steven James Bartlett received his B.A. in 1965 from Raymond College, an Oxford-style honors college of the University of the Pacific, his M.A. in philosophy in 1968 from the University of California, Santa Barbara, his Ph.D. in philosophy in 1971 from the Université de Paris, and later engaged in postdoctoral study in clinical psychology at Saint Louis University, 1975–77, and Washington University in St. Louis, 1983–84.

Prior to high school, Bartlett attended schools both in the United States and in Mexico while his father undertook a study of some 350 haciendas throughout Mexico. Bartlett showed unusual aptitude, skipping a grade in grammar school, attending college concomitantly while still in high school, and completing his undergraduate degree in three years, followed by a succession of scholarships and fellowships during undergraduate and graduate study.

Bartlett served as professor at the University of Florida, 1971–72, and at the University of Hartford, 1972–74; was appointed research fellow at the Max-Planck-Institut zur Erforschung der Lebensbedingungen der wissenschaftlich-technischen Welt in Starnberg, Germany, 1974–75; served as consultant for the RAND-National Science Foundation Project in Regional Analysis and Management of Environmental Systems, 1975–78; served as professor at Saint Louis University, 1975–84; was Associate Editor of The Modern Schoolman, 1975–84, Member of the advisory board of the Dutch journal Methodology and Science, 1976–95, Member of the Global Advisory Board of Human Dignity and Humiliation Studies, 2005- ; and has received honorary faculty appointments at Willamette University, 1988- , and at Oregon State University, 1988- . Bartlett is Trustee and Director of Publications for the international non-profit organization, Literary Olympics, Inc., 1994- .

He is married to Karen Margo Bartlett (Germanist, cellist, and viola da gambist), daughter of Shirley Love and physicist Allan W. Love, designer of the antenna line feed for the Arecibo Observatory's radio telescope.

== Recognition and importance ==
Bartlett has received recognition in both disciplines of philosophy and psychology. He is the author or editor of more than 20 books and research monographs, and many papers published in professional journals. His research has been funded under grants by the National Science Foundation, the Max-Planck-Gesellschaft, the Alliance Française, the Center for the Study of Democratic Institutions, the American Association for the Advancement of Science, the Lilly Endowment, and others. His work in both disciplines has been supported by well-known authors and researchers including Paul Ricoeur, Robert Hutchins, Carl Friedrich von Weizsäcker, Thomas Szasz, M. Scott Peck, Irving Greenberg, and others. Bartlett's work has been translated into German, Portuguese, French, and Polish.

== Principal areas of research ==
As described in further detail in the sections that follow, Bartlett's research and publications can be divided into two main groups: studies in philosophy and studies in clinical psychology. In philosophy, his research has focused on the theory of reflexivity, self-referential argumentation, and the metatheory of reference and identification. In clinical psychology, his research has focused on human pathology as it is expressed in genocide, the Holocaust, war, terrorism, obedience, hatred, human ecological destruction, and human conceptual pathology. In addition, Bartlett's research in clinical psychology has sought to develop our understanding of what he calls human moral intelligence, as well as of the psychology of peer review and editorial bias, the phenomenology of hatred, the psychology of mediocrity, and the psychology of stupidity. He has challenged the conventional understanding and treatment of mental disorders as promoted by the Diagnostic and Statistical Manual of Mental Disorders. Bartlett's publishing record and biographical information show that his work developed during the following approximate periods:

- 1964–1974, studies in phenomenology
- 1975–1988, studies relating to the metalogic of reference
- 1989–2011, studies relating to clinical psychology
- 2012- , further work relating to the metalogic of reference

=== Research and publications in philosophy ===
==== Phenomenology and the elimination of conceptual error ====
Beginning with Bartlett's doctoral dissertation, whose doctoral jury members were French philosopher Paul Ricoeur (dissertation director), Belgian mathematical logician Jean Ladrière, and Belgian philosopher Alphonse de Waehlens, Bartlett developed an approach to the study of philosophical problems by means of a therapy for concepts. The approach took the form of a self-validating phenomenological epistemology whose purpose is the identification and correction of many conceptually self-undermining errors that Bartlett classified as conceptual pathologies. He applied the resulting methodology to a number of traditionally understood epistemological problems, as well as to portions of everyday, conventional conceptual vocabulary, to show that many of these must be recognized to be self-referentially inconsistent. He characterized the resulting methodology as self-validating in the sense that it cannot not be accepted without self-referential inconsistency.

==== Studies of the metalogic of reference and conceptual therapy ====
Bartlett first formulated his revisionary methodology within a phenomenological framework in which the concept of reference plays a logically primitive role; he later separated his approach to conceptual therapy from phenomenology. This took the form of a theoretically neutral metalogic of reference.

In 2021, Bartlett's most extensive and complex work in philosophy was published, Critique of Impure Reason: Horizons of Possibility and Meaning. This massive study of nearly 900 pages develops and extends his earlier work relating to conceptual therapy and the metalogic of reference. Its principal objective is to formulate a logically compelling method that makes it possible to recognize the unavoidable boundaries—Bartlett calls these the "horizons"—of our conceptual frameworks so we may avoid the conceptual confusions that result when attempts are made to transgress beyond what is possible and meaningful. The Critique of Impure Reason then applies the method to a wide group of conceptually basic concepts (for example, space, time, causality, consciousness, the self, other minds, etc.) that play a central role in major philosophical questions and problems, and many of which are also relied upon in ordinary thinking and are used in the formulation of many scientific theories

==== Studies of reflexivity ====
Bartlett has contributed to the field of study the general theory of reflexivity, which investigates the properties of systems capable of self-reference. As Bartlett has described, there are many such systems, ranging from reflexive formal systems in mathematics and in mathematical logic, to self-referential systems in artificial intelligence and the theory of computation, to self-referential systems that are physiologically based — an advanced example being that of human self-awareness and the capacity to reflect on that awareness. Secondary applications arise in connection with breakdowns in reflexive functioning found in certain psychopathologies.

=== Research and publications in clinical psychology ===
Bartlett's studies relating to clinical psychology have focused on the following areas:

==== The psychology of human aggression and destructiveness ====
In 2005, Bartlett's book The Pathology of Man: A Study of Human Evil was published. The 200,000-word study applies the science of pathology to the human species in order to identify and describe many dispositionally-based pathologies that afflict our species, often without our awareness. A central purpose of the book is to bring together and discuss the work of twentieth century psychologists, psychiatrists, ethologists, psychologically focused historians, and others who have studied the underlying psychology of human aggression and destructiveness. The conclusions of the study emphasize that human pathology has many originating factors, that people obtain varied cognitive and emotional gratifications from such pathology, and that human pathology is a normal human condition and is therefore generally intractable, at least at this stage of human development. Bartlett describes how deficits in what he defines as moral intelligence combine with the psychology of stupidity, which together form major contributors to the psychological shortcomings that result in human pathology. In critical responses to the book, the study was commended by The Journal of Analytical Psychology: "Bartlett is a lucid, painstaking and illuminating writer. This is certainly a classic work of reference in the field." The Bulletin of the Menninger Clinic appraised the book as "a challenging and thought provoking approach that makes a significant contribution to an aspect of human psychopathology that is rarely or so comprehensively addressed." About the book, M. Scott Peck commented: "[T]he study of evil is just beginning and you are a pioneer." Eric Zillmer, Carl R. Pacifico Professor of Neuropsychology at Drexel University, commended the book: "Steven James Bartlett's The Pathology of Man marks the most comprehensive examination of evil to date. Drawing from different fields of study, including psychology and epistemology, Bartlett sets out on a Tour de Force of delineating the parameters on human evil.... The resulting text is a most welcome addition to the field and provides for fascinating reading. The Pathology of Man is a timely, scholarly, and important piece of work that should appeal to anyone who is interested in understanding human evil." Author and President of the Jewish Life Network Irving Greenberg commented: "This book is stunning, upsetting, gripping.... [T]he book is a moral act of the highest order. These...comments would be incomplete without mentioning the erudition, the intellectual insight and playfulness, the gallows humor and the self-restraint which deepen and lighten this book." Since the publication of The Pathology of Man, Bartlett has published a series of further books and papers related to the same and related subjects.

==== Challenging the standard of psychological normality presupposed by contemporary psychiatry and much clinical psychology ====
In 2011, Bartlett's book Normality Does Not Equal Mental Health: The Need to Look Elsewhere for Standards of Good Psychological Health was published. The book examines contemporary psychiatry's and clinical psychology's definition of mental health in terms of the baseline standard of psychological normality. Bartlett makes the case that this supposition has come to be accepted uncritically — even though that supposition is fundamental to current clinical theory and practice, and forms the core of the psychiatric classification system of the DSM (the Diagnostic and Statistical Manual of Mental Disorders), which has become today's diagnostic authority. Normality Does Not Equal Mental Health questions and rejects this central assumption. Among the author's objections to this assumption is the reification by the DSM of syndromes (i.e., equating mere syndromes with real disease entities) despite the absence of an organic basis for the majority of alleged medical disorders. Bartlett seeks to offer a constructive revision of what we should accept as a standard for good mental health. A critical assessment by PsychCRITIQUES combined a review of both The Pathology of Man and Normality Does Not Equal Mental Health, evaluating the two books as follows: "Pathology and Normality contain many altogether usefully reframed concepts. [T]he semiotic analysis of nosologies offered in Chapter 2 of Normality [is] a most promising organizing conceptual framework, helpful in understanding the problems with DSM classifications. It could not be more relevant in our times.... I wish everyone would read Bartlett's chapter in Normality on the abuses of peer review and editorial bias (Chapter 7) and adopt his proposed code of conduct for peer reviewers and editors (p. 172). And Bartlett's treatment of relativism, the relativity of frameworks, and human evil in Pathology is absolutely limpid (Chapter 20). These and many other gems are scattered throughout the books. For this reason, and because the books present such an unusual stance that can provoke thoughtful consideration of the accepted truths in psychology, I highly recommend them.... Both books are well written and clearly structured. Bartlett follows a regular expository pattern by explaining objectives, logically and systematically developing arguments and conclusions, and presenting frequent summaries. The premises and implications are intellectually easy to grasp, unforgettable, and alarming.... Bartlett includes considerations and concepts that are seldom presented elsewhere."

==== Psychotherapy and its effectiveness ====
Over a period of decades, Bartlett has weighed the question whether psychotherapy is truly effective. In 1987, his book When You Don't Know Where to Turn: A Self-Diagnosing Guide to Counseling and Therapy was published and subsequently adopted by the Psychology Today Book Club and the Psychotherapy Book Club. The book presents a self-diagnosing algorithm to help readers identify, based on effectiveness studies, potentially most promising forms of therapeutic care. The algorithm takes into account individual symptoms, circumstances, personality, and life goals. The book was followed by the publication of the author's summary appraisal of the effectiveness of psychotherapy, about which psychiatrist Thomas Szasz, a long-time critic of psychiatry, commented: "It is one of the best, if not the best, that I have read on this subject." Similarly, psychologist Hans H. Strupp, who has extensively studied the effectiveness of psychotherapy, commented: "I find myself in substantial agreement with [Bartlett's] major points which are well stated."

==== The psychology of higher education and burn-out among liberal arts faculty ====
Bartlett studied these issues in a series of published papers that seek to explain faculty demoralization that can result from deteriorating conditions affecting the state of higher education in America.

==== The psychology of animal rights ====
Bartlett published a psychological and epistemological analysis of the blocks that prevent the majority of people from recognizing and respecting the sentience of members of other species. The study, "Roots of Human Resistance to Animal Rights: Psychological and Conceptual Blocks," was developed within a legal framework in order to make evident the ways in which human laws have reflected the underlying psychological and conceptual blocks to compassionate treatment of non-human animals. Bartlett was later invited by Brazil's Ministry of Education to address the International Congress on Animal Rights, Salvador, Brazil, Oct. 8–11, 2008. For use at the Congress, "Roots of Human Resistance to Animal Rights" was translated into Portuguese and then published.

==== The psychology of creativity ====
Bartlett's studies relating to the nosology of mental illness and his critique of the assumption that psychological normality should be equated with good mental health led him to examine the psychology of creative individuals. The psychology of artists and other highly creative people has been studied from the diagnostic perspective of DSM's psychiatric classification of mental disorders, with the result that some outstanding creative individuals may be considered to have various degrees of psychopathology. Bartlett has argued that this is not only short-sighted, but it questionably presumes that the psychology of normality should serve as arbiter for mentally healthy emotional, aesthetic, and cognitive characteristics and abilities. In a group of further publications, Bartlett has described in detail how it is possible to enrich and deepen our understanding of both the psychology of creativity and the psychology of normality.

==== Psychological studies of philosophy ====
With training and research in psychology and philosophy, Bartlett has undertaken a psychological examination both of philosophy as a discipline and of philosophers as a psychologically characterizable group. Related to this work, Bartlett has sought to identify and describe "epistemological intelligence" as a distinguishable variety of human intelligence, one which he explains is especially important to philosophers. In this context, he has sought to understand the challenges posed by the psychological profile of philosophers that can obstruct the development and implementation of the skills associated with epistemological intelligence.

== External links and resources ==
=== Biographical resources ===
- "Steven James Bartlett" entry in Contemporary Authors Online. Literature Resource Center. Gale Document Number: GALE H1000305527. Detroit: Gale, 2013.
- Steven James Bartlett, "Short Bio" from Willamette University website.
- "About the Author," in Steven James Bartlett, The Pathology of Man: A Study of Human Evil. Springfield, IL: Charles C. Thomas, 2005, p. 360.
- "About the Author," in Steven James Bartlett, Normality Does Not Equal Mental Health: The Need to Look Elsewhere for Standards of Good Psychological Health. Santa Barbara, CA: Praeger Publishers, 2011, p. 309.
- "About the Author," in Bartlett, Steven James (2015). "The species problem: inescapable ambiguity and redundancy". arXiv:1510.01589 [q-bio.OT].
- Steven James Bartlett, biographical entry as Member of the Global Advisory Board of Human Dignity and Humiliation Studies.
- Steven James Bartlett, "A Brief Conceptual Autobiography" from Willamette University website.
- Directory of American Scholars. Vol. 4: Philosophy, Religion, & Law, 1974, 1978, 1982, 1999, 2002.
- Who's Who in U.S. Writers, Editors & Poets. A Biographical Directory, 1988.
- Who's Who in Writers, Editors & Poets. United States & Canada, 1989–1990, 1992–1993, 1995–1996.
- Who's Who in the 21st Century, 2002.
- 2000 Outstanding Intellectuals of the 21st Century, 2001.
- 2000 Outstanding Scholars of the 21st Century, 2000.
- 5000 Personalities of the World, 1997.
- International Authors and Writers Who's Who, 1991.

=== Selected books and papers ===
- A Relativistic Theory of Phenomenological Constitution: A Self-referential, Transcendental Approach to Conceptual Pathology. Doctoral dissertation, Université de Paris, 2 vols., 834 pages: Vol. I in French, and Vol. II in English.
- VALIDITY: A Learning Game Approach to Mathematical Logic. An academic learning game for use in university-level classes in mathematical logic, including both propositional and predicate calculi.
- "Phenomenology of the Implicit." Describes the author's transition from phenomenology to studies of the preconditions of reference.
- "Fenomenologia Tego – Co Implikowane." A Polish translation of the author's "Phenomenology of the Implicit."
- Conceptual Therapy: An Introduction to Framework-relative Epistemology. A text applying Bartlett's self-validating approach to conceptual analysis.
- Reflexivity: A Source Book in Self-Reference. An edited collection of 33 papers by authors who have contributed to this area of study, including Fitch, Smullyan, Prior, Rescher, van Fraassen, Johnstone, Boyle, Bartlett, and others.
- "The Problem of Psychotherapeutic Effectiveness." A paper describing the main determinants of the effectiveness of psychotherapy.
- "Roots of Human Resistance to Animal Rights: Psychological and Conceptual Blocks." The paper examines a variety of blocks that originate in human psychology and in common ways of thinking, blocks that obstruct our recognition of and respect for both the individual consciousness and the legal rights of non-human animals.
- "Raízes da resistência humana aos direitos dos animais: Bloqueios psicológicos e conceituais." Daniel Braga Lourenço (Portuguese trans.). A translation into Portuguese of the preceding paper.
- When You Don't Know Where to Turn: A Self-diagnosing Guide to Counseling and Therapy: eBook from Project Gutenberg. Presents an algorithm to aid people in identifying approaches to counseling or therapy likely to be most helpful to them.
- "The Idea of a Metalogic of Reference". An informal introduction to the approach central to Bartlett's epistemology.
- "Referential Consistency as a Criterion of Meaning". In this paper, Bartlett formulates what he calls a "self-validating" criterion of meaning. By this he means a necessary, but not a sufficient, condition of meaning that is logically compelling in the sense that this criterion of meaning cannot not be accepted without bringing about a form of self-referential consistency that undermines the very possibility of meaning. Bartlett argues that this "metalogical" variety of self-referential inconsistency comprises a new and distinct kind of self-referential inconsistency, to be distinguished from the philosophically familiar varieties of semantical and pragmatical self-referential inconsistency.
- "The Role of Reflexivity in Understanding Human Understanding". "Introduction" from Steven James Bartlett (Ed.), Reflexivity: A Source-Book in Self-Reference, pp. 3–18.
- The Species Problem: Inescapable Ambiguity and Redundancy. Open access monograph available from ArXiv.org, CogPrints, HAL (Centre pour la Communication Scientifique Directe), and PhilSci. In Bartlett's monograph, the "species problem" refers to past efforts, foremost by biologists, to define definitively and objectively what the concept of "species" means. Bartlett seeks to demonstrate two central assertions about the species problem: First, he claims that past efforts to define in any compelling way what "species" means have been unsuccessful because they have failed to understand the theoretical impossibility of the task. It is theoretically impossible, he argues, to define in any compelling way what "species" means due to what he calls "the inescapable ambiguity" that is ingredient in the very attempt to reach such a definition. Second, he claims that the solution to the species problem requires what he calls a "framework-relative" approach to species definition. Such an approach, Bartlett seeks to demonstrate, is logically compelling in the sense that it cannot not be accepted without inconsistency.
- "The Case for Government by Artificial Intelligence". A critical and speculative essay, briefly reviewing Bartlett's previous book-length studies relating to shortcomings of psychological normality, and discussing their possible remediation through government by artificial intelligence.
- "Paratheism: A Proof That God Neither Exists nor Does Not Exist". Bartlett argues that theism, atheism, and agnosticism are all fundamentally incoherent from the standpoint of a logical, epistemological analysis. He formulates a proof that theism, as well as atheism and agnosticism, are equally unacceptable because each is "conceptually self-undermining" and therefore incoherent.
- Epistemological Intelligence. Open access monograph available from HAL (Centre pour la Communication Scientifique Directe) and PhilPapers. In this monograph, Bartlett develops the concept of "epistemological intelligence," which he introduces as a new distinguishable variety of human intelligence. He reports his observations of the psychology of philosophers, and claims that the commonly prevailing psychological profile of philosophers often stands in the way of their ability to develop the skills that define epistemological intelligence.
- "Mismeasuring Our Lives: The Case against Usefulness, Popularity, and the Desire to Influence Others". In this paper, Bartlett examines what he claims are three important and unquestioned presumptions that fundamentally influence contemporary society, our educational system, and the professions. These presumptions are: the high value that is placed on usefulness, on striving for popularity, and on the wish to influence other people. He presents the case against these presumptions which he claims impede the development of human culture.
- "The Objectivity of Truth, Morality, and Beauty". In this essay, Bartlett advances an innovative approach to answer the perennial question whether truth, morality, and beauty have an objective basis. The essay seeks to show how it is possible to associate three varieties of human intelligence—cognitive intelligence, "moral intelligence," and "aesthetic intelligence"—with justifiable objective judgments about truth, morality, and beauty.
- "America's Upside-down Doctrine of Education: Albert Jay Nock's Theory of What Has Gone Wrong — Or Is It Right?". In this paper, Bartlett examines a set of fundamental assumptions about American education that were analyzed and criticized almost a hundred years ago by Albert Jay Nock, an author and theorist of education. Nock's theory of American education points to a need to question these assumptions and, if possible, to support them with evidence.

=== Additional online resources ===
- A variety of books and papers by Steven James Bartlett; some are abstracted and some are archived by PhilPapers.
- Official website (at Willamette University) A selection of Bartlett's downloadable books, papers, and related commentary and discussion.
- Works by Steven James Bartlett at Project Gutenberg

=== Library cataloguing information ===
- Works by Steven James Bartlett in the Library of Congress; works listed under the alternative name Steven J. Bartlett in the Library of Congress; works listed under the alternative name Steven Bartlett in the Library of Congress.
- Works by Steven James Bartlett in libraries catalogued by WorldCat; works listed under the alternative name Steven J. Bartlett in libraries catalogued by WorldCat.
- Works by Steven James Bartlett catalogued by the University of California libraries; works listed under the alternative name Steven J. Bartlett catalogued by the University of California libraries.
