= Grace Flandrau =

American writer

- Grace Flandrau
- Born: April 23, 1886 St. Paul, Minnesota, United States
- Died: December 27, 1971 (aged 85) Farmington, Connecticut, United States
- Occupation: Writer

Grace Hodgson Flandrau (April 23, 1886 – December 27, 1971) was an American author of novels, short stories and journalistic pieces. Although she achieved a certain degree of critical acclaim for several of her novels, short stories and some of her journalism career during the 1920s, 1930s and 1940s, she faded from public literary view in the later part of her life. Flaudrau's reputation is re-emerging as a prominent writer due to a 2007 biography, which has been promoted by, among others, Garrison Keillor.

== Biography ==
Grace Corrin Hodgson was born in St. Paul, Minnesota, the illegitimate daughter of Edward John Hodgson and Anna Redding Hodson. She was raised by Hodgson and his wife, Mary Staples Hodgson.

Following her marriage to William Blair Flandrau in 1909, she embarked on a career as a writer. She wrote six books, three of which were turned into motion pictures, and more than four dozen short stories. During her lifetime, she was one of Minnesota's best-known authors, with her own radio show and a weekly column in the St. Paul Dispatch.

Flandrau was well respected throughout her writing years, the 1920s, 1930s and 1940s. F. Scott Fitzgerald, a fellow Saint Paul writer, said that her novel Being Respectable was "better than Babbitt" and confided in a personal letter that Edith Wharton liked that book "better than any American novel in years." Flandrau's work was included in The Best Short Story collections for 1932, 1933 and 1943.

Her next novel, Entranced, was not as successful as Being Respectable, and thereafter Flandrau began to focus on journalism. She turned out several pamphlets on early Minnesota history for the Great Northern Railway, which was then based in St. Paul, and a trip to Africa in 1927 provided fruitful material for a travel book, Then I Saw the Congo, as well as a collection of stories, Under the Sun. As a travel writer, Flandrau was ahead of her time, exploring her exotic locale from an objective, humanistic standpoint, and challenging the notion that Europeans were the superior race. Of Flandrau's six books, only Cousin Julia and Being Respectable are still in print.

Flandrau continued writing into the mid-1940s, but an increasing sense of despair and depression overcame her and she published little after 1949.

Many of her short stories were published in such magazines as Scribner's Magazine, The New Yorker, The Saturday Evening Post and Harper's Magazine, among others.

Flandrau was the sister-in-law and close friend of architect Theodate Pope Riddle, who provided her with a life tenancy in a house on the Hill-Stead estate in Farmington, Connecticut.

Flandrau died there on December 27, 1971. By the time her will was probated in 1973, her estate was valued at $10,000,000. In her will, she left a major bequest to establish, in honor of her brother-in-law, another noted author, the Charles Macomb Flandrau Fund at Harvard University, aimed to encourage good writing. Her gift to the University of Arizona led to the construction of the Flandrau Science Center and Planetarium in Tucson, Arizona, opening in 1975.

== Books ==
- Cousin Julia (1917)
- Being Respectable (1923)
- Entranced (1924)
- Then I Saw the Congo (1929)
- Indeed This Flesh (1934)
- Under the Sun. Tales of Love and Death (1936)
